= Quodlibeta =

Medieval form of public disputation, originating at the University of Paris

During the Middle Ages, quodlibeta were public disputations in which scholars debated questions "about anything" (de quolibet) posed by the audience. The practice originated in the theological faculty of the University of Paris around 1230. Classes were suspended just before Christmas and Easter holidays so that the masters could hold public sessions taking questions from the audience. After 1270, the practice spread beyond Paris, but elsewhere was usually associated with the studia (schools) of the mendicant orders. The first to introduce the quodlibeta to an institution outside of Paris was John of Peckham at Oxford University in 1272–1275. Records of quodlibeta survive on parchment from the 1230s to the 1330s, but thereafter written records are scarce. The practice, however, continued into the sixteenth century.

A catalogue of quodlibetal questions and manuscripts was published by Palémon Glorieux in two volumes between 1925 and 1932. Glorieux catalogued about 325 recorded quodlibeta by about 120 named authors and 30 anonymous quodlibeta. This amounts to over 6,000 individual questions. About half of quodlibeta and a definite majority of questions and manuscripts are attributed to Dominican or Franciscan scholars.

Some Dominicans produced responses to written quodlibeta, imitating the form in what Russell Friedman calls "anti-quodlibeta", usually in defence of Thomas Aquinas. These writers include Robert of Orford, Thomas of Sutton, Bernard of Auvergne and Hervaeus Natalis.

== Authors of quodlibeta ==
The following list is from Glorieux, except as noted.

- Albert of Cluny
- Adenulf of Anagni
- Adrian Florensz Dedal
- Alain Gontier
- Alexander Achillini
- Alexander of Alessandria
- Alexander of Hales
- Alexander of Sant'Elpidio
- Amadeus de Castello
- Andrew of Mont-Saint-Éloi
- Annibaldo Annibaldi
- Antonio da Rho
- Arnold of Liège
- Aufredo Gonteri Brito
- Augustine of Ancona
- Bernard Lombardi
- Bernard of Trilia
- Berthaud of Saint-Denis
- Bertrand de la Tour
- Durand of Saint-Pourçain
- Eudes of Châteauroux
- Eustace of Arras
- Eustace of Grandcourt
- Ferrarius Catalanus
- Francesco Caracciolo
- Francis of Marchia
- Francis of Meyronnes
- Geoffrey Hardeby
- Gerard of Abbeville
- Gerard of Bologna
- Gerard Odonis
- Gerard of Saint-Victor
- Gerard of Siena
- Giles of Rome
- Godfrey of Fontaines
- Gonsalvus of Spain
- Gonterus
- Gregory of Lucca
- Guerric of Saint-Quentin
- Guido Terrena
- Guy de l'Aumône
- Guy of Cluny
- Henry Amandi
- Henry the German
- Henry of Ghent
- Henry of Harclay
- Henry of Lübeck
- Hermannus de Augusta
- Hervaeus Natalis
- Ivo of Caen
- Jacques Fournier
- Jacques de Quesnoy
- James of Aaleus
- James of Ascoli
- James of Pamiers
- James of Thérines
- James of Viterbo
- Jan Hus
- Johannes Briard of Ath
- Johannes Dorstein
- Johannes Varenacker
- John Baconthorpe
- John of Châtillon
- John Duns Scotus
- John Grafton
- John of Lana
- John Lesage
- John of Maroeuil
- John of Murro
- John of Naples
- John of Peckham
- John of Pouilly
- John Quidort
- John of Reading
- John of Rodington
- John du Val
- John of Tongres
- John of Waarde
- Kykeley
- Laurence of Dreux
- Laurence of Nantes
- Laurence of Poulangy
- Martin of Abbeville
- Matthew of Aquasparta
- Nicholas of Bar
- Nicholas of Lyra
- Nicholas du Pressoir
- Nicholas Trivet
- Nicholas of Vaux-Cernay
- Oliver of Tréguier
- Peter of Atarrabia
- Peter Auriol
- Peter of Auvergne
- Peter of England
- Peter of Falco
- Peter John Olivi
- Peter of Palude
- Peter de Rivo
- Peter Roger
- Peter of Saint-Denis
- Peter of Saint-Omer
- Peter Sutton
- Peter Swanington
- Peter of Tarentaise
- Peter Thomas
- Peter of Trabibus
- Prosper of Reggio Emilia
- Radulphus Brito
- Rainier Marquette of Clairmarais
- Ranulph of Homblières
- Raymond Bequini
- Raymond Guilha
- Raymond Rigaud
- Remigio dei Girolami
- Richard Knapwell
- Richard of Menneville
- Robert Holcot
- Robert Walsingham
- Robert Winchelsey
- Roger Marston
- Servais of Guez
- Sibert of Beek
- Simon of Corbie
- Simon of Guiberville
- Simon of Lens
- Thomas Aquinas
- Thomas de Bailly
- Thomas Claxton
- Thomas of Sutton
- Thomas Wylton
- Vital du Four
- Walter Burley
- Walter Chatton
- William of Alnwick
- William of Barlo
- William Crathorn
- William of Cremona
- William Hothum
- William de la Mare
- William of Ockham
- William of Rubio
- William Woodford

== Bibliography ==
=== English editions ===
- Guerric of Saint-Quentin (2002). Principe, Walter H.; Black, Jonathan (eds.). Quaestiones de quolibet. Brepols.
- Henry of Ghent (1993). Teske, Roland J. (ed.). Quodlibetal Questions on Free Will. Marquette University Press.
- Henry of Ghent (2005). Teske, Roland J. (ed.). Quodlibetal Questions on Moral Problems. Marquette University Press.
- John Duns Scotus (1975). Alluntis, Felix; Wolter, Allan B. (eds.). God and Creatures: The Quodlibetal Questions. Princeton University Press.
- Thomas Aquinas (2019). Davies, Brian; Nevitt, Turner (eds.). Thomas Aquinas's Quodlibetal Questions. Oxford University Press.

=== Secondary literature ===
- Courtenay, William J. (2007). "Postscript: The Demise of Quodlibetal Literature". In Schabel, Christopher (ed.). Theological Quodlibeta in the Middle Ages: The Fourteenth Century. Brill. pp. 693–699.
- Friedman, Russell L. (2007). "Dominican Quodlibetal Literature, ca. 1260–1330". In Schabel, Christopher (ed.). Theological Quodlibeta in the Middle Ages: The Fourteenth Century. Brill. pp. 401–491.
- Glorieux, Palémon (1925–1935). La littérature quodlibétique de 1260 à 1320. Le Saulchoir.
- Rutherford, David; Schulten, Paul, eds. (2023). Antonio da Rho, Three Dialogues against Lactantius (Dialogi tres in Lactentium): Critical Latin Edition, English Translation, Introduction, and Notes. Brill.
- Piron, Sylvain (2006). "Franciscan Quodlibeta in Southern Studia and at Paris, 1280–1300". In Schabel, Christopher (ed.). Theological Quodlibeta in the Middle Ages: The Thirteenth Century. Brill. pp. 403–438.
- Schabel, Christopher, ed. (2006). Theological Quodlibeta in the Middle Ages: The Thirteenth Century. Brill.
- Schabel, Christopher, ed. (2007). Theological Quodlibeta in the Middle Ages: The Fourteenth Century. Brill.
- Sullivan, Thomas (2007). "The Quodlibeta of the Canons Regular and the Monks". In Schabel, Christopher (ed.). Theological Quodlibeta in the Middle Ages: The Fourteenth Century. Brill. pp. 359–400.
- Sweeney, Eileen (2023). "Literary Forms of Medieval Philosophy". Stanford Encyclopedia of Philosophy. Stanford University.
