= Robert of Orford (Dominican) =

Robert of Orford (fl. 1293), also called Robert of Oxford, Robert of Colletorto or Robert of Torto Collo, was an English Dominican master of theology at the University of Oxford and an early defender of Thomas Aquinas.

== Life ==
Robert studied at either Oxford or Cambridge, and is said to have been a bachelor of divinity. He may have afterwards gone to the University of Paris before returning to Oxford, but this conjectural. The date at which he became a master is unknown. He was the respondens in a disputation with a certain Richard Clive (known from a Cambridge manuscript) and another with Alan of Wakerfield, the Franciscan master of theology at Oxford, around 1285. He preached a sermon at Oxford on 22 February 1293.

Robert's name is incorrectly given as William in one manuscript. Leandro Alberti placed his activity as early 1242, but all other evidence puts it much later.

== Works ==
Robert's writings include:

- Correctorium corruptorii sciendum, a defence of Thomism against the criticism of William de la Mare's Correctivum fratris Thomae
- Contra dicta Magistri Henrici de Gandavo, a critical response to Henry of Ghent
- Reprobationes dictorum a fratre Egidio in primum Sententiarum, a treatise against Giles of Rome, anonymous in its sole manuscript witness

The Contra dicta Henrici was written between 1289 and 1293. It is a response to Henry's quodlibeta 1–14, the last of which was only disputed in 1290 or 1291. Robert's response was circulating before Henry's death in 1293, since it was used by Remigio dei Girolami while Henry was still living.

There is general consensus that Robert's surviving writings seem to have been written in a hurry, resulting at times in superficiality.

The Contra dicta Henrici and Reprobationes dictorum are listed under Robert of Orford's name in the 14th-century Stams Catalogue of Dominican authors. The 16th-century bibliographer John Pits records that he also wrote against James of Viterbo. The treatise De natura materiae, formerly attributed to Aquinas, may be by Robert.

== Bibliography ==
- Friedman, Russell L. (2007). "Dominican Quodlibetal Literature, ca. 1260–1330". In Schabel, Christopher (ed.). Theological Quodlibeta in the Middle Ages: The Fourteenth Century. Brill. pp. 420–491.
- Gaine, Simon Francis (2006). "Orford, Robert [Robert of Oxford]". Oxford Dictionary of National Biography (online ed.). Oxford University Press. doi:10.1093/ref:odnb/20827. (Subscription, Wikipedia Library access or UK public library membership required.)
- Kelley, Francis E. (1983). "The Egidean Influence in Robert Orford's Doctrine on Form". The Thomist: A Speculative Quarterly Review. 47 (1): 77–99. doi:10.1353/tho.1983.0051.
