= John of Naples (14th century) =

Italian Dominican fiar and philosopher

John of Naples (Italian: Giovanni di Napoli, Latin: Johannes de Neapoli), also known as Giovanni Regina, was a Dominican friar and prominent Thomist theologian and philosopher in the early 14th century.

== Life ==
John was born at Naples in the second half of the 13th century. Nothing is known of his family background. He studied theology at the Dominican seminary in Bologna. From 1309, he studied at the University of Paris. He received a master's degree in theology in 1315. He taught at Paris from 1315 until 1317. In 1317, he moved to the Dominican school of San Domenico Maggiore in Naples, where he became a professor in 1319.

John advocated for the canonization of Thomas Aquinas. On 1 August 1319, he testified in Aquinas's first canonization process in Avignon. In 1322, he replaced Guglielmo da Tocco as procurator of the second process. He was among the theologians consulted by Pope John XXII in 1322 during the formulation of the bull Cum inter nonnullos (1323), which condemned the Franciscan doctrine of the absolute poverty of Christ. His writings demonstrate that his position was very close to John XXII's.

John attended the Dominican general chapter in Bordeaux in June 1324. By 1325, he was back in Naples. He served as the executor of the testaments of Bartholomew of Capua (1328), Bernard of Lautrec (1335) and Riccardo Scillato (1341). He was also assigned administrative tasks by King Robert and Queen Joan I. In 1343, Joan made him a chaplain and familiaris of the royal household. In 1348, he accompanied her to Avignon, where she swore fealty to the pope and received a dispensation to marry Louis of Taranto. He returned to Naples that same year and died probably around 1350.

== Writings ==
John wrote at least three works: a lost commentary on Peter Lombard's Sentences (which can be dated to between 1311 and 1337), a Quaestiones disputatae and a Quaestiones de quodlibet. He had a deep interest in metaphysics, especially the problem of permanence and becoming and the distinction between essence and existence. He was also involved in debates concerning the temporal power of the Holy See, especially vis-à-vis the Holy Roman Emperor.

When the Dominican general chapter held in Marseille in 1316 asked that the errors of Durand of Saint-Pourçain be rectified, John collaborated with Peter of La Palu in drawing up a list of 235 deviations from Thomas Aquinas found in Durand's writings.

In philosophy, John belongs to the speculative tradition of Godfrey of Fontaines and James of Metz. On the principle of individuation, he held that things are individuated merely by existing: "individuation adds nothing positive over and above the reality and entity of the thing".

== Bibliography ==
- Gilson, Étienne (1955). A History of Christian Philosophy in the Middle Ages. Random House.
- Rivera Magos, Victor (2016). "Regina, Giovanni". Dizionario Biografico degli Italiani (in Italian). Vol. 86: Querenghi–Rensi. Rome: Institute of the Italian Encyclopaedia. ISBN 978-88-12-00032-6.
- Viola, Coloman (2005) [2002]. "John of Naples". In André Vauchez (ed.). Encyclopedia of the Middle Ages. James Clarke & Co. ISBN 978-0-227-67931-9.
