= Francesco Caracciolo (theologian) =

Neapolitan nobleman, diplomat and theologian

Francesco (or Francis) Caracciolo (died 31 May 1316) was a Neapolitan nobleman, diplomat and theologian who was the chancellor of Notre-Dame and of the University of Paris from 1309 or 1310 until his death.

== Life ==
Caracciolo was born in the latter half of the 13th century, probably in Naples. His father, Ligorio, count of Pisciotta, belonged to a cadet branch of the Caracciolo family. After completing his studies at the University of Naples, he became a counsellor of King Charles II of Naples (r. 1285–1309). He was sent by Queen Mary as her ambassador to the Roman curia, but he soon abandoned a secular career for theology. Caracciolo obtained a Master of Arts degree before 1300, either at Naples or at the University of Paris. By 1307, he was studying theology at Paris and held a prebend at Rouen.

Through the intervention of Duke Robert of Calabria, the future King Robert the Wise, Caracciolo obtained half of a priestly prebend attached to Notre-Dame. In August 1308, Pope Clement V granted him a future full non-priestly prebend in Paris in lieu of his half-prebend. He acquired a further prebend at Beauvais. All of these prebends were a result of his rank and connections. They facilitated his theological studies and gave him a secure income for the rest of his life.

In 1309, he wrote to King Robert asking that his old teacher, Peter of Narnia, be permitted to come to Paris to teach. He lectured on the Sentences in the period 1309–1311, but was still only a Bachelor of Theology when he was named chancellor. This took place in 1309 or 1310, for he was certainly chancellor for the academic year 1310–1311. He finally incepted as a Doctor of Theology in 1311 or 1312.

Caracciolo was the first foreign chancellor of the university and of Notre-Dame. He served as chancellor while continuing to teach. On 9 September 1311, in his first recorded act as chancellor, he approved the works of Ramon Lull, which had come under criticism. After the death of Cardinal Landolfo Brancaccio on 29 October 1312, King Robert conferred one of his abbeys on Caracciolo. He was seemingly ill by 1 March 1316, since he did not preside at the inception of Prosper of Reggio Emilia. He remained in Paris as chancellor until his death on 31 May 1316. On his deathbed he joined the Dominican Order.

== Works ==
Although Caracciolo was a very prominent theologian during his time at Paris, very few of his writings have survived. He was a defender of the Immaculate Conception and is usually cited by other as "the Chancellor" (Cancellarius).

There are several witnesses to Caracciolo's lectures on Book III of the Sentences. John of Saint-Germain's notes on the lectures are found in the manuscript Worcester, Cathedral Library, F 69 under the title Notabilia Cancellarii addita super tertium. In his commentary on the Sentences, Peter of Palude cites Caracciolo even more extensively while discussing Book III and once on Book I. An anonymous disciple of Palude's included similar quotations in his commentary, which is largely derivative of Palude's. It is found in the manuscript Barcelona, Arxiu de la Corona d'Aragó, Ripoll 77bis.

Reports also survive of Caracciolo's role as an opponent in the inception disputation of Thomas Wylton in late spring 1312. There is a report attached to the Notabilia Cancellarii in the Worcester manuscript and another in the notebook of Prosper of Reggio Emilia, now Vatican City, Biblioteca Apostolica Vaticana, lat. 1086. Prosper also records four questions from a disputation of Caracciolo's, probably that associated with his own inception.

The Vatican manuscript Borghese 171 contains one quodlibetal question by Caracciolo and a Quaestio de ydeis that may have been written by him but more probably by Thomas Wylton. Up to six quodlibetal disputations of which record survives, but the attribution of those in the Vatican manuscript Latin 932 to him is disputed.

There is a quire bound as part of the manuscript Paris, Bibliothèque nationale de France, Latin 15669 that was probably written by Caracciolo himself. The handwriting is small. It contains one partial and one complete draft of the letter to King Robert and a series of short texts probably composed by Caracciolo.

== Bibliography ==
- Courtenay, William J. (2013). "Francis Caracciolo, the Paris Chancellorship, and the Authorship of two Quodlibeta in Vat. lat. 932". Archives d'histoire doctrinale et littéraire du Moyen Âge. 80 (1): 49–83.
- Duba, William (2020). "The Bull in the Book: A 1308 Witness to the Career of Francesco Caracciolo, Chancellor of Paris". Fragmentology. 3: 141–148.
- Friedman, Russell L. (2007). "Dominican Quodlibetal Literature, ca. 1260–1330". In Christopher Schabel (ed.). Theological Quodlibeta in the Middle Ages: The Fourteenth Century. Leiden: Brill. pp. 401–491.
- Glorieux, Palémon (1976). "Caracciolo, Francesco". Dizionario Biografico degli Italiani, Volume 19: Cappi–Cardona (in Italian). Rome: Istituto dell'Enciclopedia Italiana. ISBN 978-8-81200032-6.
- Long, R. James (1968). "'Utrum iurista vel theologus plus proficiat ad regimen ecclesie': A Quaestio Disputata of Francis Caraccioli. Edition and Study". Mediaeval Studies. 30: 134–162.
