= William of Alnwick =

Franciscan friar and theologian

William of Alnwick (lat. Guillelmus Alaunovicanus, c. 1275 – March 1333) was a Franciscan friar and theologian, and bishop of Giovinazzo, who took his name from Alnwick in Northumberland.

Little is known of his early life. By 1303 he was a licensed doctor of theology at Paris, being then listed among the few foreign masters who sided with Philip IV, king of France, in his dispute with Pope Boniface VIII. Alnwick also lectured at other European centres of learning, including Montpellier, Bologna and Naples. He must have returned to England sometime in the second decade of the 14th century, as he is recorded as the forty-second Franciscan regent master at Oxford University, when Henry Harclay was chancellor of the university.

Alnwick's manuscript marginalia show that he was part of the contemporary debate which spread all over Europe, and which included the ideas of men such as Thomas Aquinas, Bonaventure, Henry of Ghent, Peter Auriol, James of Ascoli, Godfrey of Fontaines, Henry Harclay and Thomas Wilton. His main collaborator, however, was Duns Scotus, and it is this that has saved him from obscurity.

He worked with Scotus in the production of his Commentary on the Sentences (Ordinatio), took down one of his Collationes, and compiled the long additions (Additiones magnae) which were meant to fill the gaps in the Ordinatio. But although Alnwick based his philosophy and theology on the fundamental starting points of Scotus's teaching, he diverged from his colleague when he disagreed.

Alnwick participated in the general chapter of the Franciscan order held at Perugia in 1322, where he joined the theologians who drew up and signed the decree De paupertate Christi attacking the position on the poverty of the church as promulgated by Pope John XXII. In the last section of his Determinationes he argued that Christ and his apostles possessed nothing either personally or in common. This opposition to the papal position caused John to initiate proceedings against Alnwick, who fled to Naples, where King Robert protected him. In 1330, Robert had him appointed bishop of Giovinazzo.

He died in Avignon in March 1333.
