= Robert Orford =

Robert Orford or Robert of Orford may refer to:

- Robert of Orford (Dominican) (fl. 1293), theologian at Oxford
- Robert Orford (bishop) (died 1310), prior and then bishop of Ely
