= Giles of Rome =

Italian Catholic archbishop and philosopher (1243–1316)

Giles of Rome OSA
- Giles, from a 15th-century manuscript of De regimine principum
- Born: c. 1243; Rome, Papal States
- Died: 22 December 1316; Avignon, Kingdom of Burgundy-Arles
- Other name: Doctor Fundatissimus

Education
- Education: University of Paris

Philosophical work
- Era: Medieval philosophy
- Region: Western philosophy; Italian philosophy
- School: Aristotelianism; Thomism; Augustinianism
- Main interests: Metaphysics, logic, epistemology, natural philosophy, medicine, ethics, political philosophy

Giles of Rome OSA (Latin: Aegidius Romanus; Italian: Egidio Colonna; c. 1243 – 22 December 1316) was an Italian medieval philosopher and Scholastic theologian and a friar of the Order of St Augustine, who was also appointed to the positions of prior general of his order and as Archbishop of Bourges. He is famed as being a logician, who produced a commentary on the Organon by Aristotle, and as the author of two important works: De ecclesiastica potestate, a major text of early-14th-century papalism, and De regimine principum, a guide book for Christian temporal leadership. Giles was styled Doctor Fundatissimus ("Best-Grounded Teacher") by Pope Benedict XIV.

Writers in 14th- and 15th-century-England such as John Trevisa and Thomas Hoccleve translated or adapted him into English.

== Early life ==
Very little is known about his early life, although the Augustinian friar Jordan of Quedlinburg claimed in his Liber Vitasfratrum that Giles belonged to the noble Colonna family of Rome. But Jordan was not a contemporary of Giles, and many scholars remain sceptical of his account of Giles' early life. Having entered the Order of the Hermits of St. Augustine in Rome, he was sent by his Order to the University of Paris for his philosophical and theological studies, and there became a disciple of the Dominican Thomas Aquinas, and was later appointed to teach at the university, being the first of his Order to do so. It has been estimated that Giles was taught by Thomas Aquinas between 1269 and 1272, and in the years that followed, he produced many of his commentaries on the works of Aristotle, who had been experiencing an intellectual revival during the thirteenth century, and he also produced his commentary on Peter Lombard's Sentences. Giles remained in Paris studying and teaching theology until Bishop Étienne Tempier condemned the application of Aristotelianism within the Christian discourse, including those who had produced commentaries on Aristotle's work. Giles, whose work had been condemned, disappeared from the Parisian academic scene.

There is no information remaining concerning Giles between the period of 1277 and 1281, when he returned to Italy. However, in 1281, at the Thirty-sixth Council of Paris, in which several differences between the bishops and mendicant orders were dealt with, he sided with the bishops against the mendicants. In reference to this, a contemporary philosopher, Godfrey of Fontaines mentioned Giles as the most renowned theologian of the whole city (qui modo melior de tota villa in omnibus reputatur), suggesting that he might have been in Paris during this period before going back to Rome.

Philip III of France entrusted to Giles the education of his son and heir, who later, in 1285, ascended the throne as Philip IV. When the new king entered Paris after his consecration at Reims, Giles gave the welcoming address in the name of the university, insisting on justice as the most important virtue for a king to practice. In 1285 Giles' work was again called into question, but by 1287 he was allowed to continue teaching. Eight years later in 1295, Giles was appointed as the Archbishop of Bourges, which he wrote about in his work De renunciatione.

== Later life ==
Giles was involved in the condemnation of 1277 promulgated by Étienne Tempier. Several of his opinions had been found reprehensible by Archbishop Tempier, and in 1285 Pope Honorius IV asked him for a public retraction. This, however, was far from lessening his reputation, for in 1287 a decree of the general chapter of the Augustinians held in Florence, after remarking that Giles's doctrine "shines throughout the whole world" (venerabilis magistri nostri Ægidii doctrina mundum universum illustrat), commanded all members of the order to accept and defend all his opinions, written or to be written.

After filling several important positions in his order he was elected superior-general/prior-general, in 1292. Three years later Pope Boniface VIII appointed him Archbishop of Bourges, France, although Jean de Savigny had already been designated for this see by Pope Celestine V. The French nobility protested on the grounds that Giles was an Italian, but his appointment was maintained and approved by the king.

He was present at the Council of Vienne (1311–1312) in which the Order of Knights Templars was suppressed. He died in Avignon.

== Works ==
Giles of Rome presenting De Regimine Principum to Philip the Fair, from a contemporary manuscript

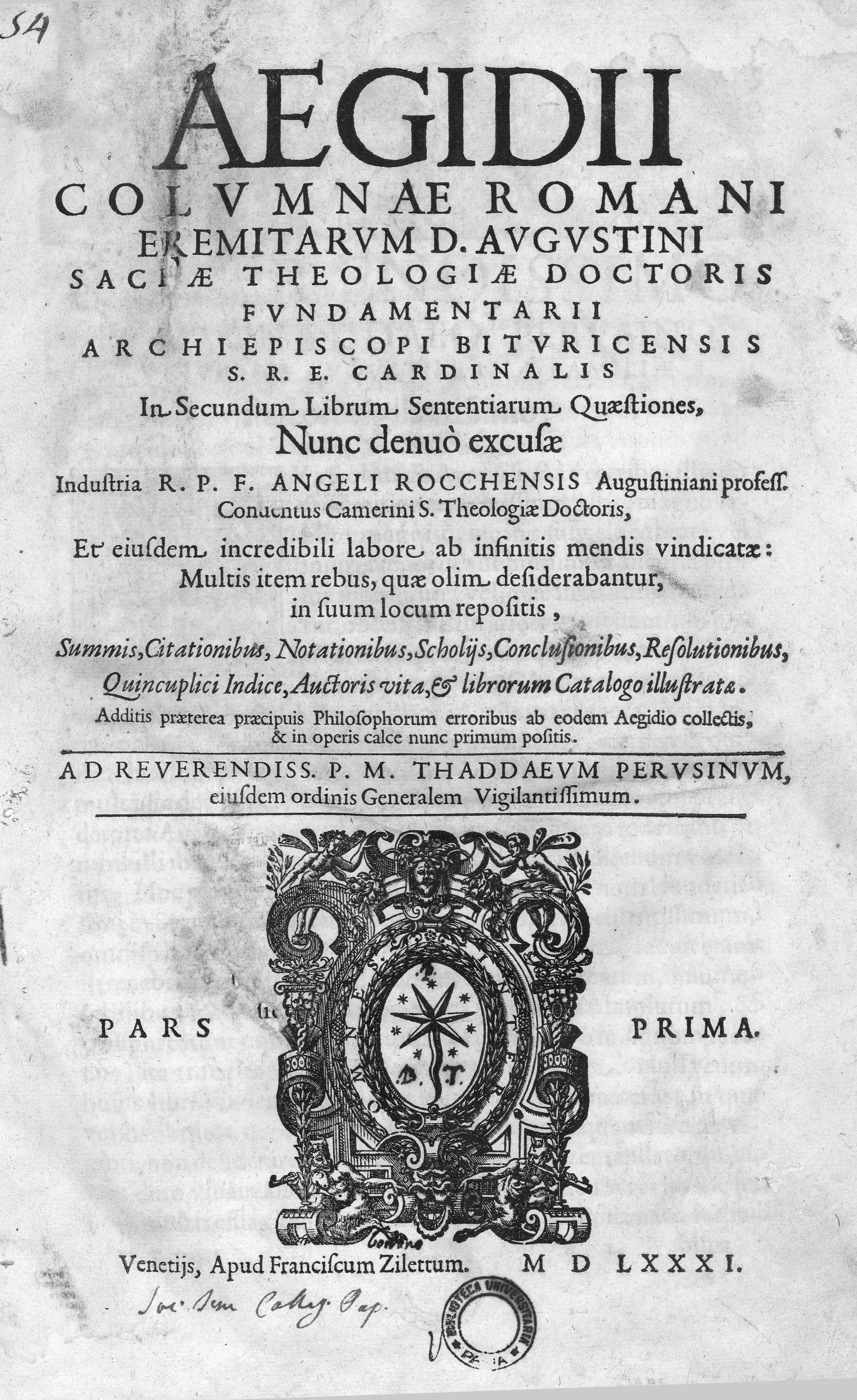
In secundum librum sententiarum quaestiones, 1581

His writings cover the fields of philosophy and theology. There is no complete edition of his works, but several treatises have been published separately.

In Holy Scripture and theology he wrote commentaries on the Hexaemeron, the Canticle of Canticles, and the Epistle to the Romans; several Opuscula and Quodlibeta, various treatises, and especially commentaries on Peter the Lombard's Four Books of Sentences.

In philosophy, besides commentaries on almost all the works of Aristotle, he wrote several special treatises. But his main work is the treatise De regimine principum, written for, and dedicated to, his pupil, Philip IV. It passed through many editions (the first, Augsburg, 1473) and was translated into several languages. The Roman edition of 1607 contains the life of Egidio. The work is divided into three books: the first treats the individual conduct of the king, the nature of his true happiness, the choice and acquisition of virtues, and the ruling of passions; the second deals with family life and the relations with wife, children, and servants; the third considers the State, its origin, and the proper mode of governing in times of peace and war.

Almost immediately, De regimine was translated into Old French by Henri de Gauchy. It was also translated into seven other European vernaculars, including Italian, and Middle English (by John Trevisa), and also Hebrew. It was the most copied "mirror for princes" alongside the Secreta secretorum.

His pedagogical writings have been published in German by Michael Kaufmann (Freiburg, 1904).

His attitude in the difficulties between Pope Boniface VIII and King Philip IV was long believed to have been favourable to the king. But it has been proved that he is the author of the treatise De potestate ecclesiastica, in which the rights of the pope are vindicated. The similarity between this treatise and the bull Unam Sanctam seems to support the view taken by some writers that he was the author of the bull.

He had already taken an active part in ending the discussions and controversies concerning the validity of Boniface's election to the papacy. In his treatise De renunciatione Papæ sive Apologia pro Bonifacio VIII he shows the legitimacy of Celestine's resignation and consequently of Boniface's election. In philosophy and theology, he generally follows the opinions of his master, St. Thomas, whose works he quotes as scripta communia.

The Defensorium seu Correctorium corruptorii librorum Sancti Thomæ Aquinatis against the Franciscan William de la Mare of Oxford is by some attributed to him, but this remains uncertain. Nevertheless, on many points, he holds independent views and abandons the Thomistic doctrine to follow the opinions of St. Augustine and of the Franciscan School. He even errs in asserting that, before the Fall, grace had not been given to Adam, an opinion which he wrongly attributes to St. Augustine.

Giles wrote a commentary on Guido Cavalcanti's philosophical love canzone "Donna me prega" (see Enrico Fenzi, La canzone d'amore di Guido Cavalcanti e i suoi antichi commenti, Melangolo, 1999).

== Aegidian school ==
After the decree of the general chapter of 1287, mentioned above, his opinions were generally accepted in the Augustinian Order. He thus became the founder of the Ægidian School. Among the most prominent representatives of this school must be mentioned Giacomo Capoccio of Viterbo (d. 1307) and Augustinus Triumphus (d. 1328), both of them his contemporaries, and also students and professors in the University of Paris: Prosper of Reggio Emilia, Albert of Padua, Gerard of Siena, Henry of Friemar, Thomas of Strasbourg – all in the first half of the fourteenth century.

For some time after this other opinions prevailed in the Augustinian Order. But as late as the seventeenth century should be mentioned Raffaello Bonerba (d. 1681) who wrote Disputationes totius philosophiæ … in quibus omnes philosophicæ inter D. Thomam et Scotum controversiæ principaliter cum doctrina nostri Ægidii Columnæ illustrantur (Palermo, 1645, 1671); and Agostino Arpe (d. 1704) who wrote Summa totius theologiæ Ægidii Columnæ (Bologna, 1701, and Genoa, 1704).

Federico Nicolò Gavardi (d. 1715), the most important interpreter of Colonna, composed Theologia exantiquata iuxta orthodoxam S. P. Augustini doctrinam ab Ægidio Columna doctore fundatissimo expositam … (6 vols. fol., Naples and Rome, 1683–1696); this work was abridged by Anselm Hörmannseder in his Hecatombe theologica (Presburg, 1737). Benignus Sychrovský (d. 1737) wrote also Philosophia vindicata ab erroribus philosophorum gentilium iuxta doctrinam S. Augustini et B. Ægidii Columnæ (Nuremberg, 1701).

== Translations ==
- Errores philosophorum. Translated by John O. Riedl. Milwaukee, WI: Marquette University Press. 1944.
- Theorems on Existence and Essence. Translated by Michael V. Murray. Milwaukee, WI: Marquette University Press. 1952.
- Giles of Rome on Ecclesiastical Power: The De ecclesiastica potestate of Aegidius Romanus. Translated by R.W. Dyson. Woodbridge: Boydell. 1986.
- On Ecclesiastical Power by Giles of Rome / De ecclesiastica potestate by Aegidius Romanus. Translated by Arthur P. Monahan. Lewiston, NY: Edwin Mellen Press. 1990.
- Commentary on the Song of Songs and Other Writings. Translated by J. Rotelle. Villanova, PA: Augustinian Press. 1998. ISBN 978-0941491952.
- On Ecclesiastical Power: A Medieval Theory of World Government. Edited and translated by R.W. Dyson. New York: Columbia University Press. 2004. ISBN 978-0231128025.

== See also ==
- Angelo da Furci
- Henry of Ghent
