= Peter of Navarre =

Peter of Navarre may refer to:

- Peter I of Aragon and Pamplona, king of Navarre from 1094 until 1104
- Peter of Atarrabia, Franciscan provincial minister of Aragon from 1317 until 1346
- Pedro, Marshal of Navarre (d. 1522)

== See also ==
- Pedro Navarro
