= John of Paris =

French philosopher, theologian, and Dominican friar

John of Paris OP (in French Jean de Paris), also called Jean Quidort and Johannes de Soardis (c. 1255 – September 22, 1306), was a French philosopher, theologian, and Dominican friar.

== Life ==
John of Paris was born in Paris at an unknown date. Having obtained the degree of Master of Arts with distinction, he joined the Dominican Order, when about twenty years of age, at the Convent of St. James in his native city. There he taught philosophy and theology, and obtained the degree of Master of Theology. He was endowed with great ability, possessed great literary and linguistic attainments, and was considered one of the best theologians of the university and one of the most subtle dialecticians of the age."

"In his work on the temporal and spiritual power, De potestate regia et papali, written during the controversy between Boniface VIII and Philip the Fair, he favours the king."

After John wrote a treatise contradicting the normal Church doctrine on transubstantiation, the faculty of the university reported his ideas to William of Baufet, Bishop of Paris, who forbade John under penalty of excommunication to defend such a doctrine, and deprived him of the offices of lecturing, preaching, and hearing confessions. John appealed to the Holy See, but died soon after in Bordeaux, and the case was dropped.

== Works ==
Some ten of his works on theology, physics, and metaphysics still exist in manuscript; two others, De Antichristo and De modo existendi corporis Christi in sacramento altaris, appeared in print centuries after his death. A treatise, Contra corruptorem Sancti Thomae, published in 1516 under the name of Aegidius Romanus (Giles of Rome), is commonly attributed to John of Paris; it was certainly not written by Aegidius. All these show vast erudition.

More troublesome in the eyes of the Church was John's treatise on the Blessed Sacrament, in which he maintains that the Body of Christ is, or might be, present by assumption (i.e. by the body of Christ assuming the bread and wine), and that the doctrine of transubstantiation is not of faith. It must be said, however, that he advances these propositions tentatively; in the beginning of the treatise he writes that he believes in the Catholic doctrine of transubstantiation and that if it is shown that transubstantiation is of faith, or should it be so defined, he will willingly retract.

The following works are among those authored by him:

- Commentarium in IV sententiarum libros.
- Abbreviatio librorum naturalis philosophiae Aristotelis.
- (Determinatio) de modo existendi corporis Christi in sacramento altaris.
- De adventu Christi secundum carnem.
- Compendium libri Physicorum.
- De potestate regia et papali.
- De formis.
- Quaestio De principio individuationis.
- Determinatio de confessionibus fratrum.
- Various other Quaestiones disputatae.
- Quodlibeta.
- Sermones .
- Tractatus de Antichristo

Translations

- On Royal and Papal Power, tr. JA Watt, (Toronto, 1971)

== 20th century references ==
John's name re-appeared in the early 20th century, when Distributist writers such as the Catholics Hilaire Belloc and G. K. Chesterton attributed to him the earliest statement of the capitalist philosophy in De potestate regia et papali.
