= Francesco Caracciolo =

Francesco Caracciolo may refer to:

- Francesco Caracciolo (theologian) (died 1316)
- Francis Caracciolo (1563–1608), co-founder of the Clerics Regular Minor
- Francesco Caracciolo (naval officer) (1752–1799), Neapolitan admiral
- Francesco Caracciolo, lead ship of the cancelled Francesco Caracciolo-class battleship
