= Angelo da Furci =

Blessed Angelo da Furci OSA
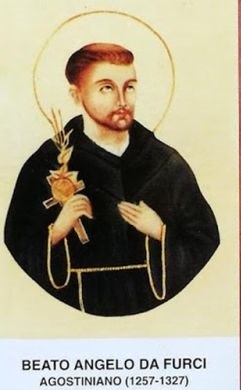
- Born: 1246; Furci, Chieti, Kingdom of Sicily
- Died: 6 February 1327 (aged 81); Naples, Kingdom of Naples
- Venerated in: Roman Catholic Church
- Beatified: 20 December 1888, Saint Peter's Basilica by Pope Leo XIII
- Feast: 6 February
- Attributes: Augustinian habit, crucifix
- Patronage: Naples

Angelo da Furci (1246 - 6 February 1327) was an Italian Catholic priest and a professed member of the Order of Saint Augustine. He was a friend and student of Giles of Rome and served as Prior Provincial of the Abruzzi branch of the congregation.

The recognition of his "cultus" (or popular following) allowed for Pope Leo XIII to preside over his beatification on 20 December 1888.

== Life ==
Angelo da Furci was born in 1246 to Adalitto and Albazia. The couple was childless and begged for the intercession of Saint Michael the Archangel for a son.

During his childhood he was sent to a Benedictine convent where his maternal uncle served as the Abbot. He received his education there at the convent of Cornaclano until the death of his uncle in 1264, which prompted him to return home; he completed his philosophical and literary studies with high results. Adalitto fell ill in 1265 and revealed to his son the truth about the circumstances of his birth while suggesting that his son become a member of the Order of Saint Augustine; his father died not long after. The death of his father solidified his decision to do so but he did not seek admission straight after since he remained at home with his aging and despairing mother in order to care for her.

In 1266 he left his home and requested permission to join the order while starting his period of novitiate and making his profession. He underwent theological studies until 1270 when he was ordained to the priesthood. He was then sent to Paris in 1271 for further studies where one of his teachers was Giles of Rome - the latter became a close friend as well. The priest earned a Lector's Degree in 1276 and then taught theological studies back in Abruzzo for 5 years. Officials made the unanimous decision in a meeting of 1287 to elect him as Prior Provincial of the Abruzzese branches of the order and he refused at first before Clement of Osimo required him to accept the nomination. He proved competent and became well known for his evangelic zeal and his uprightness as well as being noted for his gentleness of spirit. He was also a skilled orator.

The priest also renounced episcopal appointments to the sees of Melfi and Acerra that Pope Nicholas IV offered to him.

He retired at the age of 81 due to his declining health and died not long after in 1327. His remains were later transferred in August 1808.

== Beatification ==
His beatification received the approval of Pope Leo XIII on 20 December 1888 in approval of the "cultus" (or popular devotion) to the late priest. The process for sainthood was formally opened on 22 March 1922.
