= Thomas of Sutton =

English Dominican theologian and Thomist

Thomas of Sutton (died after 1315) was an English Dominican theologian, an early Thomist.

He was ordained as deacon in 1274 by Walter Giffard, and joined the Dominicans in the 1270s; he may have been a Fellow of Merton College, Oxford before that. He became doctor of theology in 1282.

== Works ==
He wrote a large number of works, in some of which he opposed Duns Scotus.

The following works are among those authored by him:

- Commentarium in IV sententiarum libros
- Contra pluralitatem formarum
- De productione formae substantialis
- Liber propugnatorius contra I Sent. Duns Scoti
- Super IV librum Sent. Duns Scoti
- Contra Quodlibeta Joh. Duns Scoti
- Contra librum primum et quartum commentarii Oxoniensis Johannis Duns Scoti
- Contra I-III lib. Sent. Roberti Cowton
- Impugnat. Aegidium Romanum
- De ente et essentia
- Quaestiones disputatae
- Quaestiones ordinariae
- Quodlibeta
- Sermones
