= William Crathorn =

English philosopher

- Born: Yorkshire, England
- Era: Medieval philosophy
- Region: Western philosophers
- School: Scholasticism
- Main interests: Epistemology, philosophy of language, ontology

William Crathorn (fl. c. 1330) was an English Dominican philosopher, from Oxford. He was a philosopher who immediately followed in the intellectual tradition of William of Ockham and worked to strengthen his philosophical works. Crathorn created unique theories in the philosophy of language and psychology, as well as in epistemology by focusing on the claims of skeptics. Other areas of Crathorn's philosophy, which have not been extensively studied, show promise is revealing more about his life and his work.

== Life ==
Almost nothing is certain about Crathorn's life outside of his position as lecturer at Oxford. Crathorn was born in Yorkshire and served as a Dominican friar, lecturing on a book from Peter the Lombard entitled Sentences. Crathorn is also known to have lectured on the Bible during his time teaching. His date of birth and death are unknown; the year in which he lectured is known only by an eclipse mentioned in his manuscripts which is known to have occurred in July 1330.

== Epistemology ==
Crathorn's philosophy focuses mainly upon epistemology and the problem of knowledge. His thoughts on knowledge resemble closely those of Roger Bacon, who held that knowledge of the external world comes from recognition of different "species" of objects. The species which is perceived is both a cause and a likeness in the eye of the perceiver. Crathorn asserts a somewhat Kantian view that we have no direct access to things in the external world and that we immediately perceive only their mental likenesses or representations (their species). Crathorn believed that since concepts can only belong to the category of quality, they must be mental qualities having the same nature as non-mental qualities and they must exist subjectively in the mind, which is to say that they exist in some part of the brain. To illuminate this theory, he offered theories of explaining brain function and how such relates to the philosophy of knowledge.

Crathorn affirms that whenever one is contemplating a certain concept, the mind of the person thinking it actually mirrors the concept. He thought that mental concepts cannot resemble substances but only qualities of substances because the species of substance would have to be a substance itself and our minds would turn into a new substance if we thought of it. It also cannot be a pure quantity because in thinking of infinite magnitudes, our minds would become infinite, and the same is true for the other categories besides quality. Crathorn held that one's ability to conceptualize is therefore limited to natural concepts of qualities, which in being conceived become qualities of the soul.

Crathorn also looked into the skeptical challenges which he anticipated in the problem of knowledge. To refute skeptical claims, he turned back to the cogito-argument to prove that we can at least be certain of our own mental activity, for if one were to doubt a proposition such as ‘I am’, it would follow that he exists, since he who does not exist does not doubt.

== Philosophy of language ==
Like much philosophical discussion during his time in England, Crathorn considered the linguistic aspects of science. He questioned whether that when we know something scientifically, is that knowledge about external things, propositions, or some other more complex thing. It is believed that Crathorn popularized the notion that neither the external aspect or the proposition is the proper object of science, that the "total significance" of the proposition is most important.

He also discussed the nature of mental language, namely whether it is conventional or natural. Crathorn's predecessors had argued that thinking occurs in a universal language of concepts acquired causally via experience, and that all conventional languages are subordinated to this mental language, which is shared by everyone in an a priori fashion. But Crathorn could not accept such a position because of his view that only qualities are natural signs of their extra-mental significates. Crathorn argued that except for natural signs of qualities, mental language is conventional because it is derived from conventional language. Hence, whatever language one speaks in his head is modeled on that language used for external communication. Crathorn was the revolutionary in his time to affirm that words are prior to ideas and that ideas are shaped by words.

== Ontology ==
Crathorn differed from the standard system of Aristotle of categories. Crathorn felt the entire system had to be revised; the human mind naturally knows only qualities, and one cannot be certain that even they exist without appealing to the principle that God could not deceive us. Thinking and reasoning are of no help because they are purely conventional. For example, the category of substance is distinguished from the other categories by the fact that it has no contrary and can successively acquire contrary qualities. Thus, there are no non-substances, though a substance can be black and then white in succession, or cold and then gradually hot. But Crathorn claims that when we heat an object, not only the substance but also its qualities become hot, such that its qualities change from one state to their contrary exactly like a substance.

== Works ==
- Quaestiones super librum sententiarum

== See also ==
- William of Ockham
