= Jordan of Quedlinburg =

Jordan of Quedlinburg (Latin: Jordanus de Saxonia; c. 1300 – 1380) was an Augustinian hermit, influential writer and preacher. He is known for his advocacy of a moderate asceticism.

== Biography ==
Jordan was born around 1300 in Quedlinburg in the Duchy of Saxony. He studied at the Augustinian seminaries in Bologna (1317–1319) and Paris (1319–1322) under Henry of Friemar, Hermann of Halle and Prosper of Reggio Emilia. He graduated with the degree of lector and was appointed to a lectureship at the Augustinian studium generale in Erfurt, where he taught from 1327 at the latest until 1333. By 1336 he had transferred to the studium generale of Magdeburg, where stayed until 1338. He lectured in various other Augustinian houses in Germany and in 1341 was appointed provincial of Saxony, an office to which he was reappointed continuously until 1351. In Saxony he reorganized the Augustinians into a mendicant order. In 1343 he was appointed visitor of the Augustinian province of France.

Jordan's later life and the date and circumstances of his death are disputed. He is thought to have lived for a time in Vienna in the Duchy of Austria, dying there in 1380. Several of his associates are known to have been connected to the University of Vienna, founded in 1365. Some scholars, however, believe that he spent his final years in Vienne in the Dauphiné and died there. His death is usually placed in 1380, but sometimes as early as 1370.

== Works ==
Jordan of Quedlinburg is remembered chiefly for his preaching and his spiritual writings. His sermons were popular in the later Middle Ages and one collection circulated widely. His spirituality was influenced by German mysticism, but he attacked the excesses of the ascetic movement. His most important work in this vein was his Liber vitasfratrum, which was printed at Rome in 1587. His other known works include:

- Meditations on the Passion of Christ;
- Tractatus de spiritu libertatis (lost);
- Expositio dominicae orationis (unpublished);
- Opus postillarum et sermonum de tempore (printed at Strasbourg in 1483);
- Sermones de sanctis (Paris, 1484);
- Collectanea seu Speculum Augustinianum (Paris, 1686).

== Bibliography ==
- Hamburger, Jeffrey E. (2010). "New Fragments of an Alsatian Copy of Jordan of Quedlinburg's Sixty-Five Articles on the Passion". Harvard Library Bulletin. 21: 95–123.
- Plöchl, W. M. (2003). "Jordan of Quedlinburg". New Catholic Encyclopedia. Vol. 7. Catholic University of America Press. pp. 1032–1033.
- Saak, Eric L. (2013). "Jordan of Quedlinburg (c.1299–1380)". In Karla Pollmann; Willemien Otten (eds.). The Oxford Guide to the Historical Reception of Augustine. Oxford University Press.
- Weinbrenner, Ralph (2009). "Jordan of Quedlinburg". In Hans Dieter Betz; Don Browning; Bernd Janowski; Eberhard Jüngel (eds.). Religion Past and Present: Encyclopedia of Theology and Religion. Vol. 6 (4th ed.). Brill. doi:10.1163/1877-5888_rpp_SIM_10969.
- Werner, Karl (1881). "Jordan von Quedlinburg" . Allgemeine Deutsche Biographie (in German). Vol. 14. Leipzig: Duncker & Humblot. p. 504.
- Zumkeller, Adolar (1992). "Jordan von Quedlinburg". In Bautz, Friedrich Wilhelm (ed.). Biographisch-Bibliographisches Kirchenlexikon (BBKL) (in German). Vol. 3. Herzberg: Bautz. cols. 649–652. ISBN 3-88309-035-2.
- Zumkeller, Adolar (1974). "Jordan von Quedlinburg". Neue Deutsche Biographie (in German). Vol. 10. Berlin: Duncker & Humblot. pp. 597–598. (full text online).
