= Guerric of Saint-Quentin =

Guerric of Saint-Quentin (Latin: Guerricus de Sancto Quintino or Guerricus Flandrensis) was a Dominican friar, theologian and teacher at the University of Paris from 1233/5 until 1242. He wrote several works on biblical exegesis and theology. Along with Alexander of Hales, he is often credited with inventing the genre of the quodlibeta.

Guerric entered the Dominican order around 1225. References in his commentary on Isaiah suggest that he had earlier received training in medicine. His first posting as a Dominican was a lectorship at the Basilica of San Domenico in Bologna. Sometime between 1233 and 1235 he became master of theology at the Dominican Collège de Saint-Jacques attached to the University of Paris. Among his colleagues were Hugh of Saint-Cher and Geoffrey of Bléneau; among his probable students, Albert the Great. He died between 1243 and 1245.

Guerric's major works are his biblical commentaries. Besides Isaiah, he wrote commentaries on Job, Proverbs, Ecclesiastes, Song of Songs, Sirach, Wisdom, Ezekiel, Luke, John, Acts, all twelve Minor Prophets and all of the traditional Pauline epistles. All these have survived, but none have been critically edited or published. Guerric held closely to a literal interpretation.

Besides his exegetical works, he also wrote one of the earliest quodlibeta, Quaestiones de quolibet, which has been edited and published, and also a commentary on Peter Lombard's Sentences. His thinking was more influenced by Aristotelianism than his contemporaries.

== Sources ==
- Canty, Aaron (2011). Light and Glory: The Transfiguration of Christ in Early Franciscan and Dominican Theology. Washington, D.C.: Catholic University of America Press.
- Bullido del Barrio, Susana (2015). "Guerric of Saint-Quentin". Encyclopedia of the Bible and its Reception. Vol. 10. Berlin: De Gruyter. pp. 991–992.
- Schabel, Christopher (2006). Theological Quodlibeta in the Middle Ages: The Thirteenth Century. Leiden: Brill.
