= Principle of individuation =

Concept in metaphysics

The principle of individuation is a criterion that individuates or numerically distinguishes the members of the kind for which it is given, that is by which we can supposedly determine, regarding any kind of thing, when we have more than one of them or not. It is also known as a 'criterion of identity' or 'indiscernibility principle'. The history of the consideration of such a principle begins with Aristotle. It was much discussed by the medieval philosopher Duns Scotus (c. 1266–1308) with his "haecceity" and later, during the Renaissance, by Francisco Suárez (1548–1617), Bonaventure Baron (1610–1696) and Leibniz (1646–1716).

== Aristotle ==
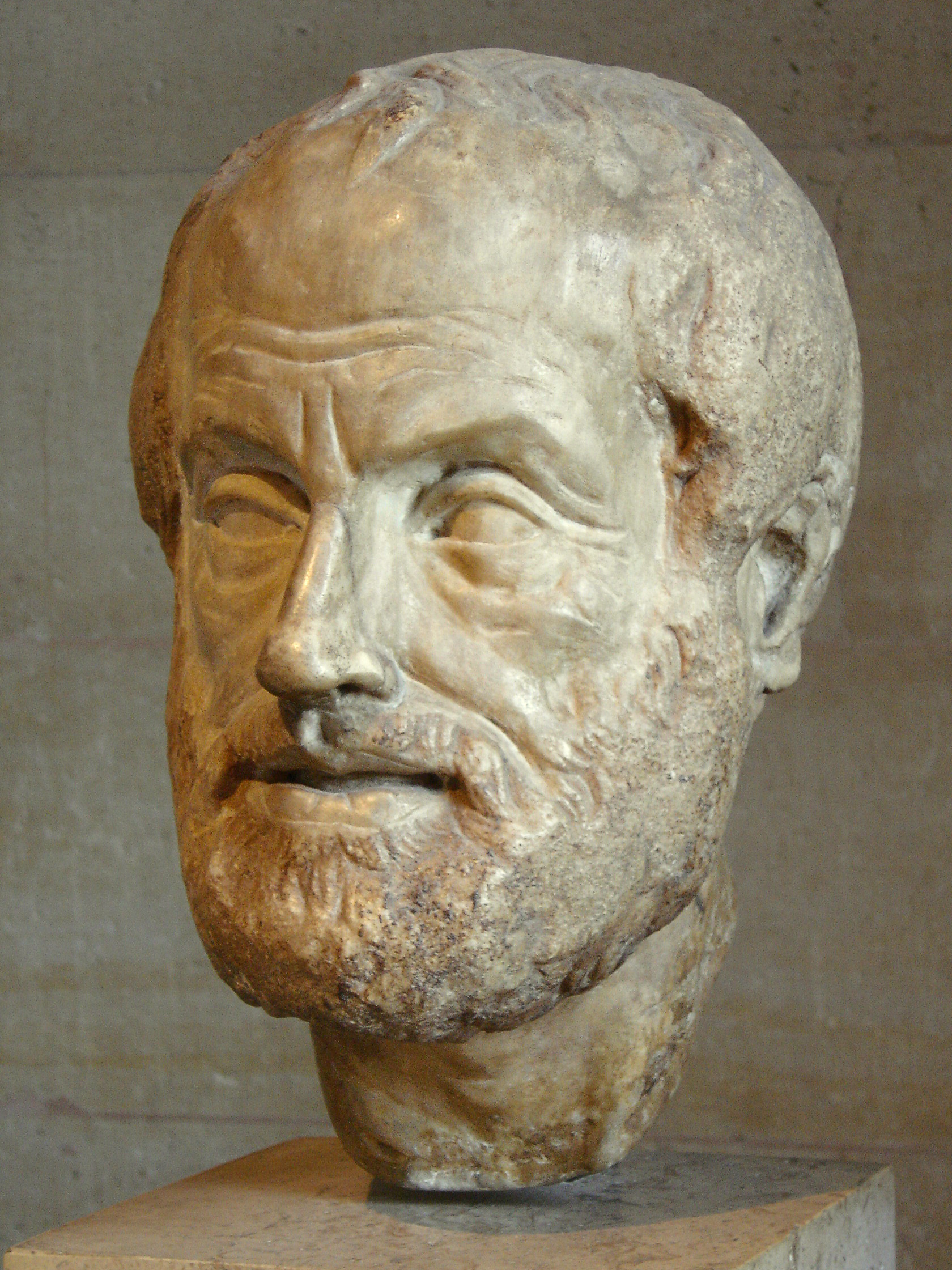
Aristotle

Taking issue with the view expressed in certain Platonic dialogues that universal forms (such as the Good, the Just, the Triangular and so on) constitute reality, Aristotle (384–322 BC) regarded an individual as something real in itself. An individual therefore has two kinds of unity: specific and numerical. Specific unity (that is unity of the species to which an individual belongs) is a unity of nature which the individual shares with other individuals, for example, twin daughters are both human females, and share a unity of nature. This specific unity, according to Aristotle, is derived from Form, for it is form (which the medieval philosophers called quiddity) which makes an individual substance the kind of thing it is. But two individuals (such as the twins) can share exactly the same form, yet not be one in number. What is the principle by which two individuals differ in number alone? This cannot be a common property. What is the criterion for a thing being an individual? In a passage much-quoted by the medievals, Aristotle attributes the cause of individuation to matter:

The whole thing, such and such a form in this flesh and these bones, is Callias or Socrates; and they are different owing to their matter (for this is different), but the same in species, for the species is indivisible.

Bonaventure later argued that there is no form of which we cannot imagine a similar one, thus there can be 'identical' twins, triplets, quadruplets and so on. For any such form would then be common to several things, and therefore not an individual at all.

== Middle Ages ==
=== Boethius to Aquinas ===
The late Roman philosopher Boethius (480–524) touches upon the subject in his second commentary on Porphyry's Isagoge, where he says that things which are individuals and are discrete only in number, differ only by accidental properties. Philosopher Avicenna (980–1037) first introduced a term which was later translated into Latin as signatum, meaning 'determinate individual'. Avicenna argues that a nature is not of itself individual, the relation between it and individuality is an accidental one, and we must look for its source not in its essence, but among accidental attributes such as quantity, quality, space and time. However, he did not work out any definite or detailed theory of individuation. His successor Averroes (1126–1198) argued that matter is numerically one, since it is undetermined in itself and has no definite boundaries. However, since it is divisible, this must be caused by quantity, and matter must therefore have the potential for determination in three dimensions (in the same way a rough and unhewn lump of marble has the potential to be sculpted into a statue).

The theories of Averroes and Avicenna had a great influence on the later theory of Thomas Aquinas (1224–1274). Aquinas never doubted the Aristotelian theory of individuation by matter, but was uncertain which of the theories of Avicenna or Averroes was correct. He first accepted the theory of Avicenna that the principle of individuation is matter designated (signata) by determinate dimensions, but later abandoned this in favour of the Averroist theory that it is matter affected by undeterminated dimension which is the principle. Later still, he seems to have returned to the first theory when he wrote the Quodlibeta.

=== Scotus to Suárez ===
Giles of Rome (1243–1316) believed that individuation happens by the quantity in the matter.

Duns Scotus held that individuation comes from the numerical determination of form and matter whereby they become this form and this matter. Individuation is distinguished from a nature by means of a formal distinction on the side of the thing. Later followers of Scotus called this principle haecceity or 'thisness'. The nominalist philosopher William of Ockham (1287–1347) regarded the principle as unnecessary and indeed meaningless, since there are no realities independent of individual things. An individual is distinct of itself, not multiplied in a species, since species are not real (they correspond only to concepts in our mind). His contemporary Durandus held that individuation comes about through actual existence. Thus the common nature and the individual nature differ only as one conceived and one existing.

The late scholastic philosopher Francisco Suárez held, in opposition to Scotus, that the principle of individuation can only be logically distinguished from the individual being. Every being, even an incomplete one, is individual of itself, by reason of its being a thing. Suárez maintained that, although the humanity of Socrates does not differ from that of Plato, yet they do not constitute in reality one and the same humanity; there are as many "formal unities" (in this case, humanities) as there are individuals, and these individuals do not constitute a factual, but only an essential or ideal unity. The formal unity, however, is not an arbitrary creation of the mind, but exists in the nature of the thing before any operation of the understanding.

== Modern philosophy ==
Simon Blackburn refers in his Oxford Dictionary of Philosophy to a "relaxed attitude" whereby the principle of individuation is assessed contextually. W. V Quine considers the need for a more systematic approach to understanding individuation in his Speaking of Objects, published in 1958.

== See also ==
- Individuation
- Self (Jung)
- Law of indiscernibles

== Bibliography ==
- Butler, Joseph, Dissertation on Personal Identity in Works, I (Oxford, 1896), 387 sqq..
- Hume, David, Enquiry concerning Human Understanding (London and Edinburgh, 1764).
- Kim, Jaegwon, Ernest Sosa, A Companion to Metaphysics Blackwell Publishing, 1995.
- Leibniz, De principio individui in Werke, ed. Gerhardt (Berlin, 1875–90).
- -----, Nouveaux essais sur l'entendement humain (New York and London, 1896), II, xxvii.
- Mill, J.S., Examination of Hamilton's Philosophy (London, 1865), xii.
- Phillips, R.P., Modern Thomistic Philosophy, London 1934.
- Reid, T., Essay on the Intellectual Powers, III (Edinburgh, 1812).
- Ueberweg, F., History of Philosophy, I (London, 1874).
