= James of Viterbo =

Roman Catholic Archbishop

Blessed James of Viterbo O.S.A.
- Archbishop of Naples
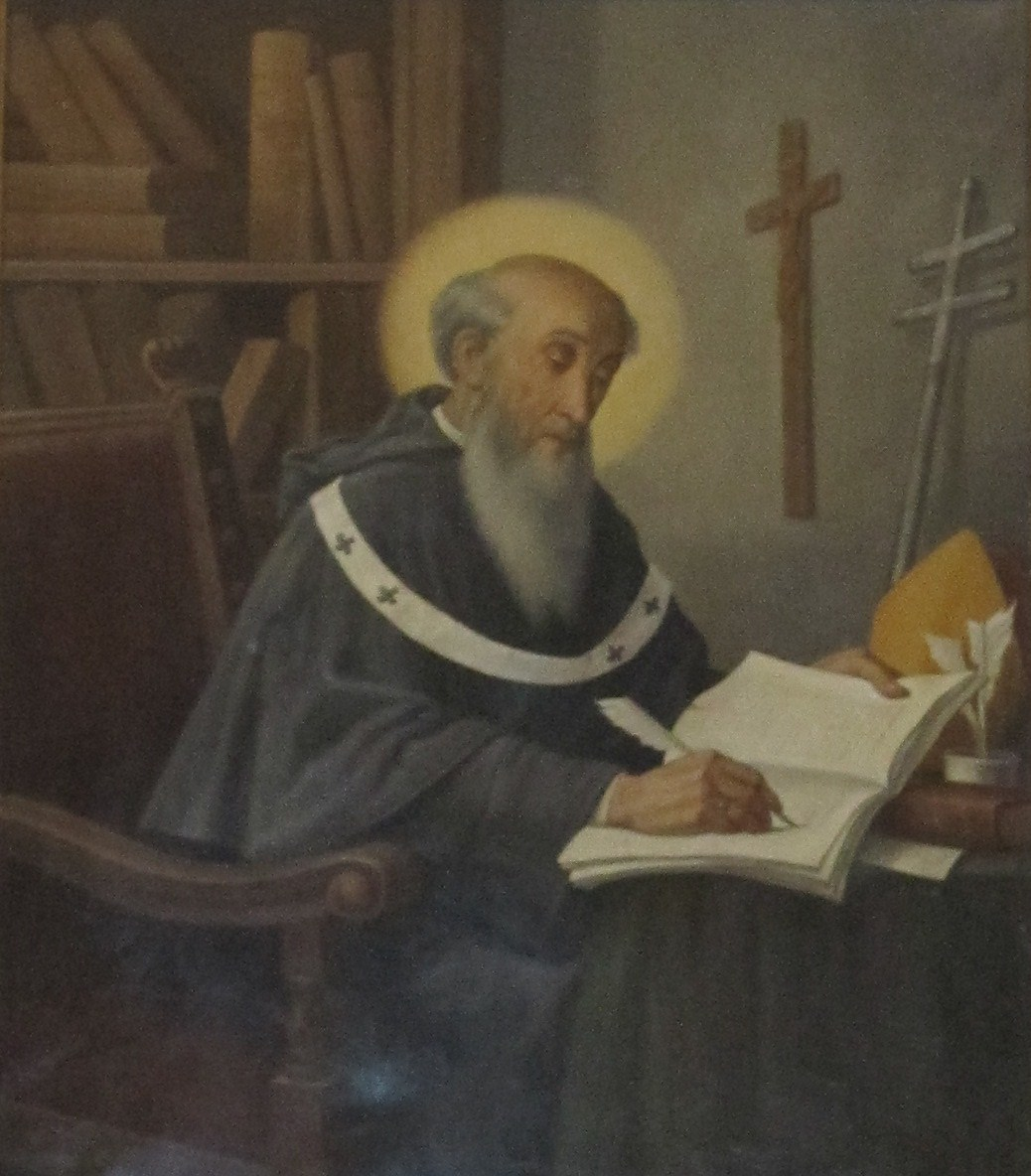
- Painting in Viterbo.
- Church: Roman Catholic Church
- Archdiocese: Naples
- Metropolis: Naples
- See: Naples
- Appointed: 12 December 1302
- Installed: 1303
- Term ended: 1307
- Predecessor: Giovanni de Alatre
- Successor: Monaldo Monaldeschi
- Previous post: Archbishop of Benevento (1302)

Orders
- Consecration: 1302
- Rank: Archbishop

Personal details
- Born: Giacomo Capocci c. 1255 Viterbo, Papal States
- Died: c. 1307 Naples, Kingdom of Naples
- Denomination: Roman Catholic
- Education: University of Paris

Sainthood
- Feast day: 4 June
- Venerated in: Roman Catholic Church
- Beatified: 14 June 1911; Saint Peter's Basilica, Kingdom of Italy by Pope Pius X
- Attributes: Archbishop's attire; Augustinian habit; Book
- Patronage: Writers; Scholars

James of Viterbo OSA (Italian: Giacomo da Viterbo; c. 1255 – c. 1307), born Giacomo Capocci (nicknamed Doctor speculativus), was an Italian Roman Catholic Augustinian friar and Scholastic theologian, who later became Archbishop of Naples.

== Life ==
James was born Giacomo Capocci in Viterbo in the Papal States around the year 1255. Little information is available regarding his early years. He joined the Order of St. Augustine around the year 1272 at the monastery of the Most Holy Trinity in Viterbo. He was then sent to pursue theological studies at the Order's General House of Studies in Paris, where he studied under Giles of Rome.

Capocci is first mentioned in the surviving historical records in the year 1283 in the capitular acts of the Augustinians’ Roman province as a recently appointed lecturer in the Convent of Viterbo, meaning that he must have spent at least five years at the University of Paris, because the Augustinian Order required its lecturers to be trained in Theology in that city for a duration of five years. Giacomo returned to Paris for further studies, as his name is again mentioned in the capitular acts in 1288, where he is said to hold a Bachelor of Theology degree from the University of Paris.

Capocci received his Master of Theology degree in 1293, and taught in Paris for the next seven years, during which time his output was extensive as all of his works in the fields of speculative theology and metaphysics date from this time. In 1299 he became the Order's Regent of Studies. Around the year 1300, he was named as a member of the governing council of the Augustinian Roman Province by the Augustinians’ General Chapter. At the General Chapter of 1300, he had a very public disagreement with the Prior General, Agostino Novello, when he defended a German friar who he believed may have been unjustly accused of something. In May 1300, he became regent master of the order's studium generale in Naples.

In September 1302, Pope Boniface VIII appointed him Archbishop of Benevento, In December 1302, at the request of King Charles II of Naples, Capocci was transferred to the Archbishopric of Naples, where he oversaw construction of the Cathedral of the Assumption of Mary.

In 1303 Capocci obtained his Doctor of Theology, and published the treatise, De regimine christiano (On Christian Government). He was considered by his peers to be one of the best scholastic theologians of his time.

He died in Naples in 1307, where he was venerated as a holy man. His cult was confirmed by Pope Pius X in June 1914 He is commemorated in the Augustinian order on 4 June.

== Work ==
James wrote several works that reflected the teachings of Augustine of Hippo. The works authentically attributed to him are listed as follows:

- Lectura super IV libros Sententiarum
- Quaestiones Parisius disputatae De praedicamentis in divinis
- Quaestione de animatione caeli
- Quaestiones disputatae de Verbo
- Quodlibeta quattuor (four quodlibets)
- Abbreviatio in Sententiarum Aegidii Romani
- De perfectione specierum
- De regimine christiano
- Summa de peccatorum distinctione
- Sermones diversarum rerum
- Concordantia psalmorum David
- De confessione
- De episcopali officio

== Sources ==
- H. X. Arquillière (1926), Le plus ancien traité de l'Eglise: J., De regimine Christiano
- R. W. Dyson (1995), James of Viterbo: On Christian Government (De regimine Christiano)
