= Hervaeus Natalis =

French Dominican philosopher (c.1260–1323)

Hervaeus Natalis (c. 1260, Nédellec, diocese of Tréguier, Brittany – 1323), also known as de Nédellec, was a Dominican theologian, the 14th Master of the Dominicans, and the author of a number of works on philosophy and theology. His many writings include the Summa Totius Logicae, an opusculum once attributed to Thomas Aquinas.

== Life ==
Natalis joined the Dominicans in 1276. In 1303, he entered the convent of St. Jacques at the University of Paris. On his arrival to St. Jacques, he signed a petition supporting Philip the Fair's attempt to convoke a council in his war with Pope Boniface VIII on grounds of papal jurisdiction.

He studied theology in Paris and became French provincial of the Dominicans in 1308. Later in 1318, he was appointed Master General of the Order.

A resolute early Thomist, nicknamed Doctor rarus, he was a tenacious opponent of the theology of Durandus of Saint-Pourçain. He also opposed Scotism. He sought for and obtained the canonization of Aquinas.

He became Master of the Order of Preachers in 1318, a post he held until he died in 1323 on the way to attend the canonization of Thomas Aquinas.

== As Master of the Order ==
Natalis' tenure as master general of the Order was focused on removing the corruption prevalent in the Dominican Order. He ordered a series of acts that limited the privileges of the elites within the Order. These acts ordered high members of the Order to take part in choir and eat in the refectory along with abolishing the use of titles1. In addition to these acts, Natalis sought to reign in the studia generalia by abolishing the title magister. He also sought to centralize the curriculum and appointments of the studia generalia to the Master General.

== Differences with Durandus of St. Pourçain ==
While Natalis was Durandus' mentor, the two scholars disputed on numerous theological ideas. In a commission investigating the works of Durandus, Natalis found 91 objectionable propositions. From 1309 to 1316, a polemical war ensued between Hervaeus Natalis and Durandus of St. Pourçain. Throughout those years, both Natalis and Durandus of St. Pourçain exchanged polemics and writings that sought to disprove the other. Near the end of this war, Hervaeus Natalis compiled two censure lists, one in 1314 and one in 1316. These lists gathered the problematic tenets of Durandus' works, and in turn, compelled Durandus to revise his work.

Notable works concerning this polemical war include Reprobationes excusationum Durandi, Quodlibet III, and Correctiones super dicta Durandi in Quodlibet Avenonense I. These works either reprimanded Durandus or responded to Durandus' counterattacks to Natalis' arguments. One of Natalis' most significant counters to Durandus was in his Evidentiae contra Durandum super IVum Sent., in which Natalis examines 38 articles where Durandus deviated from the teachings of Aquinas regarding the sacraments. Hervaeus defended Aquinas's theological method in his Defensio doctrinae fratris Thomae and his theory of knowledge in his Quodlibeta. He actively promoted the canonization of Aquinas and died at Narbonne in 1323 on his way to it. Due largely to the work of Hervaeus, Aquinas became the official doctor of the Dominican Order, despite the conservative Augustinian atmosphere in the period after 1277.

== Works ==
- Theologie und Wissenschaft nach der Lehre der Hochscholastik: an der Hand der bisher ungedruckten Defensa doctrinae D.Thomae des Hervaeus Natalis / mit Beifügung gedruckter und ungedruckter Paralleltexte von Engelbert Krebs. Münster: Aschendorff, 1912 (per excerpta); La Opinio de difficultatibus contra doctrinam fratris Thome di Erveo di Nédellec, edizione critica a cura di Paolo Piccari, "Memorie Domenicane", Nuova Serie 26, 1995, pp. 5-198.
- Durandi de S. Porciano OP Quaestio de natura cognitionis: (2. Sent. [A] D. 3 Q. 5) et Disputatio cum anonymo quodam nec non Determinatio Hervei Natalis OP (Quol. 3 Q. 8) ad fidem manuscriptorum edidit Josephus Koch. Monasterii: Aschendorff, 1929.
- De Iurisdictione ein unveröffentlichter Traktat des Herveus Natalis OP über die kirchengewalt von Ludwig Hödl. München: Max Hueber, 1959.
- Magistri D. Durandi a Sancto Porciano Ordinis praedicatorum Quolibeta avenionensia tria Durandus a Sancto Porciano; additis Correctionibus Hervei Natalis supra dicta Durandi in primo quodlibet; cura P. T. Stella. Zürich: Pas, 1965.
- Hervei Natalis Britonis In quatuor Libros sententiarum Commentaria quibus adiectus est eiusdem auctoris Tractatus de potestate Papae. Farnborough Hants: Gregg Press, 1966 (Facsimile reprint of the edition: Parisiis, apud viduam Dyonisii Moreau & Dyonisium Moreau filium, 1647.
- Quodlibeta Hervei subtilissima Hervei Natalis Britonis theologi acutissimi quodlibeta undecim cum octo ipsius profundissimis tractatibus ... nunc primum impressa ... Ridgewood, NJ: Gregg, 1966 (Facsimile reprint of the edition: Venetiis, per Georgium Arrivabenum, 1513.
- Harvey of Nedellec's proofs for the existence of God: de cognitione primi principii, QQ.III-IV Edited by Joseph T. Mannath, Rome, Pontificium Athenaeus Salesianum, (Excerpt from a Ph. D. thesis) 1969.
- The poverty of Christ and the apostles Hervaeus Natalis; a translation, with introduction and notes, of the Liber de paupertate Christi et apostolorum by John D. Jones Toronto: Pontifical Institute of Mediaeval Studies, 1999.
- A Treatise of Master Hervaeus Natalis (d.1323) The Doctor Perspicacissimus On Second Intentions Milwaukee: Marquette University Press 2008. Volume One - An English translation and Volume Two - A Latin edition by John P. Doyle.
- Hervaeus Natalis. De Quattuor Materiis, Sive Determinationes Contra Magistrum Henricum De Gandavo. Edited by L. M. de Rijk. Vol. I: De formis (together with his De unitate formae substantialis in eodem suppositio), Turnhout: Brepols, 2011; Vol. II: De esse et essentia. De materia et forma. A Critical Edition from Selected Manuscripts, Turnhout: Brepols, 2013; Vol. III: (in preparation).

Preceded by Bérengar de Landore	Master General of the Dominican Order; 1318–1323	Succeeded by Barnaba Cagnoli
