= Thomas of Strasbourg =

Augustine friar

Thomas of Strasbourg OSA (also known as Thomas de Argentina; c. 1275 – c. 1357) was a fourteenth-century scholastic philosopher.

== Biography ==
Thomas entered the Augustinian Order at Haguenau and taught at Strasbourg for several years. About the year 1337 he went to Paris, where he obtained his doctorate in theology and became famous as a teacher in the university. In 1345 he was elected general of the Augustinian Order, a position he would hold for the rest of his life. During his tenure, he promoted religious discipline and revised the constitution of his order. During his generalate, the teachings of William of Ockham were condemned by general chapters of the Augustinians in 1345 and 1348.

== Thought ==
Thomas interested himself in the promotion of study among the members of his order, and was instrumental in founding at Verona in 1351 a studium generale, or university, for the study of logic, philosophy, and theology. His best known work is a commentary on the Books of Sentences of Peter Lombard, published at Strasbourg in 1490 (other editions: Venice, 1564 and 1588; Genoa, 1585; Geneva, 1635). He was also the author of sermons, meditations, and letters, still unpublished.

As a teacher and commentator he adhered closely to the doctrines of Giles of Rome, who since 1287 had been recognized as the doctor ordinis of the Augustinians. He opposed the innovations of Henry of Ghent and the abstruse distinctions of the Scotists. For example, on the question of the distinction between the nature of God and the Divine attributes, he taught that there can be no formal distinction, nor any distinction of any kind except by comparison of the external effects of those attributes. Similarly there is, he maintained, no formal distinction between God and the Divine ideas; whatever distinction exists among the ideas themselves or between the ideas and the Divine essence is the work of the Divine intellect. In regard to the origin of the universe, he maintained that the doctrine of creation can be proved by strict demonstrations, the starting-point of the proof being the fact that the power of God, being unlimited, could not postulate a material as a necessary condition of action: just as the existence of God does not postulate any other being, so the Divine action does not postulate a material on which to act. This refers, however, to creation in general. Whether the material universe was created in time or with time, or, on the contrary, was created ab aeterno, is a question which, he believed, the human mind cannot solve without the aid of revelation.

== Bibliography ==
- Ossinger, Johann Felix (1768). Bibliotheca augustiniana. Ingolstadt and Vienna: Johann Franz Xaver Crätz. pp. 71, sqq.
- Fabricius, Johann Albert (1858). Bibliotheca latina mediae et infimae aetatis. Vol. V. Florence. pp. 537 sqq.
- Stöckl, Albert (1865). Geschichte der Philosophie des Mittelalters. Vol. II. Mainz. pp. 1045 sqq.
- De Wulf, Maurice (1909). History of mediaeval philosophy. Translated by Peter Coffey. New York. pp. 437, 438, has a paragraph on the Ægidian School.
- Russell, T. P. (2003). "Thomas of Strassburg". New Catholic Encyclopedia. Vol. 14: Thi–Zwi (2nd ed.). Detroit: Thomson Gale. p. 37.
