= Gerard of Siena =

- Born: c. 1295
- Died: 1336

Gerard of Siena (c. 1295 – d. 1336) was a Tuscan student of Giles of Rome at the University of Paris who opposed usury. He lectured on Peter Lombard's Sentences.
