= Prosper of Reggio Emilia (theologian) =

Rubric identifying the start of Prosper's commentary in Vat. lat. 1086

Prosper of Reggio Emilia (died 1332/1333) was an Augustinian hermit and scholar.

Prosper was born in the 1270s. He was sent by his order to study theology at the University of Paris. He served the order as a lector at Milan before returning to Paris to complete his studies. He became a Master of Theology in March 1316. In 1318, he was appointed examiner of the Augustinian schools in Italy. By 1321, he was the regent of the Augustinian studium generale in Bologna, where he taught until his death in 1332 or 1333.

Prosper's notebook survives in the Vatican Library, where it has been bound together with his extensive but incomplete commentary on the Sentences as Vat. lat. 1086. Marginal notes were added later in the 14th century. A citation of his commentary is also found in Thomas of Strasbourg's commentary. His notebook contains reports (reportationes) of various quodlibeta, including his own.

Like Durand of Saint-Pourçain, Prosper attacked the then reigning theory of cognitive habits. Rather than see such habits as entities in the intellect, he views them as products of the "imaginative" or "ostensive" power of the soul to "show" things to the intellect.

== Bibliography ==
- Courtenay, William J. (2007). "Reflections on Vat. Lat. 1086 and Prosper of Reggio Emilia, O.E.S.A.". In Christopher Schabel (ed.). Theological Quodlibeta in the Middle Ages: The Fourteenth Century. Brill. pp. 345–357.
- Hartman, Peter John (2018). "Are Cognitive Habits in the Intellect? Durand of St.-Pourçain and Prosper de Reggio Emilia on Cognitive Habits". In Nicolas Faucher; Magali Roques (eds.). The Ontology, Psychology and Axiology of Habits (Habitus) in Medieval Philosophy. Springer. pp. 229–244.
- Pelzer, Auguste (1928). "Prosper de Reggio Emilia, des Ermites de Saint-Augustin, et le manuscrit latin 1086 de la Bibliothèque Vaticane". Revue Philosophique de Louvain. 2nd. 30 (19): 316–351.
- Schabel, Christopher; Courtenay, William J. (2007). "Augustinian Quodlibeta After Giles of Rome". In Christopher Schabel (ed.). Theological Quodlibeta in the Middle Ages: The Fourteenth Century. Brill. pp. 545–568.
