= Peter of Atarrabia =

Peter of Atarrabia (d. ?1347), also called Peter of Navarre, was a Franciscan administrator and theologian.

Peter's early life is poorly known. He took his name from Atarrabia in Navarre. He may have studied at the University of Paris under John Duns Scotus. From 1317, he served the Franciscan provincial minister of Aragon. In 1325, he was a professor of sacred theology, probably lecturing in Barcelona. In 1328, he travelled to Paris as an envoy from Queen Joan II of Navarre. A document related to this mission confirms that he was a master of theology. For his services, King Philip III of Navarre granted him a pension at the end of 1329. Records show that it was paid through 1346, which suggests that he died in 1347.

Peter wrote a commentary on the first book of Peter Lombard's Sentences. He refers in that work to his quodlibet, a record of the question-and-answer sessions he held probably at Barcelona. Several questions found in a manuscript in the Vatican Library (Vat. lat. 1012) have been identified as his, deriving from both his referenced quodlibet and another, later one.

== Bibliography ==
- Azanza, A. (1995). "La polémica de Pedro de Atarrabia (m. 1347) con Pedro Auréolo (m. 1322) sobre la intuición del no-existente". Revista Española de Filosofía Medieval. 2: 71–78. doi:10.21071/refime.v2i.9744. hdl:10396/22065.
- Duba, William O. (2007). "Continental Franciscan Quodlibeta after Scotus". In Christopher Schabel (ed.). Theological Quodlibeta in the Middle Ages: The Fourteenth Century. Brill. pp. 569–650.
- Sagüés Azcona, Pío (1974). Doctoris fundati Petri de Atarrabia sive De Navarra, OFM in Primum Sententiarum Scriptum. Madrid.
