= Henry of Harclay =

English philosopher and university chancellor

Henry Harclay
- Born: c. 1270; Carlisle, Cumberland
- Died: 25 June 1317 (aged 46–47); Avignon

Education
- Education: University of Paris

Philosophical work
- Era: Medieval philosophy
- Region: Western philosophy
- School: Scholasticism (Scotism)
- Main interests: Theology, metaphysics
- Notable ideas: The necessity of univocal concepts in theology

Henry (of) Harclay (Latin: Henricus Harcleius, also Harcla or Harcley; c. 1270 – 25 June 1317) was an English medieval philosopher and university chancellor.

== Biography ==
Harclay was born in the Diocese of Carlisle near the English and Scottish borders. Harclay's family descended from "an old but minor knightly family" of modest origins that gave them their surname Harclay from Hartley; the family name had "considerable variation in the spelling… including: Herkeley, Harkeley, Archilay, Harcla, [etc.]" (Harclay xvii). Harclay had one sister and six brothers; one of which also brings celebrity to the family name. Andrew Harclay, 1st Earl of Carlisle was a controversial figure in his time and was also known for his political and military accomplishments during the Anglo-Scottish wars in the early 14th century. Harclay's father Michael was a sheriff in the county of Cumberland between 1285 and 1298 (Harclay xvii).

Harclay became a Master of the Arts at the University of Oxford by the time he was twenty-six (Pasnau 882). In that same year of 1296, the Bishop of Carlisle appointed him to be the Rector of the church at Dacre on Christmas Day. He remained a secular theologian until 1297 when he was ordained as a priest. (Harclay xviii). Shortly after these events, Henry of Harclay left to study theology at the University of Paris. The dates for Harclay's studies at the University of Paris are most likely between 1300 and 1310 (Harclay xix). Henry went back to Oxford where he became a Master of Theology sometime before 1312 (Pasnau 882).

Henry of Harclay was also declared Chancellor of the University of Oxford in 1312, a position he held until his death in 1317. It is believed that during this period William of Ockham studied under Harclay.

The Bishop of Lincoln, John Dalderby, confirmed Henry of Harclay as the Chancellor of the University of Oxford. Harclay was very active and devotedly attentive towards "maintaining the order of the university" (M.G. Henninger 305). A highly contentious and bitter controversy arose during his tenure as chancellor between him and the Dominicans over the confirmation of certain privileges accorded to the university by the king. These included King Edward II’s decree that the mayor of Oxford "admit the chancellor and procurators of the university to the periodic testing of beer" (M.G. Henninger 305). These controversies sparked Henry's travelling to the papal court in Avignon several times to defend the universities privileges, and to reach an agreement with the Dominicans. Harclay died on one of these trips in Avignon on 25 June 1317 (M.G. Henninger 305).

Harclay played an important role in Oxford and Paris during the first two decades of the 14th century. While in Paris, he produced a commentary on book I of the Sentences of Peter Lombard, and perhaps a reportatio of lectures from around 1300. Harclay's "principle work is a wide-ranging, philosophically rich series of twenty-nine Quaestiones ordinariae" or Ordinary Questions (Pasnau, 882). Harclay's commentary on the Sentences has only been edited very partially as of now, and so most of what we know about his philosophical beliefs will come from his Ordinary Questions (Harclay xxii).

== Philosophy ==
=== Influences ===
At the University of Paris, Henry of Harclay studied theology under the philosopher John Duns Scotus, who strongly influenced Harclay's works. This influence is especially prevalent in Harclay's commentary on Peter Lombard's Sentences, where he "frequently uses Scotus's arguments and adopts many of his positions" (M.G. Henninger 305). Henninger points out however, that Henry was not just riding his mentor's coat tails but "offered independent criticisms which may have influenced Scotus's final edition of his own commentary" (M.G. Henninger 305). Questions concerning the eternity of the world were prevalent in philosophical discussion dating back to the thirteenth century, so it is not surprising that Henry of Harclay was influenced by these discussions and: "[W]as much occupied in his writing with the problem of the possible eternity of the world and with the properties of the infinite" (Dales 297).

=== Principal ideas ===
Harclay's most popular, and at the time of his writing, controversial, claims are those that concern ideas about the eternity of the world and the infinite, and the univocal concept of being. He attacked basic assumptions of those who argued the eternity of the world was impossible and that "all infinites are equal" (Dales 298). Harclay addresses these issues in Ordinary Questions XVIII and asks, "Could the world have existed from all eternity?" (Harclay 735). He presents three opposing theories, and supports the one that claims "the world and movement could have existed from all eternity" and states that "God [has] the power to do anything that is known not to include a contradiction or that is not known to include [one]" (Harclay 753).

Harclay's argument for the univocal concept of being seeks to answer two questions: “whether there is anything univocally common between God and his creatures…and [whether the same is true] concerning substance and accident" (M. Henninger 206).

On the infinite and the eternity of the world

Harclay addresses arguments against this such as that infinite time creates infinite souls and therefore infinite power (equal or greater than God's), and that greater and lesser infinites would ensue (Dales 298–299). He refutes the first by claiming: "An infinity of multitude is not inconsistent with souls, although an infinity of power would be…for all these souls taken together will not make one infinite power…therefore, [these] infinite souls do not constitute some species of number, but a multitude of infinite numbers…for it is a contradiction that one number contain every number…for then it would contain itself, which is impossible" (Harclay 757). Harclay believes he shows the possibility of greater and lesser infinites by referencing the revolutions of planets, and that "the quantity of four feet is not divisible into as many infinite parts of the same quantity of eight feet" (Harclay 769). These quantities are infinitely divisible, yet one would have "more parts of the same quantity in the double quantity…even if we carry on [dividing] to infinity" (Harclay 769).

=== On the univocal concept of being ===
Harclay believes it is necessary for there to be univocal concepts for it to be possible to make inquiries into God's nature. If things such as the definition of what it means to exist is equivocal between God and his creatures, then when we say "God exists" really we are just saying "God is God" so we have not proven anything and consequently are prevented from knowing anything about God (Harclay 461). Harclay continues until he reaches the conclusion that: [W]hatever formally pertains to God and to creatures is not ascribed equivocally, since comparison can be made [only] according to something common. (M. Henninger 215).

As for substance and accidents, he says that univocal commonality is also present because this unity of relation is not a being (either substance or accident) but a concept. This is because if there is not a difference between "the concept of being predicated of a substance, and the concept of a substance" it would be impossible for anyone to distinguish between an accident of a substance and the substance itself (M. Henninger 215).

== Bibliography ==
Primary sources

- Henry of Harclay. Ordinary Questions, І-XIV. Edited by Mark G Henninger and translated by Raymond Edwards & Mark G. Henninger. Oxford, OUP/British Academy, 2008 (Auctores Britannici Medii Aevi XVIII), 738 pp.
- Henry of Harclay. Ordinary Questions, XV-XXIX. Edited by Mark G Henninger and translated by Raymond Edwards & Mark G. Henninger. Oxford, OUP/British Academy, 2008 (Auctores Britannici Medii Aevi XVIII), 492 pp.
- Gal, Gedeon. Henricus de Harclay: Quaestio de significato conceptus universalis, Franciscan Studies (1971) 31:178-234.
- Henninger, Mark G. Henry of Harclay’s questions on divine prescience and predestination, Franciscan Studies (1980) 40:167-243.
- Henninger, Mark G. Henry of Harclay on the formal distinction in the Trinity, Franciscan Studies (1981) 41:250-335.
- Henninger, Mark G. Henry of Harclay’s question on relations, Mediaeval Studies, (1987) 49:76-123.
- Maurer, Armand. Henry of Harclay’s questions on immortality, Mediaeval Studies (1957) 19:79-107.
- Maurer, Armand. Henry of Harclay’s disputed question on the plurality of forms, in: J.R. O’Donnell (ed.), Essays in Honor of Anton Pegis, Toronto: Pontifical Institute of Mediaeval Studies, 1974, pp. 125–159.

Secondary sources

- Dales, Richard C. "Henry of Harclay on the Infinite." Journal of the History of Ideas, Vol. 45, No. 2. (1984): pp. 295–301.
- Henninger, Mark. “Henry of Harclay and the Univocal Concept of Being.” Medieval Studies, Vol. 68 (2006): pp. 205–237.
- Henninger, Mark G. “Henry of Harclay.” A Companion to Philosophy in the Middle Ages. Ed. Jorge J. E. Gracia and Timothy B. Noone. Malden: Blackwell, 2003.
- Henninger, Mark G. 'Harclay, Henry (c.1270–1317)', Oxford Dictionary of National Biography, Oxford University Press, 2004 (accessed 13 November 2007).
- Pasnau, Robert. The Cambridge History of Medieval Philosophy. Cambridge: Cambridge University Press Cambridge University Press, 2010.
- Schabel, Chris. "Aufredo Gonteri Brito secundum Henry of Harclay on Divine Foreknowledge and Future Contingents," in: Constructions of Time in the Late Middle Ages. Ed. Carol Poster and Richard Utz. Evanston, IL: Northwestern University Press, 1997. Pp. 159–195.

Academic offices
Preceded by Henry de Maunsfeld	Chancellor of the University of Oxford; 1313–1316	Succeeded by Richard de Nottingham? or John Lutterell
