= Godfrey of Fontaines =

Belgian scholastic philosopher and theologian

Godfrey of Fontaines (Latin: Godefridus de Fontibus, born sometime before 1250, died 29 October 1306 or 1309), was a scholastic philosopher and theologian who was designated by the title Doctor Venerandus. He made contributions to a diverse range of subjects ranging from moral philosophy to epistemology. However, he is best known today for his work on metaphysics.

== Early life ==
Godfrey was born sometime before 1250 in the Principality of Liège, in present-day Belgium. He was likely born at Fontaines-les-Hozémont, a château owned by his noble family.

== Studies ==
Godfrey was a student at the University of Paris by at least 1277, but more probably as early as 1270, as he was likely there during the second regency of Thomas Aquinas (1269–1272) who had returned to Paris from the Santa Sabina studium provinciale. Aquinas' teaching was perhaps the strongest influence on Godfrey's own thought, though he differed on issues such as the principle of individuation, and the distinction between essence and existence in material things. A notebook from his student years has been dated around 1271 to 1274 demonstrating his familiarity with views proposed by Siger of Brabant and Boethius of Dacia, leading representatives of the radical Aristotelian movement in the Arts faculty at the time.

== Career ==
He was a "Magister", or Master of Theology, at the University of Paris by at least 1285 because that is when he gave his first Quodlibet, which means he had earned his Magister regens in theology and because he would have to be at least 35for the honour, which offers the reasoning that his year of birth is 1250 or earlier. He was Magister regens from 1285 to 1299 and then again in 1303 to 1304. Godfrey was held in high esteem during his life, and held a number of ecclesiastical offices, including Canon of Liège, Canon of Tournai, Provost of St. Severin in Cologne (1287–1295), and possibly Canon of Paris. In 1300 he was chosen to be the Bishop of Tournai, but he chose not to take the position because of a contested election. Godfrey left Paris between his final Quodlibet in 1298-1299 and 1303/1304 yet returned before he died on 29 October 1306 or 1309. He had compiled a large library during his lifetime, which he donated to the Sorbonne upon his death; a portion of it is still intact.

== Writings ==
The most significant of Godfrey's writings are transcriptions of Quodlibets of which he participated in 15 during his tenure at the University of Paris. These were week-long sessions held before Christmas and Easter in which participating Masters were required to answer questions chosen by their students. This was taxing to the Master, who would have to argue a thoughtful and researched answer on an incredibly diverse range of subjects. Many Masters chose not to engage in the Quodlibets. Godfrey of Fontaines completed at least 15 Quodlibetal sessions. Hence, Godfrey discussed a very wide range of issues. These and other writings show him to have been not merely a distinguished theologian and philosopher but also a canonist, jurist, moralist and conversationalist, who took an active part in the various ecclesiastical, doctrinal, and disciplinary disputes that stirred Paris during period.

Godfrey was reportedly influenced by Thomas Aquinas and was a defender of Thomism against his contemporaries. Thomism was a novel theory at the time, and was condemned by Étienne Tempier, Bishop of Paris (Condemnation of 1277), and opposed by John Peckham and many others. This is despite Godfrey attacking the mendicant orders throughout his career, whereas Aquinas was a member of the Dominican mendicant order. Wippel says Godfrey opposed the mendicant orders because of the belief that "those who had confessed to mendicants by reason of the privileges granted to the latter by Pope Martin's bull were still bound to confess the same sins once again to their own priests."

One of Godfrey's largest contributions was to the field of metaphysics. He was opposed to Platonic arguments advanced from his contemporaries, such as Henry of Ghent. For example, he argued against the concept of Platonic ideal forms and that something's essential substance and existence were one and the same. His philosophy was strongly influenced by Aristotle.

In the Quodlibetal VIII, Godfrey argues against the Franciscan Christian order and lays an early groundwork of political philosophy where he discusses the ideas of natural rights. Godfrey believed that natural law was dependent on individual self-preservation rather than a religious obligation; he says that “because by natural law each person is obliged to maintain his life…each person has dominion and a certain right in the common exterior goods of this world, a right that he cannot licitly renounce” according to the author Jussi Varkemaa as noted in Conrad Summenhart's Theory of Individual Rights. Godfrey objects that the fundamental Franciscan approach to rights is illicit to human activity and natural rights. He says later that everyone has a right to subsistence, a right that they can never renounce. That applies to the mendicant orders because it applies to all members of society.

Stephen D. Dumont quotes Godfrey in the book Philosophical Debates at Paris in the Early 14th Century: " “Medieval sources are nearly unanimous in identifying Godfrey as a prominent source for the unusual but very influential account of intention and remission known as the "succession of forms". As explained by Dumont, the intension and the remission of forms concern the problem of a change of degree within a given kind of quality like the shading of a color, adjustment of heat or even the altering of moral or cognitive habits. Godfrey held the position that all specific forms are "in their nature indivisible, invariable, and lacking in degrees" (43) and "the specific form of a quality in itself does not undergo any intension or remission but does so insofar as it is individuated in a subject". That line of thought differs drastically from other thinkers around then like Thomas Aquinas and Henry of Ghent, who held that there was a variation of specific forms which are divisible extensions. Godfrey refutes their claims through the reasoning that because qualities cannot change in degree because they are indivisible, they must change insofar as they are individuals, so he concludes that a “change in degree in an individual quality will also be a change of the individual itself, even when its species remains the same”.

Nine other noteworthy topics that Godfrey wrote about in the Quodlibetal are the subject of metaphysics, the division of being, the analogy of being, transcendentals, essence and existence, the knowledge of God's existence and essence, the eternity of the world, substance and accidents, and abstraction.

== Influence ==
Godfrey's XIV Quodlibeta were extensively studied and multiplied in manuscript form in the medieval schools but were published for the first time only in the early 20th century. A critical edition of the first four of them appeared in the series "Les Philosophes Belges, Textes et Études" (II, "Les quatre premiers Quodlibets de Godefroid de Fontaines", by de Wulf and Pelzer, Louvain, 1904).

Sometime in the 14th century, Godfrey, though well known in his own time, fell out of favour into nearly total obscurity. Thomas Aquinas sparked plenty of controversy and discussion in philosophy and theology in the last quarter-century of the 13th century. Many significant writers lived during this period, but for the most part until the 20th century, only Thomas Aquinas and Duns Scotus received any recognition. Godfrey may have been just as significant in his own time as both, yet for some reason, his works were edited and published only in the early 20th century. That may have more to do with his political affiliation than anything else. Religious scholars of the time became well known in the long run based mainly on how well promoted they were by the mendicant orders. Thomas Aquinas was promoted by the Dominican Order, and Duns Scotus was promoted by the Franciscan Order. However, Godfrey' writings had by the 1960s regained much popularity.

== Sources ==
- Wippel, John. Godfrey of Fontaines, The Stanford Encyclopedia of Philosophy (Fall 2001 Edition).
- Bernd Goebel (2010). "Godfrey of Fontaines". In Bautz, Traugott (ed.). Biographisch-Bibliographisches Kirchenlexikon (BBKL) (in German). Vol. 31. Nordhausen: Bautz. ISBN 978-3-88309-544-8.
