= Peter Paludanus =

French theologian and archbishop

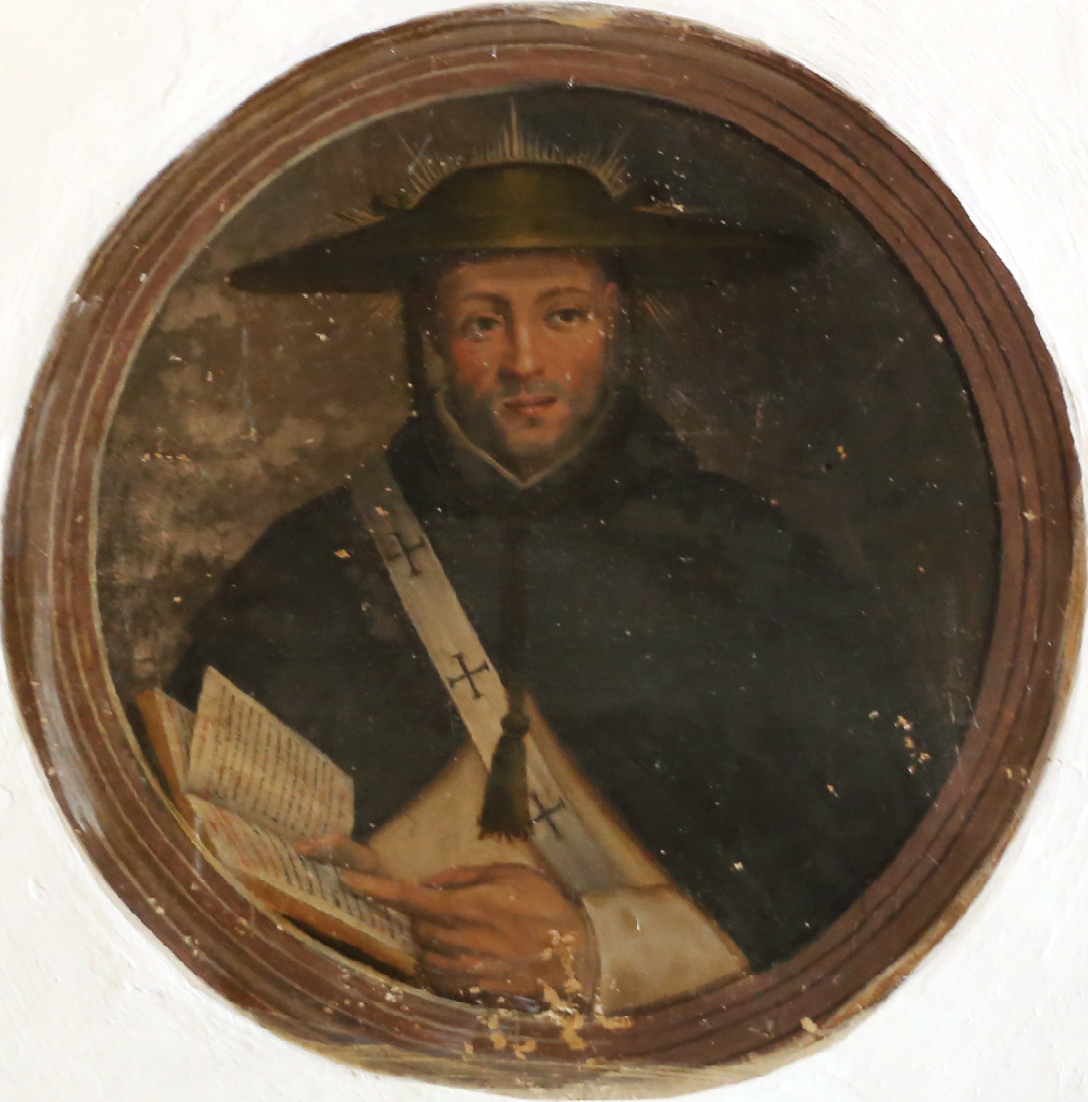
Peter Paludanus

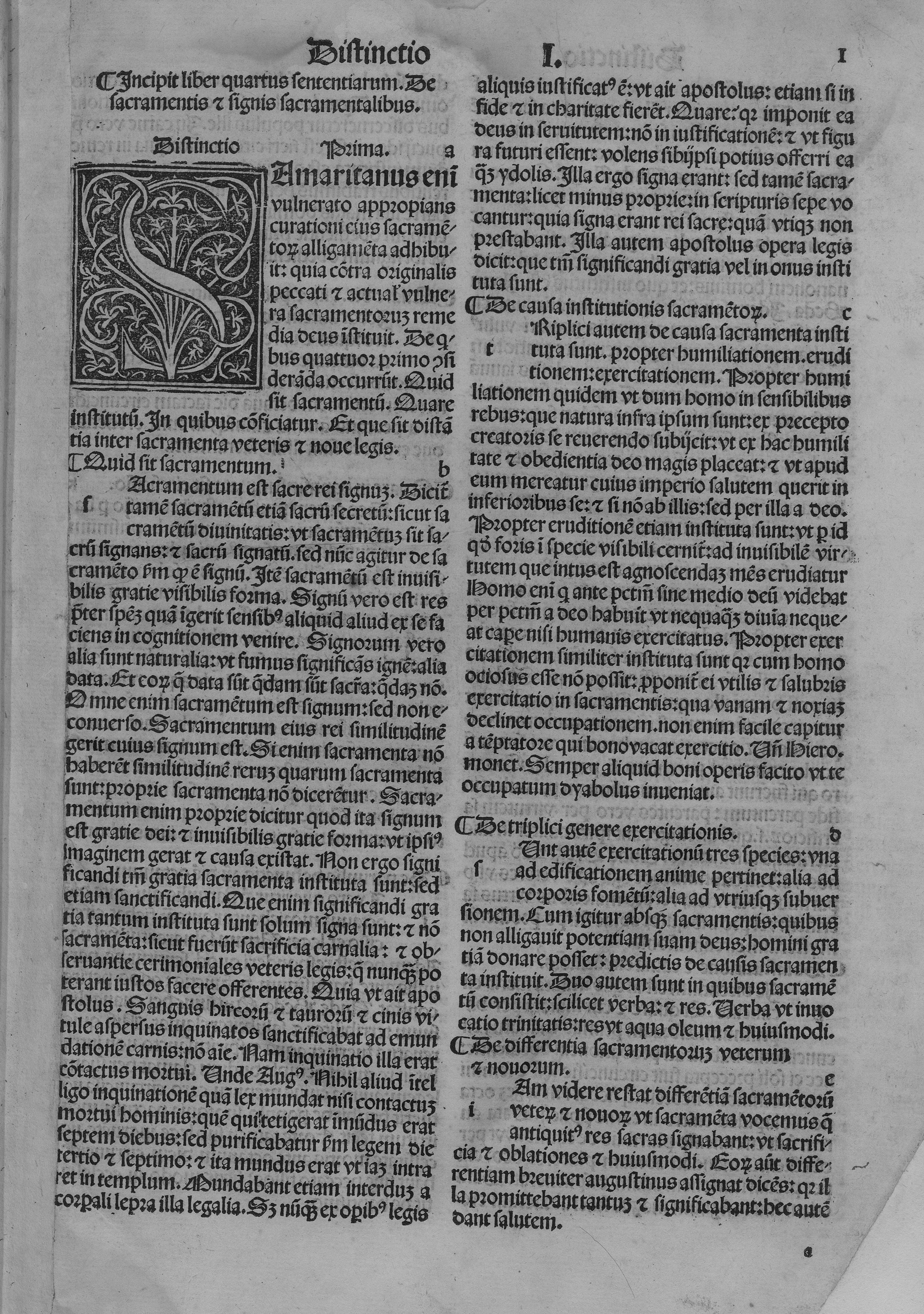
In quartum sententiarum

Peter Paludanus (Petrus de Palude; c. 1275–1342) was a French theologian and archbishop.

== Biography ==
Paludanus was born in the County of Bresse, Savoy, around 1275. He entered the Dominican Order at Lyon, completed his theological studies at the University of Paris, and was made a Doctor and Master of Theology in 1314. Wishing to devote his life to teaching and writing, he avoided all offices of honour in the order, except those pertaining to the direction of studies.

Twice, however, he was sent as definitor from the Province of France to the General Chapter. Pope John XXII, wishing to organize a Crusade, sent him in 1318 as legate to the Count of Flanders, in the hope of establishing peace between the prince and the King of France. The mission was not successful, and his associates made charges to the Pope against the legate, who, however, easily cleared himself. He was also a member of the commission appointed by John XXII to examine the writings of Petrus Olivi, whose books contained some errors of the Fraticelli. The Catholic Encyclopedia states that 'About this time he wrote "De causa immediata ecclesiasticæ potestatis" (Paris, 1506) against John of Pouilly, whose errors were condemned 25 July 1321.' Modern scholarship, however, attributes the work to Guillaume de Pierre Godin (e.g. the 1982 edition of this work by William R. McCready). In 1329, the Pope called him to Avignon, and consecrated him Latin Patriarch of Jerusalem.

The same year, he journeyed into Egypt, to negotiate with the Sultan for the deliverance of Palestine. The Sultan was immovable. The accounts which the patriarch gave of the miserable condition of Palestine led to the announcement of another Crusade, but owing to apathy, and dissensions among the Christian princes, the project failed.

Paludanus resumed his studies, composing at this time his commentaries on the Sentences of Peter Lombard, in which he combats Durandus of Saint-Pourçain.

Around 1332, he was appointed by the King of France to preside over the deliberations of a body of prelates and theologians whom Philip had convoked at Versailles to discuss the charge made against John XXII, of asserting that the souls of the just will not be admitted to the beatific vision until after the general judgment. The Patriarch and his associates manifested consummate prudence in dealing with this matter. In a letter to the King, they declared:

- Their entire submission to the Pope's authority, and their filial devotion to his person;
- Their belief, based on the testimony of trustworthy witnesses, that John XXII had not held, much less taught, the opinion attributed to him, but at the most, had mentioned it (recitando) and examined it;
- That since the death of Christ the souls of the just with no faults to expiate immediately after death, and the souls of other just persons after complete purgation, are admitted to the beatific vision, which will endure forever.

This doctrine was defined by Pope Benedict XII on 29 January 1336. Besides the works mentioned, Paludanus wrote commentaries on all the books of the Bible, and "Concordantiæ ad Summam S. Thomæ" (Salamanca, 1552).

== Death ==
Peter Paludanus died at Paris, in his late sixties and was buried at the Couvent des Jacobins.

== Works ==
- In quartum sententiarum (in Latin). Venice: Ottaviano Scoto. 1493.

== See also ==
- James of Lausanne
