= Remigio dei Girolami =

Italian Dominican philosopher (1245–1319)

Remigio Dei Girolami

Remigio dei Girolami (c. 12251245–1319) was an Italian Dominican theologian and philosopher. He was an early pupil of Thomas Aquinas and a contemporary of Dante Alighieri.

== Biography ==
Remigio was born around 1245 into an influential bourgeois family that belonged to the Wool Guild (Arte della Lana) in Florence. His father, Chiaro de' Girolami, was among the Anziani of the Primo Popolo in 1250; his brother Salvi was one of the first priors in 1282; and Salvi’s sons—Chiaro, Girolamo, and Mompuccio—also held the office of prior.

He initially studied the liberal arts in Paris and presumably joined the Dominican Order there in 1267. It is very likely that Thomas Aquinas was one of his teachers. He then returned to Florence and served for over forty years as a lecturer at the monastery of Santa Maria Novella. Later, he was sent back to Paris to continue his studies; he received the magisterium in theology in 1304 from Benedict XI. (According to Charles T. Davis, this occurred as early as 1302 under Boniface VIII.). In addition, he served several times as Definitor at provincial and general chapters, once as prior of his convent, and once as prior of the Roman province. In his later years, poor health forced him to focus on writing.

He died in 1319 and is buried in the Gaddi Chapel of the Church of Santa Maria Novella in Florence.

== Works ==
Remigio Dei Girolami left behind numerous sermons, which have been preserved in several manuscripts at the Biblioteca Nazionale in Florence. In addition, there are treatises on theology, philosophy, politics, and economics. His sermons cover Lenten, seasonal, and feast days, as well as the section titled De diversis materiis, which contains occasional sermons, such as those delivered to welcome distinguished guests. In the final years of his life, he added marginal notes and cross-references to the manuscripts so that they could serve as preaching aids for his fellow monks. He studied a wide range of authors, from Augustine and Aristotle to Cicero and Seneca, as well as Arab authors.

In addition to his theological works, his political thought has been increasingly studied since the 20th century. This trend was spurred by Emilio Panella’s edition of his writings. These works were composed during the Florentine factional strife between the Ghibellines and the Guelphs—and later between the White and Black Guelphs—and the exile of many citizens, including Dante and Remigio’s nephews. In De bono communi (1302) and De bono pacis (1304), he identifies the common good with the welfare of the commune and places it above the welfare of the individual. The citizen, he argues, is part of a whole, outside of which he does not truly exist. His argument “Si non est civis non est homo” (Latin for “If he is not a citizen, he is not a human being.”) is often quoted. In this, he significantly sharpens the thinking of Aristotle and Thomas Aquinas of human beings as Zoon politikon (Greek for “social being”).

In The Two Bodies of the King, medievalist Ernst Kantorowicz describes Remigio as an “extreme anti-individualist.” Recent research considers this accusation to be ahistorical; however, Remigio’s argument is deemed inconsistent because he treats the commune as both an integral and a universal whole. Historically speaking, his thinking provided a justification for communal self-assertion and for the ideal of the bonum commune (Latin for “common good”) as the standard for political action. In this respect, he is regarded as an important witness to the transition from politics framed purely in theological terms to a more independent theory of civic community. He was able to adapt the political thought of Aquinas, which emphasized monarchy, to the communal regimes of Italy.

Two of his works, the Divisio scientie and Contra falsos ecclesie professores, discuss music. He thought the church represented all human sciences, including the musical sciences that formed part of the quadrivium. The musical element (modulatio) of these sciences referred to liturgical chants, preaching, and church order.

It is not considered certain that his contemporary Dante Alighieri was a student of Remigio. It is, however, possible that Dante became acquainted with the teachings of Thomas Aquinas through him.

== List of works ==
- De bono communi, De bono pacis, and Sermones della pace
- Contra falsos ecclesie professores
- De peccato usure
- Divisio scientie
- Quodlibets
