= William de la Mare =

English Franciscan theologian

William de La Mare (fl. 1272–1279) was an English Franciscan theologian.

== Biography ==
William de la Mare's origins are unknown. He obtained a master's degree (Master Regent) in Paris in 1274/5. In Paris, he came under the influence of Bonaventura and Roger Bacon. He returned to England, and is known to have preached in Lincoln.

In 1310, de la Mare was classed with Bonaventura, John Peckham, and others among the "solemn masters" of the order.

== Works ==
De la Mare wrote scholarly notes relating to biblical texts, including textual notes (his Correctio textus bibliae), a linguistic references for the Hebrew used in original version of biblical scripture (the De hebraeis et graecis vocabilis glossarum bibliae).

In the period 1277–9, de la Mare composed a work on Thomas Aquinas, the Correctorium, or Reprehensorium. In 1282, the Franciscan order adopted the 'Correctorium ', critical of Aquinas (of the Dominican Order), and it was prescribed to be read in conjunction with his works. The substance of the Correctorium was later printed (at Strasburg, 1501; Cordova, 1701, and elsewhere) with the reply to it under the name of Ægidius Colonna. De la Mare argues that, as the "principium individuationis" is, according to the Thomists, matter, and not form, individuality, according to them, ceases to exist as soon as the soul leaves the body; in other words, the Dominican school supported the Averroistic heresy of the universal soul.

De la Mare also wrote in favour of a strict observance of the rule of St. Francis. Among his extant works are: Quæstiones de Natura Virtutis, Burney MS. Brit. Library, 358; and Commentaries on the first three books of the Sentences, manuscripts of which are in the Laurentian Library at Florence, formerly in the Franciscan library of Santa Croce.
