= Medieval philosophy =

Philosophy during the medieval period

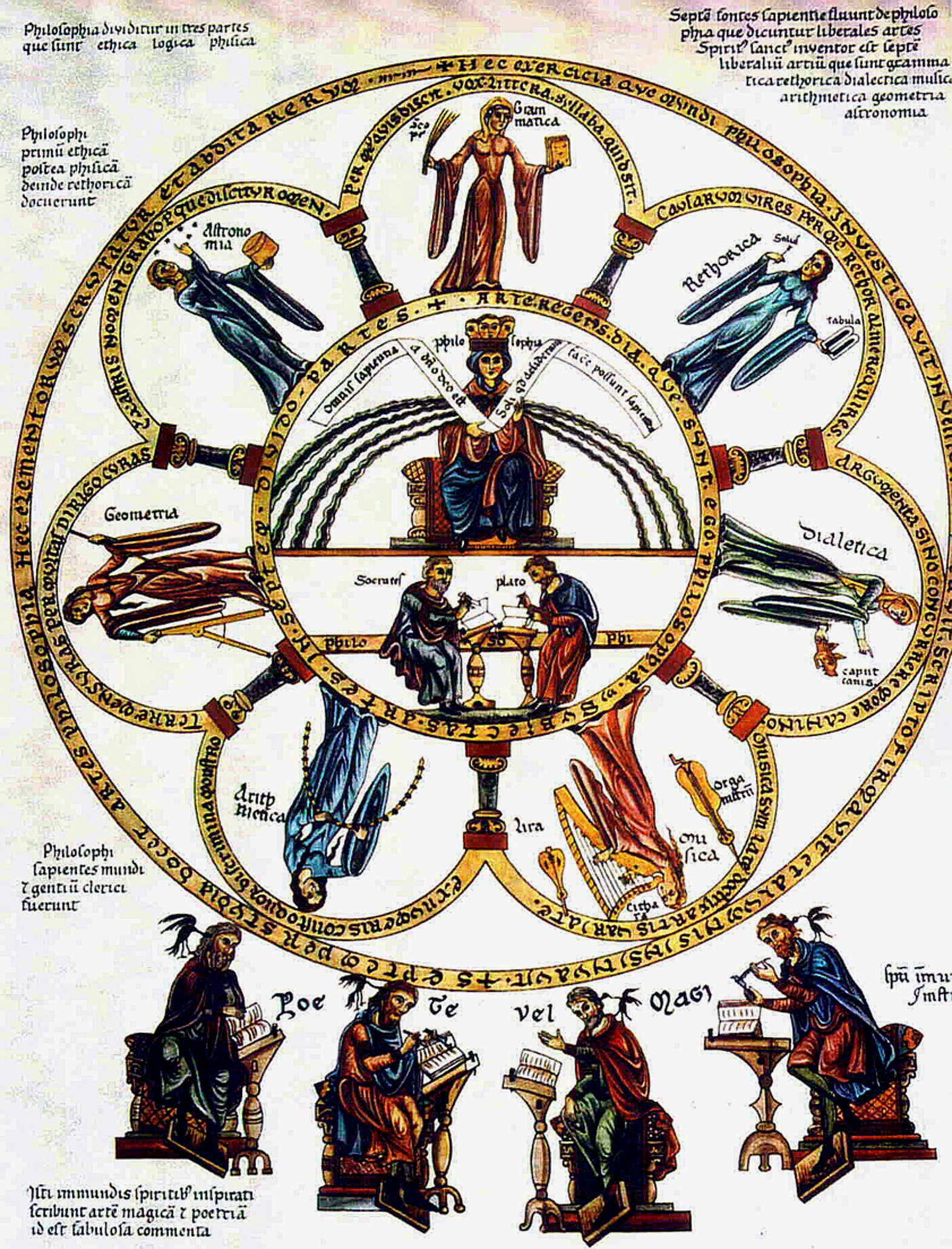
Philosophy seated between the seven liberal arts; 1818 copy of picture from the Hortus deliciarum of Herrad von Landsberg (12th century).

Medieval philosophy is the philosophy that existed through the Middle Ages, the period roughly extending from the fall of the Western Roman Empire in the 5th century until after the Renaissance in the 13th and 14th centuries. Medieval philosophy, understood as a project of independent philosophical inquiry, began in Baghdad, in the middle of the 8th century, and in France and Germany, in the itinerant court of Charlemagne in Aachen, in the last quarter of the 8th century. It is defined partly by the process of rediscovering the ancient culture developed in Greece and Rome during the Classical period, and partly by the need to address theological problems and to integrate sacred doctrine with secular learning. This is one of the defining characteristics in this time period. Understanding God was the focal point of study of the Jewish, Christian and Muslim Philosophers and Theologians.

The history of medieval philosophy is traditionally divided into two main periods: the period in the Latin West following the Early Middle Ages until the 12th century, when the works of Aristotle and Plato were rediscovered, translated, and studied upon, and the "golden age" of the 12th, 13th and 14th centuries in the Latin West, which witnessed the culmination of the recovery of ancient philosophy, along with the reception of its Arabic commentators, and significant developments in the fields of philosophy of religion, logic, and metaphysics.

The high medieval Scholastic period was disparagingly treated by the Renaissance humanists, who saw it as a barbaric "middle period" between the Classical age of Greek and Roman culture, and the rebirth or renaissance of Classical culture. Modern historians consider the medieval era to be one of philosophical development, heavily influenced by Christian theology. One of the most notable thinkers of the era, Thomas of Aquinas, never considered himself a philosopher, and criticized philosophers for always "falling short of the true and proper wisdom".

The problems discussed throughout this period are the relation of faith to reason, the existence and simplicity of God, the purpose of theology and metaphysics, and the problems of knowledge, of universals, and of individuation.

== Characteristics ==
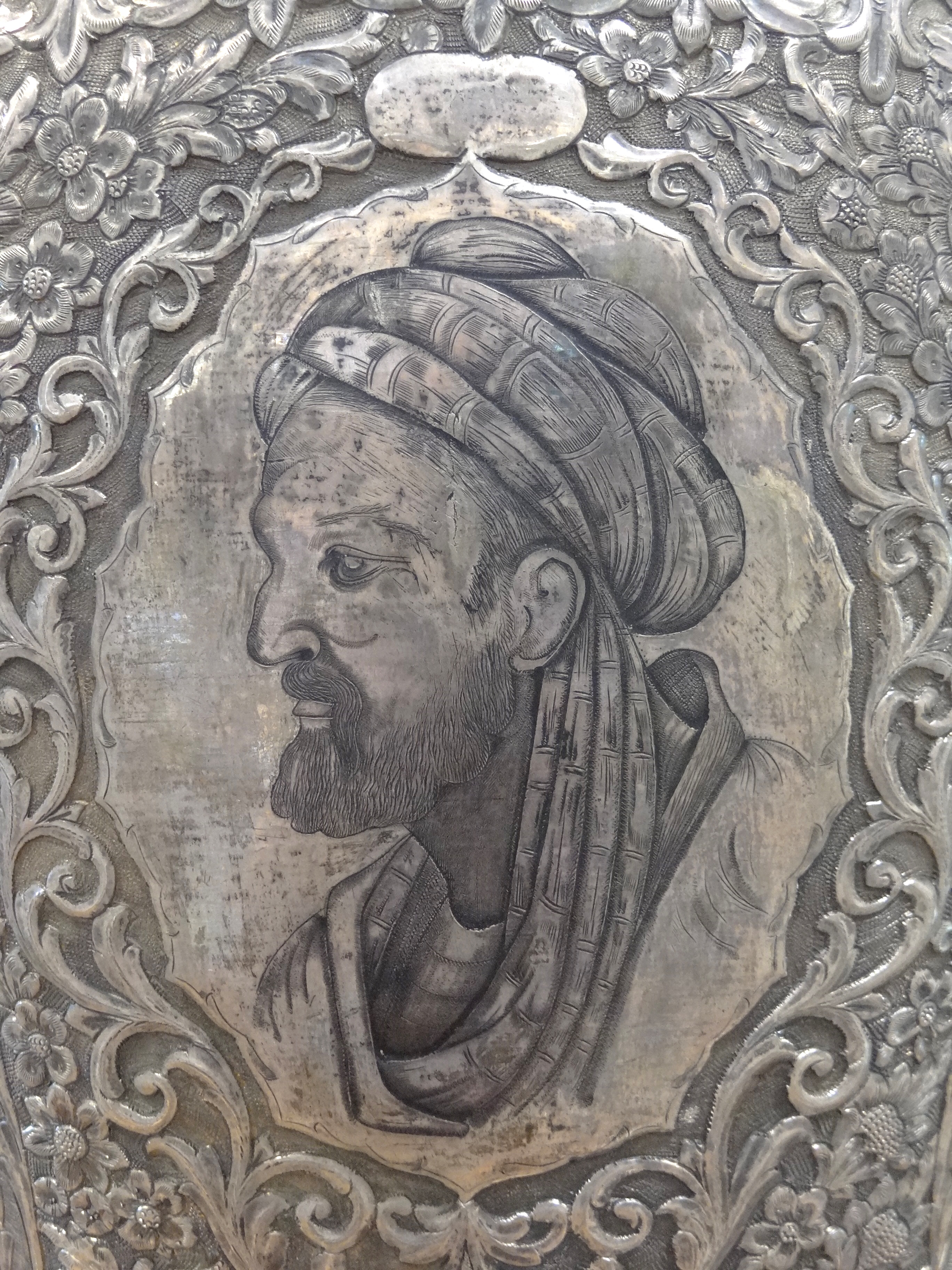
Avicenna

Medieval philosophy places heavy emphasis on the theological. With the possible exceptions of Avicenna and Averroes, medieval thinkers did not consider themselves philosophers at all: for them, the philosophers were the ancient pagan writers such as Plato and Aristotle. However, their theology used the methods and logical techniques of the ancient philosophers to address difficult theological questions and points of doctrine. Thomas Aquinas, following Peter Damian, argued that philosophy is the handmaiden of theology (philosophia ancilla theologiae). Despite this view of philosophy as the servant of theology, this did not prevent the medievals from developing original and innovative philosophies against the backdrop of their theological projects. For instance, such thinkers as Augustine of Hippo and Thomas of Aquinas made monumental breakthroughs in the philosophy of temporality and metaphysics, respectively.

The principles that underlie all the medieval philosophers' work are:

- The use of logic, dialectic, and analysis to discover the truth, known as ratio;
- Respect for the insights of ancient philosophers, in particular Aristotle, and deference to their authority (auctoritas);
- The obligation to co-ordinate the insights of philosophy with theological teaching and revelation (concordia).

One of the most heavily debated issues of the period was that of faith versus reason. Avicenna and Averroes both leaned more on the side of reason. Augustine stated that he would never allow his philosophical investigations to go beyond the authority of God. Anselm attempted to defend against what he saw as partly an assault on faith, with an approach allowing for both faith and reason. The Augustinian solution to the faith/reason problem is to first believe, and then subsequently seek to understand (fides quaerens intellectum). This was the mantra of Christian thinkers, most especially the scholastic philosophers (Albert the Great, Bonaventure, and Thomas Aquinas).

== History ==
=== Early medieval Christian philosophy ===
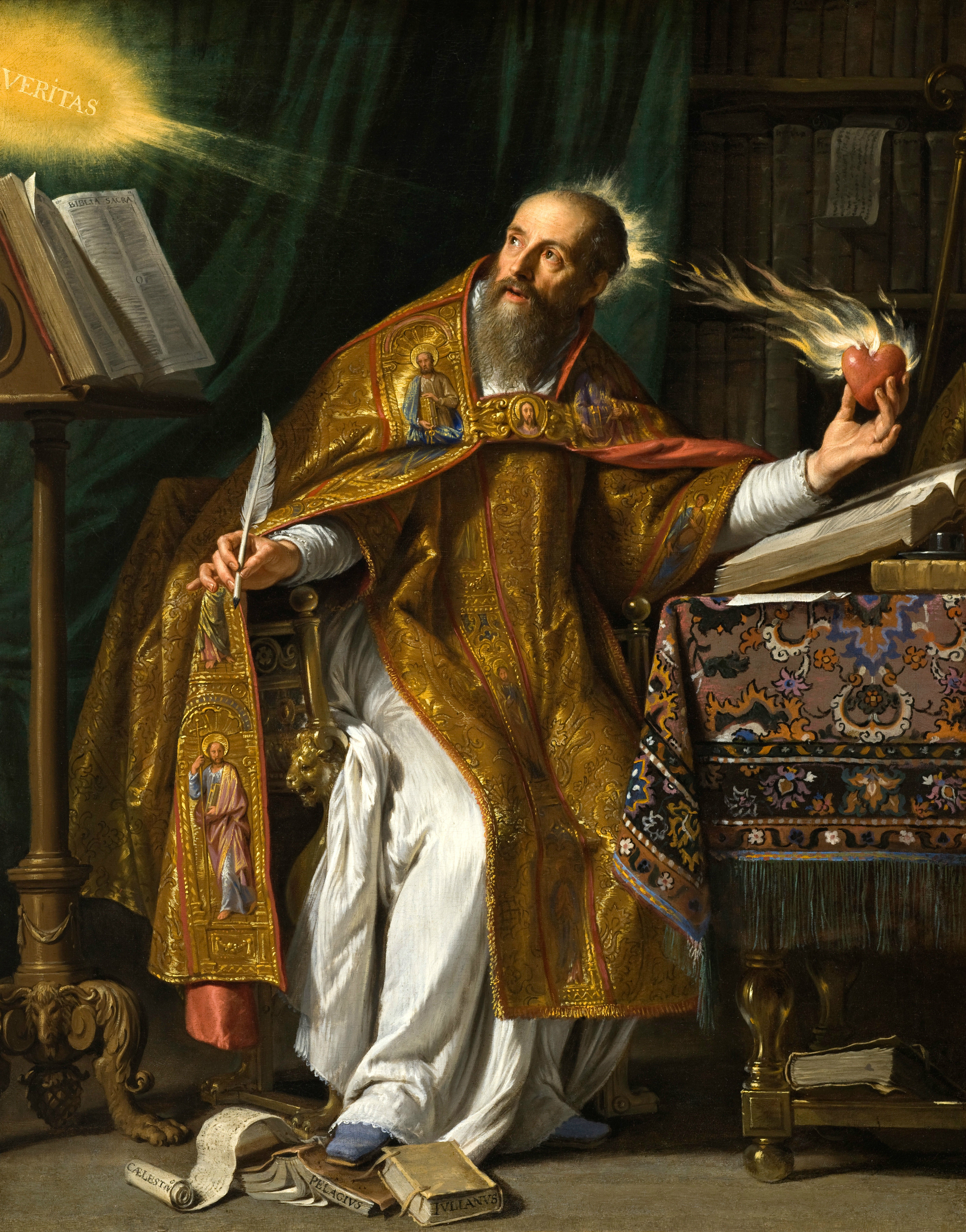
Portrait by Philippe de Champaigne, 17th century

The boundaries of the early medieval period are a matter of controversy. It is generally agreed that it begins with Augustine (354–430) who strictly belongs to the classical period, and ends with the lasting revival of learning in the late eleventh century, at the beginning of the high medieval period.

After the revival of the Roman Empire, Western Europe lapsed into the so-called Dark Ages. Monasteries were among the limited number of focal points of formal academic learning, which might be presumed to be a result of a rule of St Benedict's in 525, which required monks to read the Bible daily, and his suggestion that at the beginning of Lent, a book be given to each monk. In later periods, monks were used for training administrators and churchmen.

Early Christian thought, in particular in the patristic period, tends to be intuitional and mystical, and is less reliant on reason and logical argument. It also places more emphasis on the sometimes-mystical doctrines of Plato, and less upon the systematic thinking of Aristotle. Much of the work of Aristotle was unknown in the West in this period. Scholars relied on translations by Boethius into Latin of Aristotle's Categories, the logical work On Interpretation, and his Latin translation of Porphyry's Isagoge, a commentary on Aristotle's Categories.

Two Roman philosophers had a great influence on the development of medieval philosophy: Augustine and Boethius. Augustine is regarded as the greatest of the Church Fathers. He is primarily a theologian and a devotional writer, but much of his writing is philosophical. His thoughts revolve around on truth, God, the human soul, nature of sin, and salvation. For over a thousand years, there was hardly a Latin work of theology or philosophy that did not quote his writing, or invoke his authority. Some of his writing had an influence on the development of early modern philosophy, such as that of Descartes; Augustine stated that if I err therefore I exist (Si fallor, sum), which anticipated the cogito of Descartes. Anicius Manlius Severinus Boethius (480 c.–524) was a Christian philosopher born in Rome to an ancient and influential family. He became consul in 510 in the kingdom of the Ostrogoths. His influence on the early medieval period was also marked (so much so that it is sometimes called the Boethian period). He intended to translate all the works of Aristotle and Plato from the original Greek into Latin, and translated many of Aristotle's logical works, such as On Interpretation, and the Categories. He wrote commentaries on these works, and on the Isagoge by Porphyry (a commentary on the Categories). This introduced the problem of universals to the medieval world.

The first significant renewal of learning in the West came when Charlemagne, advised by Candidus, Peter of Pisa and Alcuin of York, attracted the scholars of England and Ireland, and by imperial decree in 787 AD established schools in every abbey in his empire. These schools, from which the name Scholasticism is derived, became centres of medieval learning.

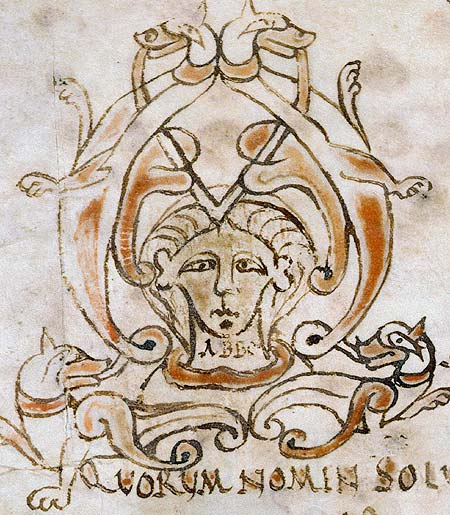
Abbo of Fleury

Johannes Scotus Eriugena (c. 815 – 877), successor of Alcuin of York as head of the Palace School, was an Irish theologian and Neoplatonic philosopher. He is notable for having translated and made commentaries upon the work of Pseudo-Dionysius, initially thought to be from the apostolic age. Around this period several doctrinal controversies emerged, such as the question of whether God had predestined some for salvation and some for damnation. Eriugena was called in to settle this dispute. At the same time, Paschasius Radbertus raised an important question about the real presence of Christ at the Eucharist. Is the host the same as Christ's historical body? How can it be present at many places and many times? Radbertus argued that Christ's real body is present, veiled by the appearance of bread and wine, and is present at all places and all times, by means of God's incomprehensible power.

This period also witnessed a revival of scholarship. At Fleury, Theodulphus, bishop of Orléans, established a school for young noblemen recommended there by Charlemagne. By the mid-ninth century, its library was one of the most comprehensive ever assembled in the West, and scholars such as Lupus of Ferrières (d. 862) traveled there to consult its texts. Later, under St. Abbo of Fleury (abbot 988–1004), head of the reformed abbey school, Fleury enjoyed a second golden age.

Remigius of Auxerre, at the beginning of the tenth century, produced glosses or commentaries on the classical texts of Donatus, Priscian, Boethius, and Martianus Capella. The Carolingian period was followed by a small dark age that was followed by a lasting revival of learning in the eleventh century, which owed much to the rediscovery of Greek thought from Arabic translations and Muslim contributions such as Avicenna's On the soul.

=== High Middle Ages ===
The period from the middle of the eleventh century to the middle of the fourteenth century is known as the 'High medieval' or 'scholastic' period. It is generally agreed to begin with Saint Anselm of Canterbury (1033–1109) an Italian philosopher, theologian, and church official who is famous as the originator of the ontological argument for the existence of God.

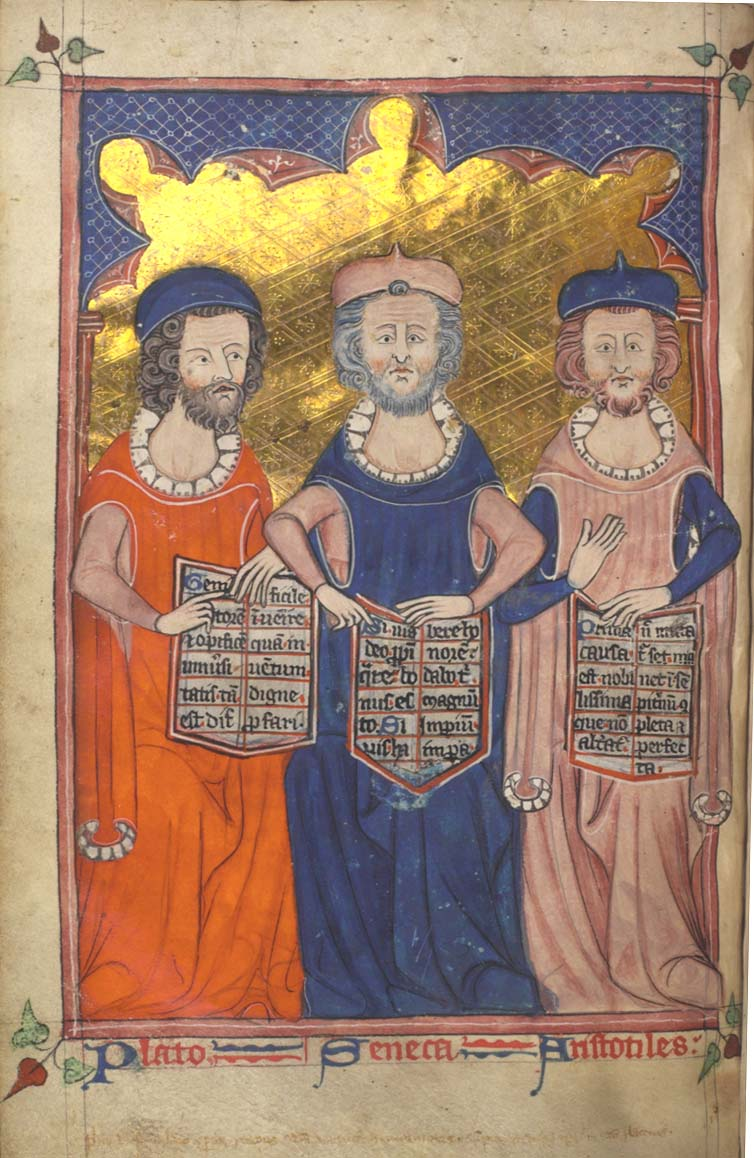
Plato, Seneca, and Aristotle from Devotional and Philosophical Writings, c. 1330

The 13th and early 14th centuries are generally regarded as the high period of scholasticism. The early 13th century witnessed the culmination of the recovery of Greek philosophy. Schools of translation grew up in Italy and Sicily, and eventually in the rest of Europe. Scholars such as Adelard of Bath travelled to Sicily and the Arab world, translating works on astronomy and mathematics, including the first complete translation of Euclid's Elements. Powerful Norman kings gathered men of knowledge from Italy and other areas into their courts as a sign of their prestige. William of Moerbeke's translations and editions of Greek philosophical texts in the middle half of the thirteenth century helped in forming a clearer picture of Greek philosophy, and in particular of Aristotle, than was given by the Arabic versions they had previously relied on, which had distorted or obscured the relation between Platonic and Aristotelian systems of philosophy. Moerbeke's work formed the basis of the major commentaries that followed.

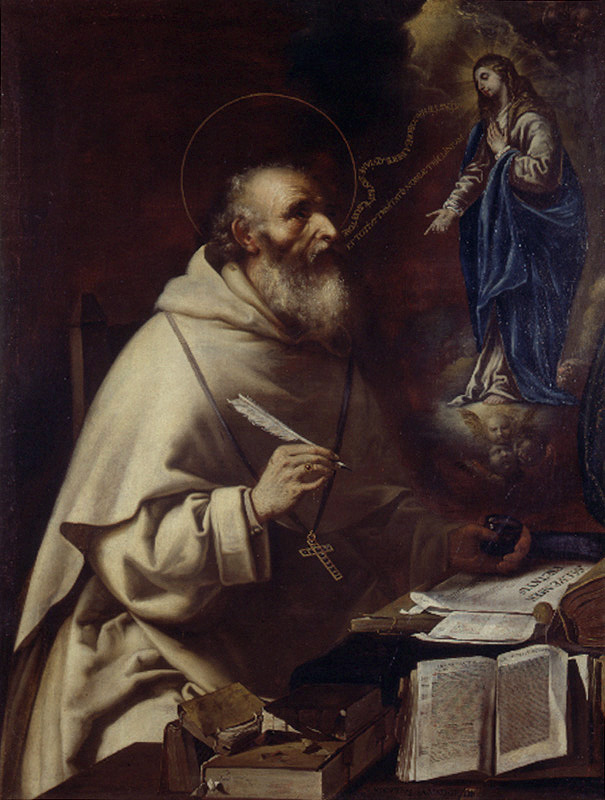
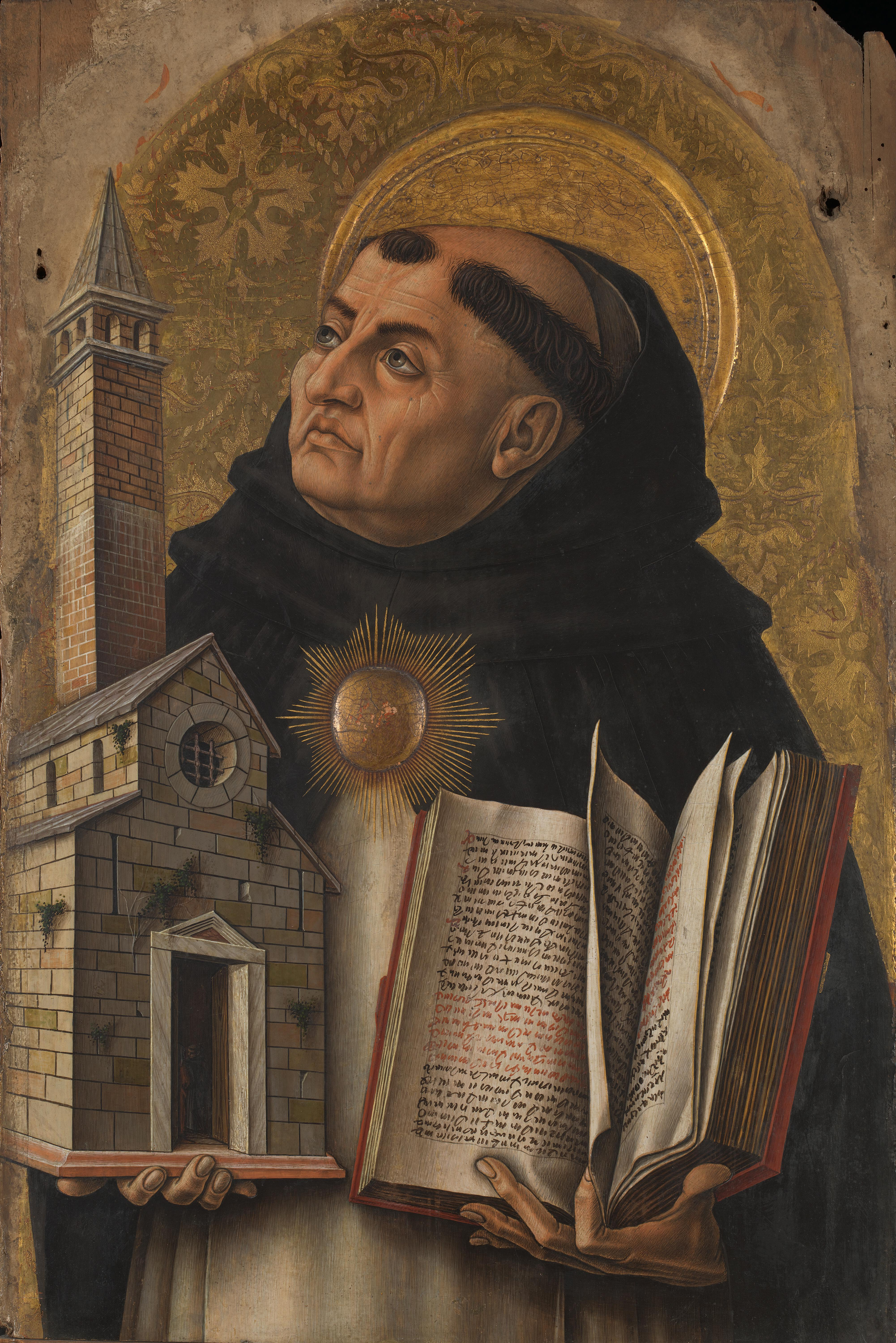
Left: Albert Magnus. Right: Thomas Aquinas

The universities developed in the large cities of Europe during this period, and rival religious orders within the Church began to battle for political and intellectual control over these centers of educational life. The two main orders founded in this period were the Franciscans and the Dominicans. The Franciscans were founded by Francis of Assisi in 1209. Their leader in the middle of the century was Bonaventure, a traditionalist who defended the theology of Augustine and the philosophy of Plato, incorporating only a little of Aristotle in with the more neoplatonist elements. Following Anselm, Bonaventure supposed that reason can discover truth only when philosophy is illuminated by religious faith. Other important Franciscan writers were Duns Scotus, Peter Auriol, and William of Ockham. By contrast, the Dominican order, founded by St Dominic in 1215 placed more emphasis on the use of reason and made extensive use of the new Aristotelian sources derived from the East, and Moorish Spain. The great representatives of Dominican thinking in this period were Albertus Magnus and (especially) Thomas Aquinas, whose artful synthesis of Greek rationalism and Christian doctrine eventually came to define Catholic philosophy. Aquinas placed more emphasis on reason and argumentation, and was one of the first to use the new translation of Aristotle's metaphysical and epistemological writing. This was a significant departure from the Neoplatonic and Augustinian thinking that had dominated much of early Scholasticism. Aquinas showed how it was possible to incorporate much of the philosophy of Aristotle without falling into the "errors" of the Commentator Averroes, though Averroes was influential in the development of Aquinas' philosophy, particularly on metaphysics.

At the start of the 20th century, historian and philosopher Martin Grabmann was the first scholar to work out the outlines of the ongoing development of thought in scholasticism and to see in Thomas Aquinas a response and development of thought rather than a single, coherently emerged and organic whole. Although Grabmann's works in German are numerous, only Thomas Aquinas (1928) is available in English. However, Grabmann's thought was instrumental in the whole modern understanding of scholasticism and the pivotal role of Aquinas.

== Topics ==
All the main branches of philosophy today were once a part of Medieval philosophy. Medieval philosophy also included most of the areas originally established by the pagan philosophers of antiquity, in particular Aristotle. However, the discipline now called Philosophy of religion was, it is presumed, a unique development of the Medieval era, and many of the problems that define the subject first took shape in the Middle Ages, in forms that are still recognisable today.

=== Theology ===
Medieval philosophy is characteristically theological. Subjects discussed in this period include:

- The problem of the compatibility of the divine attributes: How are the attributes traditionally ascribed to the Supreme Being, such as unlimited power, knowledge of all things, infinite goodness, existence outside time, immateriality, and so on, logically consistent with one another?
- The problem of evil: The classical philosophers had speculated on the nature of evil, but the problem of how an all-powerful, all-knowing, loving God could create a system of things in which evil exists first arose in the medieval period.
- The problem of free will: A similar problem was to explain how 'divine foreknowledge' – God's knowledge of what will happen in the future – is compatible with our belief in our own free will.
- Questions regarding the immortality of the intellect, the unity or non-unity between the soul and the intellect, and the consequent intellectual basis for believing in the immortality of the soul.
- The question of whether there can be substances which are non-material, for example, angels.

=== Metaphysics ===
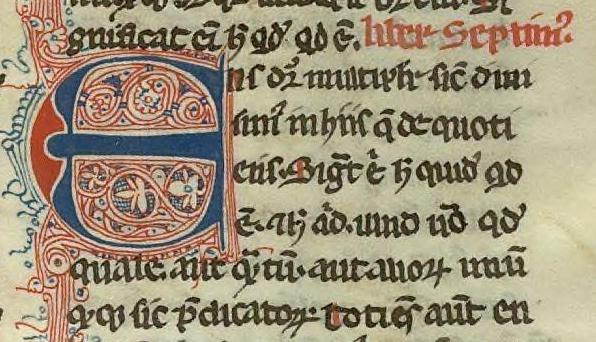
Book 7 of the Metaphysics: Ens dicitur multipliciter – the word 'being' is predicated in many ways

After the 'rediscovery' of Aristotle's Metaphysics in the mid-twelfth century, many scholastics wrote commentaries on this work (in particular Aquinas and Scotus). The problem of universals was one of the main problems engaged during that period. Other subjects included:

- Hylomorphism – development of the Aristotelian doctrine that individual things are a compound of material and form (the statue is a compound of granite, and the form sculpted into it)
- Existence – being qua being
- Causality – Discussion of causality consisted mostly of commentaries on Aristotle, mainly the Physics, On the Heavens, On Generation and Corruption. The approach to this subject area was uniquely medieval, the rational investigation of the universe being viewed as a way of approaching God. Duns Scotus' proof of the existence of God is based on the notion of causality.
- Individuation. The problem of individuation is to explain how we individuate or numerically distinguish the members of any kind for which it is given. The problem arose when it was required to explain how individual angels of the same species differ from one another. Angels are immaterial, and their numerical difference cannot be explained by the different matter they are made of. The main contributors to this discussion were Aquinas and Scotus.

=== Natural philosophy ===
In natural philosophy and the philosophy of science, medieval philosophers were mainly influenced by Aristotle. However, from the fourteenth century onward, the increasing use of mathematical reasoning in natural philosophy prepared the way for the rise of science in the early modern period. The more mathematical reasoning techniques of William Heytesbury and William of Ockham are indicative of this trend. Other contributors to natural philosophy are Albert of Saxony, John Buridan, and Nicholas of Autrecourt.

=== Logic ===
The historian of logic I. M. Bochenski regarded the Middle Ages as one of the three great periods in the history of logic. From the time of Abelard until the middle of the fourteenth century, scholastic writers refined and developed Aristotelian logic to a remarkable degree. In the earlier period, writers such as Peter Abelard wrote commentaries on the works of the Old logic (Aristotle's Categories, On interpretation, and the Isagoge of Porphyry). Later, new departments of logical enquiry arose, and new logical and semantic notions were developed. For logical developments in the Middle Ages, see the articles on insolubilia, obligations, properties of terms, syllogism, and sophismata. Other great contributors to medieval logic include Albert of Saxony, John Buridan, John Wyclif, Paul of Venice, Peter of Spain, Richard Kilvington, Walter Burley, William Heytesbury, and William of Ockham.

=== Philosophy of mind ===
Medieval philosophy of mind is based on Aristotle's De Anima, another work discovered in the Latin West in the twelfth century. It was regarded as a branch of the philosophy of nature. Some of the topics discussed in this area include:

- Divine illumination – The doctrine of Divine illumination was an alternative to naturalism. It holds that humans need a special assistance from God in their ordinary thinking. The doctrine is most closely associated with Augustine and his scholastic followers. It reappeared in a different form in the early modern era.
- theories of demonstration
- mental representation – The idea that mental states have 'intentionality'; i.e., despite being a state of the mind, they are able to represent things outside the mind is intrinsic to the modern philosophy of mind. It has its origins in medieval philosophy. (The word 'intentionality' was revived by Franz Brentano, who was intending to reflect medieval usage). Ockham is well known for his theory that language signifies mental states primarily by convention, real things secondarily, whereas the corresponding mental states signify real things of themselves and necessarily.

Writers in this area include Saint Augustine, Duns Scotus, Nicholas of Autrecourt, Thomas Aquinas, and William of Ockham.

=== Ethics ===
Abu Nasr al-Farabi:

Abu Nasr al-Farabi is well known in the world of medieval Islamic philosophy and ethics for his distinct approach to writing. Deviating from the traditional path of philosophical documentation, al-Farabi wrote in a simplistic manner. There is little immediate intricacy to be observed in his work. In addition to this, al-Farabi wrote in a narrative style. As opposed to listing theories, he told a story with subtle and implicit themes of original ethical concepts.

Contributions:

In his narrative pieces, al-Farabi discussed ethical and philosophical theories with reference to politics, leadership, morals, faith, and civics. Notable works of his include The Attainment of Happiness, in which al-Farabi reasons that conceptions of political science and religion must be built on a foundational understanding of the universe. He advocates that one must first construct notions in relation to universal matters to form just opinions in regard to political philosophy and religion. These two subjects are significant focal points in his work. Much of his writing is deliberated on his perceived conceptions of the juxtaposition and interaction of the aforementioned topics such as his claim that both political and religious figures rest in the same classification as adjacent to a fundamental comprehension of the universe.

Writers in this area include Anselm, Augustine, Peter Abelard, Scotus, Peter of Spain, Aquinas, and Ockham. Writers on political theory include Dante, John Wyclif, and William of Ockham.

== See also ==
- Christian philosophy
- Early Muslim philosophy
- Jewish philosophy
- Nominalism
- Renaissance of the 12th century
- Scholastic philosophy
- Supposition theory
