= Thomas Wilton =

English theologian and scholastic philosopher (active 1288–1322)

Thomas Wilton (active from 1288 to 1322) was an English theologian and scholastic philosopher, a pupil of Duns Scotus, a teacher at the University of Oxford and then the University of Paris, where he taught Walter Burley. He was a Fellow of Merton College from about 1288.

He attacked some of Burley's theses. He wrote on and rejected the theory of motion of Averroes, provoking a reply by John of Jandun. In discussing the eternity of the world, he connects the views of Maimonides and Aquinas.
