= Durandus of Saint-Pourçain =

French Dominican, philosopher, theologian and bishop

Durandus of Saint-Pourçain OP (also known as Durand of Saint-Pourçain; c. 1275 – 13 September 1332 / 10 September 1334) was a French Dominican, philosopher, theologian, and bishop.

== Life ==
He was born at Saint-Pourçain, Auvergne. Little is known of Durandus of Saint-Pourçain prior to 1307 but some small facts. His preliminary work was prepared in some Dominican studium. He entered the Dominican Order at Clermont, and studied at the University of Paris to which he obtained his doctoral degree in 1313. Clement V called him to be Master of the Sacred Palace.

He lectured on the "Sentences" of Peter Lombard. He was at this time submitting ideas that were not exactly parallel to those of Thomas Aquinas. This was the production of the first extensive commentary on the "Sentences", published in 1303–1308 (unedited). After review of the first commentary, it seemed very improbable that Durandus could have been a follower of Aquinas prior to 1307.

Since Thomas Aquinas was held at a higher standing than any other doctor within the Dominican order, they were to defend and uphold his ideas predominately. This caused Durand to be criticized from one of the leading Dominican followers of Aquinas, Hervaeus Natalis. This was a doctoral quarrel and an illustration of the fourteenth-century doctoral tensions. It was at this time that Durandus of Saint-Pourçain set out to write his second commentary on the "Sentences", which he adhered more closely to Aquinas's way.

This second version of the commentary was written around 1310–1312 (unedited). This did much to help respond to the criticisms that he had received previously but instead brought on more criticism and grief. Additionally, his scholarly efforts and the receipt of his doctrine in theology, from the University of Paris in 1312, did not make much of a difference either, leading to the Dominican order initiating two formal investigations. The first investigation was in 1312–1314 and the other in 1316/17.

Despite these conflicts, Durandus was appointed to lecture at papal curia in Avignon. He was consecrated Bishop in three places; first of Limoux, then of Le Puy-en-Velay in 1318, and was transferred to the diocese of Meaux in 1326, where he later died. He was highly regarded by Pope John XXII and assigned by him to examine the orthodoxy of William Ockham in 1324–25. The pope also consulted him on difficult cases with many entrusted diplomatic missions attributed to him.

Meanwhile, Durand wrote his last of the three commentaries, the one for which he is most famous. In this final commentary, Durand returned to several of his initial stances. He was not just famous for this controversial commentary and the earlier one, but also for his surveying of Aquinas in the Dominican order and being influential throughout the early modern period. He became known as Doctor Resolutissimus owing to his strenuous advocacy of certain opinions novel to contemporary academics. Although Durandus faced many controversial issues both inside and outside his order, centuries later he was commended for his work alongside Bonaventure.

Durand died in Meaux.

== Work ==
His writings include:

- Commentaries on the Sentences:
  - First Version (1303–1308)
  - Second Version (1310–1312)
  - Third Version (1317–1327)
- Five Quodlibeta (1312–1316).

His nominalism was so much opposed to the contemporary philosophical realism that the third period of Scholasticism is made to begin with him. He rejects both the sensible and the intelligible species (species intelligibiles), introduced, he says, to explain sense-perception, as also the active intellect. He denies the principle of individuation, as distinct from the specific nature of the individual.

Durandus invented the notion of an intrinsically evil act, which he explains in the context of the concept of fortification, where "it" is intrinsically evil. In the ideas of fortification, Durandus does indeed coincide with Thomas Aquinas and his natural-law argument, but only in simple fortification.

In theology he argued for a separation of natural knowledge (cognitio naturalis) from that obtained through faith and revelation. Durandus argues that certain dogmas, such as that of the Trinity, cannot be shown not to contain impossibilities, but that to believe them nevertheless increases the merit of faith. Because the miracles of Christ do not prove his divinity, Durandus says, his acceptance by Christians enhances the merit of believing. After all, says Durandus, theology is not strictly a science, since it rests on faith, not on the first principles of knowledge. Durandus teaches, besides, that all actions proceed from God who gives the power to act, but that this is no immediate influx of the creator upon the actions of the creature. According to Durandus, the sacraments are only causes without which grace is not conferred, and marriage is not strictly a sacrament. He also suggests that Christ could be present in the Eucharist with the substances of bread and wine remaining.

Throughout, Durandus shows willingness to be corrected by the Catholic Church. By order of Pope John XXII the treatise De statu animarum was examined, and theologians concluded that it contained eleven errors.
