= Landolfo Caracciolo =

Neapolitan Catholic bishop (died 1351)

Historiated initial at the start of Caracciolo's commentary on the Sentences in a 14th-century manuscript

Landolfo Caracciolo (Latin: Landulphus Caracciolus; died 1351) was a Franciscan theologian, diplomat and prelate from the Kingdom of Naples. He was the archbishop of Amalfi from 1331 until his death.

== Life ==
Landolfo Caracciolo, whose name is sometimes anglicized Landulf or Landulph, was born in Naples in the final quarter of the 13th century, probably around 1280 or 1285. His father, Giovanni, had been knighted in 1275, appointed captain of Amalfi in 1300 and named royal treasurer in 1303. Landolfo had three brothers. He obtained a Master of Theology degree, probably from the University of Paris. He joined the Franciscans at an unknown date and served as minister provincial of the Terra di Lavoro from 1320 to 1325.

In May–June 1326, Caracciolo was sent by King Robert on a diplomatic mission to Bologna, where he negotiated the provision of 200 knights and 300 lances for beleaguered Florence, then governed by Robert's son, Charles, Duke of Calabria. On 21 August 1327, Caracciolo was appointed bishop of Castellammare di Stabia. On 7 July 1331, the king sought to have the monastery on the island of Rovigliano transferred to his administration in order to increase his income. Before this could happen, Caracciolo was transferred to the richer archdiocese of Amalfi on 20 September 1331. On 29 February 1332, he received the pallium from Pope John XXII, who praised him for helping to suppress the sect of the Fraticelli in the Kingdom of Naples.

As archbishop, Caracciolo built a new choir in Amalfi Cathedral. John XXII authorized him to take further action against the Fraticelli. In 1340, he attended the consecration of the church of Santa Chiara. In September–October 1347, he was one of the negotiators at Catania who reached a peace treaty with the Kingdom of Sicily. He subsequently visited Avignon, perhaps in the following of Queen Joan I in 1348.

On 17 March 1349, Caracciolo was appointed logothete and protonotary while his relative, Enrico Caracciolo, was named chamberlain. After Enrico was killed on 25 April, Landolfo lost all influence. He died probably in 1351 and was buried in the cathedral. His anniversary was celebrated by the Franciscans on 1 March.

== Works ==
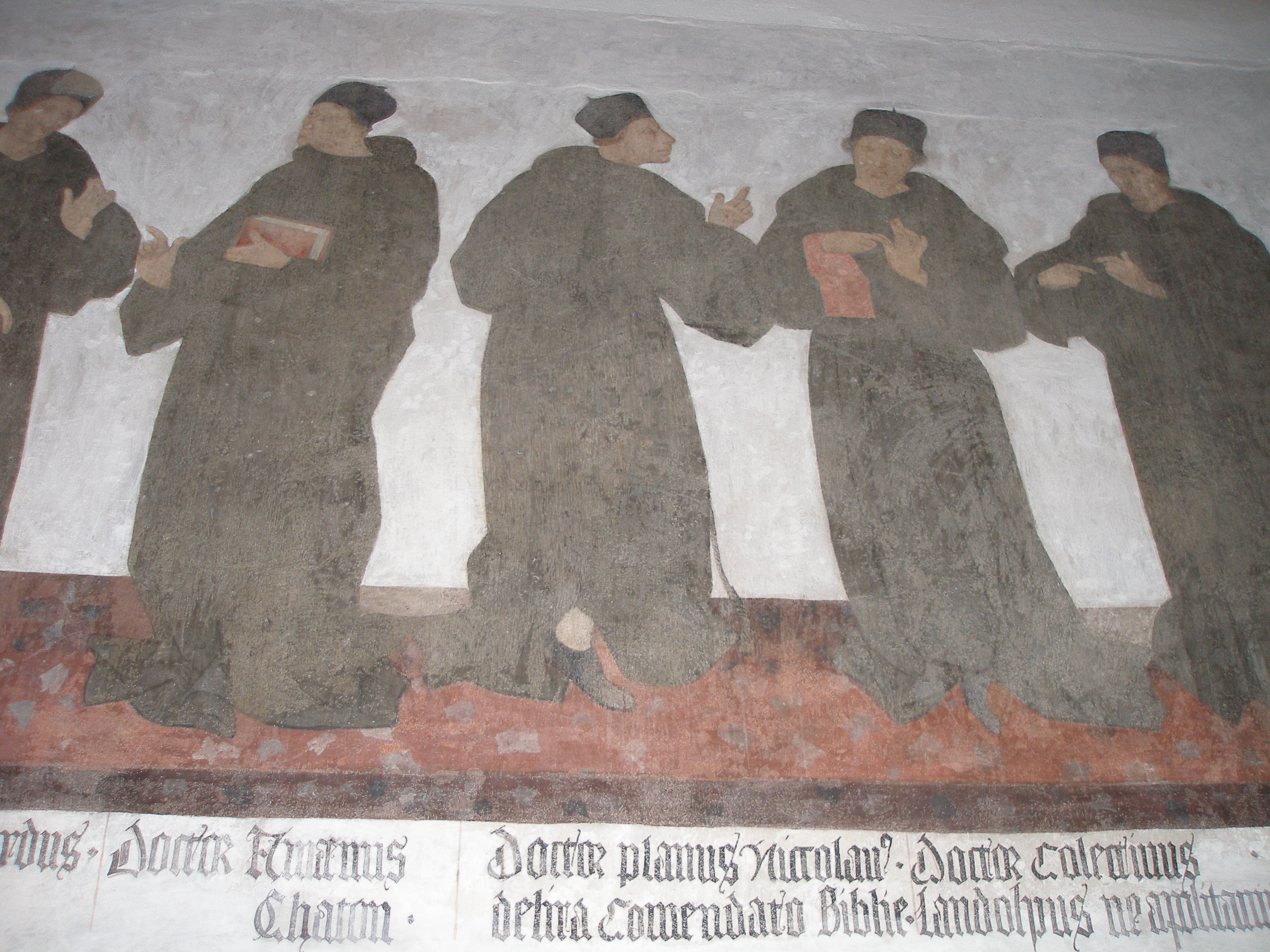
Caracciolo (second from right) depicted in a fresco from the Franciscan Friary, Bolzano (1500)

=== Sermons and speeches ===
Latin manuscript 4376 in the Vatican Library preserves a set of sermons by Caracciolo. It also includes two speeches:

- Coram papa, delivered before the pope and the college of cardinals in Avignon, is a defence of Joan I's policy.
- In morte regis Andree is about the assassination of Joan's husband, Andrew of Hungary.

Manuscript 513 of the Biblioteca Comunale di Assisi contains sermons by Caracciolo and François de Meyronnes without specifying who authored what. The sermon Produxit filium regis et posuit super eum dyadem et testimonium (a quotation of 2 Kings 11:12) is a memorial sermon for King Robert's brother, Saint Louis of Toulouse, preached after 1317. It is found in two other manuscripts, still anonymous.

=== Philosophical and theological writings ===
Caracciolo received the scholastic accolade doctor collectivus. He was a Scotist whose theological writings show the influence of Matthew of Aquasparta and William of Ware. Much of his philosophical writing is devoted to defending John Duns Scotus against the attacks of Peter Auriol. His known works are:

- a commentary on the Sentences of Peter Lombard, written while he was a student and dedicated to King Robert
- In Zachariam prophetam, a commentary on the Book of Zechariah
- In IV Evangelia, a commentary on the Gospel of John
- In epistolam ad Hebraeos, a commentary on the Epistle to the Hebrews
- Postilla super Evangelia dominicalia, dedicated to Monaldo da Perugia
- Liber collationum spiritualium
- Quaestiones in Metaphysicam

His works are preserved in many manuscripts. Over thirty contain at least one complete book of his commentary on the Sentences. Book 2 of this commentary was printed at Naples by Francesco Del Tuppo in the final decade of the 15th century.

Caracciolo is most famous in philosophy for his theory of instantaneous change. He held that, in the concept of an instantaneous change, "a real contradiction is accepted in nature, because the termini of instantaneous change cannot ... belong to different instants of time." The law of non-contradiction, however, is not violated because "the instant of time containing a contradictory state of affairs can be divided, although not physically, into instants of nature."

A lost work by Caracciolo on the Immaculate Conception is cited in the Elucidarium virginis of Antonio Bonito de Cucharo (1507). Marco Palma assigns quodlibeta to him, but William Duba says that none have been identified.

Ars sermocinandi, a technical treatise on the art of preaching, has been attributed to Caracciolo. In one manuscript from Bologna, the author is given as a Franciscan master named Landulphus de Manzoriis.

== Bibliography ==
- Amadori, Saverio (2000). "L'exemplum biblico: Il Liber de exemplis Sacrae Scripturae di Nicolò di Hanapes". Sincronie (7): 65–84.
- Brown, Stephen F. (2015). "Landolfo Caracciolo on the Scientific Character of Theology". Recherches de théologie et philosophie médiévales. 82 (2): 241–269. JSTOR 26486057.
- Charland, Thomas-Marie (1936). Artes praedicandi: contribution à l'histoire de la rhétorique au Moyen Âge. Ottawa: Institut d'Études Médiévales.
- Duba, William O. (2007). "Continental Franciscan Quodlibeta after Scotus". In Christopher Schabel (ed.). Theological Quodlibeta in the Middle Ages: The Fourteenth Century. Brill. pp. 569–649.
- Kelly, Samantha (2003). The New Solomon: Robert of Naples (1309–1343) and Fourteenth-Century Kingship. Brill.
- Knuuttila, Simo; Lehtinen, Anja Inkeri (1979). "Change and Contradiction: A Fourteenth-Century Controversy". Synthese. 40: 189–207. doi:10.1007/BF00413950.
- Palma, Marco (1976). "Caracciolo, Landolfo". Dizionario Biografico degli Italiani (in Italian). Vol. 19: Cappi–Cardona. Rome: Institute of the Italian Encyclopaedia. ISBN 978-88-12-00032-6.
- Schabel, Christopher D. (2009). "The Commentary on the Sentences by Landulphus Caracciolus, OFM". Bulletin de Philosophie Médiévale. 51: 145–219. doi:10.1484/j.bpm.3.610.
- Schabel, Christopher D. (2011a). "The Reception of Peter Auriol's Doctrine of Place, with Editions of Questions by Landulph Caracciolo and Gerard of Siena". In Tiziana Suarez-Nani; Martin Rohde (eds.). Représentations et conceptions de l'espace dans la culture médiévale: Colloque Fribourgeois 2009. De Gruyter. doi:10.1515/9783110259438.147.
- Schabel, Christopher D. (2011b). "Landulph Caracciolo". In Henrik Lagerlund (ed.). Encyclopedia of Medieval Philosophy. Springer. pp. 681–684. doi:10.1007/978-1-4020-9729-4_296. ISBN 978-1-4020-9728-7.
