= R. De Staningtona =

13th Century Dominican Friar

R. De Staningtona was a friar, likely of the Dominican Order, who was at Oxford University in the mid-1250s. He composed a noteworthy summary of libri naturales (works of natural philosophy) by Aristotle. His summary was entitled Compilacio quedam liborum naturalium. The manuscript has never been edited although selections from it have appeared in the Journal of the History of Philosophy. The final work he summarized was De anima.

R. De Staningtona made use of the explanations of Averroes in compiling his text. His work was probably employed in the Oxford Dominican convent for the preliminary education of the brothers. Many of these people were not degree candidates. De Staningtona's tract was useful in providing a medium for the influence of Richard Fishacre, especially for those who were unlikely to read Fishacre's commentary on the Books of Sentences by Peter Lombard.
