= Petrus Thomae =

Catalan Franciscan philosopher and theologian

Presentation miniature from Le Deffenseur de l'Immaculée Conception de la glorieuse vierge Marie, Antoine de Lévis's French translation of Peter's Liber de originali Virginis conceptione, made for Joan, Duchess of Bourbon.

Petrus Thomae (fl. 1314–1336), known in Catalan as Pere Tomàs or anglicized as Peter Thomae, was a Catalan Franciscan philosopher and theologian. He was an eminent Scotist who died while in prison on charges of sorcery.

== Life ==
Peter was born in Catalonia around 1280. He joined the Franciscans in the province of Santiago de Compostela. It is unknown where he was educated. The universities of Paris, Toulouse, Cambridge and Salamanca have all been suggested. He may have studied under John Duns Scotus. He does not appear to have finished his studies. John the Canon refers to him only as a bachelor.

Peter was a lecturer at the Franciscan school in Barcelona between 1314 and 1332. It was during this period that he wrote all his known works. In 1314, he took part in the investigation of Arnau de Villanova. In 1324–1325, he lectured at the University of Barcelona on the Sentences of Peter Lombard. In 1332, he left for Avignon to serve the Papacy as an abbreviator. He later served Pope John XXII as a penitentiary. In 1336, he was imprisoned at Noves on accusations of sorcery. He died in prison some time before 13 October 1340.

== Works ==
Peter was a Scotist and a Formalist. According to custom, he was granted several scholastic epithets, including doctor strenuus, doctor invincibilis, doctor proficuus and doctor serenus. He is elsewhere praised as eximius doctor ('outstanding doctor'), egregius et subtilissimus vir ('excellent and most subtle man') and magnus scotista ('great Scotist').

=== Philosophy ===
Peter's known philosophical works are:

- Commentarium in primum librum Sententiarum (preserved in a single manuscript)
- De esse intelligibili (four manuscripts)
- De ente (three manuscripts)
- Formalitates (twenty-eight manuscripts), in fact two related works:
  - Formalitates breves, also called De distinctione praedicamentorum
  - Formalitates conflatiles, also called De modis distinctionum or De modis distinctionis
- Quodlibet (one manuscript)
- De unitate minori (one manuscript)
- Quaestiones in Metaphysicam Aristotelis (one manuscript)

In addition, Peter refers in Quodlibet to a commentary on the second book of the Sentences, but it does not survive. The commentary on the first book, Commentarium in primum librum Sententiarum, is preserved only in a single very poor manuscript.

De distinctione praedicamentorum, or rather a version of the Formalitates intermediate between it and De modis distinctionis, was translated into Catalan. It is partially preserved in an Italian manuscript of the fifteenth or sixteenth century containing fourteen fragments written in Hebrew script.

=== Theology ===
Peter's known theological works are:

- De divite christiano (two manuscripts)
- Liber de originali Virginis conceptione (six manuscripts), which goes by many names: Tractatus de conceptione Beatae Mariae Virginis, Liber de originali Virginis innocentia, Liber de originali innocentia virginis Mariae

De divite christiano is an "exegetico-moral work". The Liber de originali Virginis conceptione is dedicated to Archbishop John of Aragon. It was written between 1320, when the archbishop was consecrated, and 1327, when his father, King James II, died. It was submitted to John XXII.

== Bibliography ==
- Baum, Ilil (2021). "Traces of Late Medieval Jewish Scotism: A Catalan Translation in Hebrew Script of De distinctione predicamentorum by Petrus Thomae". Medieval Encounters. 26 (6): 543–577. doi:10.1163/15700674-12340088. S2CID 233935967.
- Bos, Egbert P. (2000). "Petrus Thomae's De Distinctione Predicamentorum (with a Working Edition)". In Maria Kardaun; Joke Spruyt (eds.). The Winged Chariot: Collected Essays on Plato and Platonism in Honour of L.M. de Rijk. Brill. pp. 277–312. doi:10.1163/9789004247543_011.
- Bos, Egbert P., ed. (2002). The Tract De unitate minori of Petrus Thome. Peeters.
- Brady, Ignatius (1955). "The Development of the Doctrine on the Immaculate Conception in the Fourteenth Century After Aureoli". Franciscan Studies. 15 (2): 175–202. doi:10.1353/frc.1955.0005. JSTOR 41974533. S2CID 170081561.
- Bridges, Geoffrey G. (1959). Identity and Distinction in Petrus Thomae, O.F.M. The Franciscan Institute.
- Dumont, Stephen D. (1988). "The Univocity of the Concept of Being in the Fourteenth Century: II. The De ente of Peter Thomae". Mediaeval Studies. 50: 186–256. doi:10.1484/J.MS.2.306354.
- Gál, Gedeon (1998). "Petrus Thomae's Proof for the Existence of God". Franciscan Studies. 56: 115–118. doi:10.1353/frc.1998.0002. JSTOR 41975235. S2CID 201753586.
- Hooper, M. Rachel; Buytaert, Eligius M., eds. (1957). Petrus Thomae O.F.M.: Quodlibet. The Franciscan Institute.
- López Alcalde, Celia; Batalla, Josep, eds. (2011). Pere Tomàs, Tractatus brevis de modis distinctionum. Obrador edèndum.
- Martí de Barcelona (1927). "Fra Pere Tomàs, Doctor strenuus et invincibilis". Estudis Franciscans. 39: 90–103.
- Mohan, Gaudens E. (1948). "Petrus Thomae's Proof for the Existence of God". Franciscan Studies. 8 (3): 285–294. JSTOR 41974315.
- Smith, Garrett R. (2010). "Bibliotheca manuscripta Petri Thomae". Bulletin de Philosophie Médiévale. 52: 161–200. doi:10.1484/J.BPM.1.102150.
- Smith, Garrett R. (2014). "The Origin of Intelligibility According to Duns Scotus, William of Alnwick, and Petrus Thomae". Recherches de théologie et philosophie médiévales. 81 (1): 37–74. JSTOR 26485893.
- Smith, Garrett R., ed. (2015). Petri Thomae Quaestiones de esse intelligibili. Leuven University Press.
- Smith, Garrett R., ed. (2018). Petri Thomae Quaestiones de ente. Leuven University Press.
