= Peter Lombard's Sentences (Gonville and Caius College MS 290/682) =

University of Cambridge manuscript

Cambridge, Gonville and Caius College, MS 290/682
- Gonville and Caius College, Cambridge
- Type: Manuscript
- Place of origin: England
- Language: Latin
- Author(s): Peter Lombard and others
- Material: Vellum
- Size: 344 × 245 mm; 369 leaves
- Format: Double columns
- Condition: Binding marred and torn
- Contents: Sentences and theological miscellanea

Cambridge, Gonville and Caius College, MS 290/682 (Caius 290/682) is a manuscript held by Gonville and Caius College at the University of Cambridge since the late 14th century.

A scholarly florilegium, the primary text is a Latin copy of Peter Lombard's Sentences, which has been supplemented with other theological miscellanea.

== Description ==
Caius 290/682 is a paginated manuscript comprising 713 vellum pages across 357 principal folios plus an additional 12 leaves. Most of the manuscript consists of Peter Lombard's Sentences, while approximately 175 pages also contain other scholastic texts. Marginal text occurs on most pages.

The 15th-century binding consists of wooden boards approximately 5 millimetres (0.20 in) thick. It is covered with dark goatskin, scuffed and torn in places exposing the boards beneath.

The folios measure 344 by 245 millimetres (13.5 in × 9.6 in). The main text is arranged in two columns, typically with 40 lines per column. The marginal texts are also usually in two columns but are denser, typically with 71 lines per column. It is collated into 31 quires, with six flyleaves at each end. Four flyleaves at either end are taken from a 13th-century copy of the Digest of Justinian.

The first quire, pp. 1-24, is written on cruder parchment than the main part of the codex, and was bound or rebound with the main manuscript in the early 15th century.

== Provenance ==
Arms of Gonville and Caius College

The manuscript was recorded at Gonville Hall, the predecessor of Gonville and Caius College, by the late 14th century. According to the college's records, it was previously owned by Adam de Lakenheath, a 14th-century chancellor of Cambridge, and was bequeathed by John of Linstead to the college.

An inscription on the flyleaf at folio VI reads "Liber collegii Annunciacionis b. Maria Cantebrig' ex dono Magri Ade Lakynggythe doctoris in theologia", or "The book of the College of the Annunciation of the Blessed Mary at Cambridge, from the gift of Master Adam Lakynghythe, doctor of Theology". The College of the Annunciation of the Blessed Mary was another name for Gonville Hall.

Another opening flyleaf reads "Amen quod Henfridus de la Poole", and another reads "Liber collegii annunciacionis beate Marie. Homo quid superbis I. W.", or "Book of the College of the Annunciation of the Blessed Mary. Man, why are you proud?" The table of contents is signed "Cabolde", which may refer to Thomas Cabold.

== Contents ==
Miniature of Peter Lombard

The main text of Caius 290/682 is a rubricated Latin copy of Peter Lombard's Sentences, produced in England. Dating to the late 13th or early 14th century, it occupies pp. 25–190, 243–501, 532–562 and 565–690 with illuminations on nine pages. During this period, the study of theology at the universities of Oxford and Cambridge primarily focused on the Bible and Lombard's Sentences.

The manuscript has been supplemented with other material, creating a scholarly florilegium. Most of the additions were written in the margins, and much of the material belongs to the Sentences commentary tradition. These include part of Gregory of Rimini's Lectura super Sententias, as well as commentary and questions on it by Nicholas Aston, Robert Holcot, Petrus Aureoli and two anonymous writers.

Other works relate to theology more generally; Sumithra David writes that they were likely to have been of interest to a student of theology. The largest work added to the manuscript, running from pages 411a to 683b, is an alphabetical theological reference collection extending from Abicere to Zelus. The manuscript names this as Distinctiones Gorhami by Nicholas of Gorran, but Cal Ledsham found that that its opening and closing words do not correspond to the Gorran manuscripts catalogued by Stegmuller. Morton W. Bloomfield instead associated its opening words with Stephen Langton's Exempla.

It also includes brief extracts from three of Gerald of Wales's works: the Topographia hibernica, the Expugnatio hibernica, and the Speculum ecclesiae. Written in the margins of pages 684 and 685, these extracts are a mixed group and include descriptions of Ireland, a vision of Henry II and warnings about giving ecclesiastics excessive power. They are written in a hurried hand, which led David to speculate that they may have been "the subject of a cursory lecture". Catherine Rooney dates this writing to mid to late 14th century.

Peter of Blois's Compendium in Iob, an exposition of the Book of Job, is included in two parts, on pp. 34b-38b and 85a-90b. Gildea dates this witness to the late 13th or early 14th century. Other material includes extracts from William of Ockham's Quodlibeta, a compilation of Jerome's letters, and Bernard of Clairvaux's Homiliae super "Missus est" and Liber de praecepto et dispensatione.
