= John of Lichtenberg =

German Dominican philosopher (c. 1275 – c. 1315)

- Born: c. 1275
- Died: c. 1315

John of Lichtenberg (c. 1275 – c. 1315), also known as John of Picardy, was a German Dominican Thomist philosopher. He was influenced by Albert the Great. He wrote on Peter Lombard's Sentences.
