= Summa sententiarum =

Mediaeval theological work consisting of six treatises

Summa sententiarum (transl. Summary of Sentences; written between 1138 and 1141) is a medieval theological work consisting of six treatises. Several codices and the Patrologia Latina contain the seventh treatise on marriage, authored by Walter of Mortagne.

The subjects of the treatises are as follows:

1. Three theological virtues, the Trinity and the incarnation;
2. Creation and condition of angelic nature;
3. Creation and condition of human nature;
4. Sacraments in general and God's commandments;
5. The sacrament of Baptism;
6. Sacraments of Confirmation, Eucharist, Penance and Anointing.

== Authorship ==
Numerous manuscripts contain divergent manuscript attributions: "Magister Odo", "Odo episcopus de Luca", "Odo ex dictis magistri Hugonis", "iuxta magistrum Anselmum et magistrum Hugonem", "Magister Hugo". In the past, the authorship of all the treatises was commonly attributed to Hugo of St. Victor. The current consensus is that the attribution was false. Some of scholars still agree, that the author was someone named Hugo, however his identity is disputed.

Among the possible authors of the work are Hugh of Mortagne, Odo of Soissons, Odo of Saint Victor, Otto or Odo of Lucca, and Hildebert of Lavardin.

== Sources and influences ==
Sources utilized by the author include Hugo's Summa de sacramentis, Walter of Mortagne's Tractatus de Trinitate, and collections of sentences starting with words "Deus itaque summe" and "Principium et causa omnium" (Sententiae Anselmi).

Most of the Summa sententiarum was incorporated into Peter Lombard's Sentences. Master Roland of Bononia also used this work.

== Bibliography ==
- Gastaldelli, Ferruccio. “La ‘Summa sententiarum’ di Ottone da Lucca: Conclusione di un dibatto secolare.” Salesianum 42 (1980): 537-46.
- Wielockx, Robert. “La sentence ‘De caritate’ et la discussion scolastique de l’amour.” Ephemerides theologicae Lovanienses 58 (1982): 50–86, 334–54; 59 (1983): 26–45.
