= Montesinos =

Montesinos may refer to:

- Vladimiro Montesinos, former head of Peru's intelligence service.
- Luis de Montesinos, a Spanish theologian.
- Antonio de Montesinos (Dominican friar), who in 1511 was the first member of the clergy to publicly speak about the human rights of the indigenous peoples of the Americas.
- Fernando de Montesinos, (1593-1655). (ru:Монтесинос, Фернандо)
- Antonio de Montezinos, who in 1644 claimed to have found one of the Ten Lost Tribes of Israel living in the Ecuadorean jungles.
- Cueva de Montesinos, a cave in La Mancha, Spain
