= Francis of Marchia =

Italian Franciscan theologian and philosopher

Francis of Marchia (c. 1290 - after 1344) was an Italian Franciscan theologian and philosopher. He was an ally of William of Ockham and Michael of Cesena, and opponent of Pope John XXII, in the struggles of the Franciscan Spirituals, leading to his expulsion from the order in 1329. He was commenting on the Sentences of Peter Lombard around 1320, but no longer closely bound to Lombard; for example he incidentally theorises on projectile motion, views now thought to be taken from Richard Rufus of Cornwall. He was nicknamed Doctor succinctus ('the concise teacher').

== Life ==
After his initial education Francis of Marchia became an instructor at various places to include a studia. His most famous teachings were his commentaries on the Sentences at the University of Paris. It is likely that Marchia's lectures were transcribed by his students, which he edited resulting in several versions of his commentary in manuscript form. Before leaving for Avignon around 1324 to teach at a Franciscan convent, Marchia composed several scholarly commentaries, including two on Aristotle's Metaphysics and one on Physics. The Quodlibet was written afterwards, between 1324 and 1328. Marchia supported the Franciscan Minister General, Michael of Cesena, and renounced Pope John XXII's concept of poverty in 1328. Following the renunciation he fled with Michael and William of Ockham to Munich. The Improbatio, a rebuttal to the Pope's Papal bull titled Quia vir reprobus, was written during this time, as well as the Allegationes Religiosorum Vivorum, co-authored by Marchia and Ockham and assembled by Michael. In 1343 Marchia repented and died shortly after.

== Philosophy ==
=== Property Rights ===
In the Improbatio, Francis of Marchia focuses on determining when and where property rights originated to support the Franciscan belief that Christ lived in absolute poverty. He distinguishes between two types of dominia: the dominium before the fall and the dominium after. The dominium before the fall, also known as the dominion of the prelapsarian state, was a time where all of God's creatures rejoiced in happiness, were deeply connected to one another, and shared in God's creation. The dominium after the fall was caused by the first sin of Adam, making the issue of property rights distinctly human.

Francesco pointed out "that divine permission for the Fall of man is a consequence of God's willing that Christ be the Redeemer." In such a way, the Fall (and the dominium after the Fall) are a consequent of the Incarnation, not an antecedent.

The Pope had denied that the origin of property was linked to humans, claiming that it was sin itself that was the cause. Marchia agreed that without sin there would be no property rights, however, sin did not immediately bring about the concept of property. Francis maintained it was human law that was responsible for the formation of property rights, not Divine law, and used the story of Cain and Abel, citing Cain's corrupted will to support his belief.

=== Projectile Motion ===
Francis of Marchia's theory of projectile motion, referred to as virtus derelicta, is described in the sections of his commentaries on Sentences explaining the consecration of the Eucharist. Virtus derelicta states: the motion of an object is caused by a force left behind by the object that acted upon it. Unlike the theory of inertia meant to explain natural phenomenon, Marchia formulates virtus derelicta to be an all-inclusive explanation of both natural and supernatural phenomena.

Virtus derelicta explains several different kinds of motion – perpetual and finite - and is meant to account for unnatural changes. Key elements of virtus derelicta include:

- An object is put in motion by another object, which leaves virtus derelicta in the moving object.
- At the beginning of any given motion, virtus derelicta can work with or against the natural disposition of the object in motion.
- If it works against the moving object, virtus derelicta will dissipate and eventually leave the body, ceasing motion.
- If it works with the moving object, virtus derelicta stays in the object causing the potential for perpetual motion.

There are several philosophers before Marchia's time, such as Richard Rufus of Cornwall from the 13th century, that seem to form their own versions of virtus derelicta, so it is unclear whether this theory truly originated from Marchia. It is evident, however, that philosophers such as Jean Buridan and Gerard Odonis used Marchia's theory to refine their own concepts of virtus derelicta, confirming that the Franciscan played a key role in the evolution of philosophy on physics.

=== Act of the Will ===
Another focus of Francis of Marchia's commentary on the Sentences posed in Book II was how the will could act against reason resulting in moral culpability: whether the will could either act prior to, or against rational judgment. Marchia argued that the will is the cause of action. After a judgment is made, the will decides to act either in accordance with that judgment or against it. The will constitutes the middle term between judgment and action. Without it, the judgment would necessitate action, negating the concept of free will and moral culpability. In addition, the will is under a law that obliges it to perform good acts. Without this obligation there would be no sin.

To answer how the will could go against this obligation, Marchia distinguishes between apprehensive and a judicative acts. Apprehensive acts are necessary for the will to function, and are result of intellectual cognitions and judgments. Judicative acts are formed from more complex knowledge where reasoning is judiciously applied. Volition does not require judicative acts to be performed, which explains how humans are able to sin. In other words, the will does not depend on rational judgment.

To avoid the objection that judgment is required for reasoning and cannot be ignored in the deliberative process, Marchia offers a further distinction between apprehensive and judicative knowledge, and two types of rational reflective judgments. These distinctions allow for one judgment to be selected over another due to the strength it receives from being selected by the will.
