= Richard Rufus of Cornwall =

Cornish philosopher and theologian (d. c.1260)

Richard Rufus (Latin: Ricardus Rufus, lit. "Richard the Red"; d. c. AD 1260) was a Cornish Franciscan scholastic philosopher and theologian.

== Life ==
Richard Rufus who studied at Paris and at Oxford starting from the 1220s. He became a Franciscan around 1230. Rufus was one of the first medieval philosophers to write on Aristotle and his commentaries are the earliest known among those which have survived. He also wrote influential commentaries on Peter Lombard's Sentences. Rufus was influenced by Robert Grosseteste, Alexander of Hales, Richard Fishacre, and Johannes Philoponus, and in turn influenced Bonaventure and Franciscus Meyronnes. Roger Bacon was a fervent critic of Rufus, claiming that his fame was greatest with the ignorant multitude; on the other hand, Thomas of Eccleston praised him as an excellent lecturer. Adam de Marisco describes him in a letter to Grosseteste as "a man lacking in command of the English tongue, yet of most honest conversation and unblemished reputation, learned in human and divine literature." The reason given for his lack of proficiency with English is that he was primarily a Cornish speaker.

== Works ==
- Peter Raedts, Richard Rufus of Cornwall and the Tradition of Oxford Theology. Oxford historical monographs (Oxford University 1984, PhD).
- Richard Rufus of Cornwall, In Aristotelis De Generatione et corruptione, edited by Rega Wood and Neil Lewis, 'Auctores Britannici Medii Aevi', New York: Oxford University Press, 2004.
- Richard Rufus of Cornwall, In Physicam Aristotelis, edited by Rega Wood, 'Auctores Britannici Medii Aevi', New York: Oxford University Press, 2011.
