= Scholastic accolades =

Epithets (surnames or nicknames) for excellent scholars

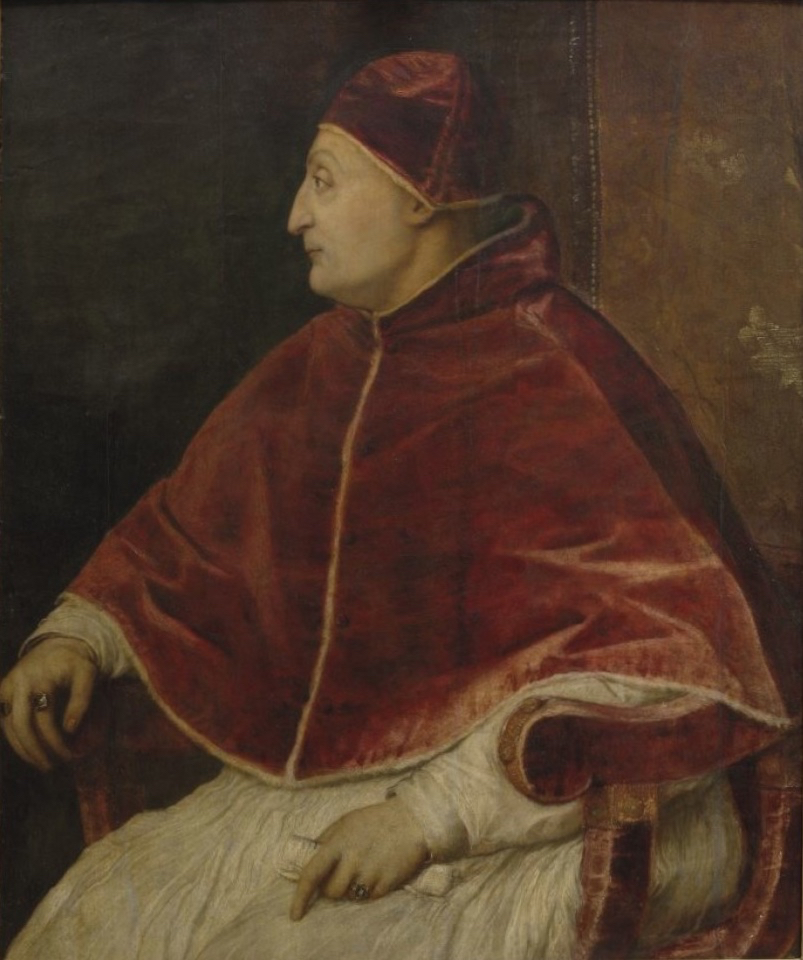
Doctor Acutissimus

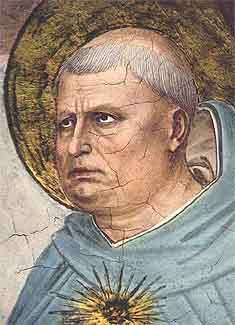
Doctor Angelicus

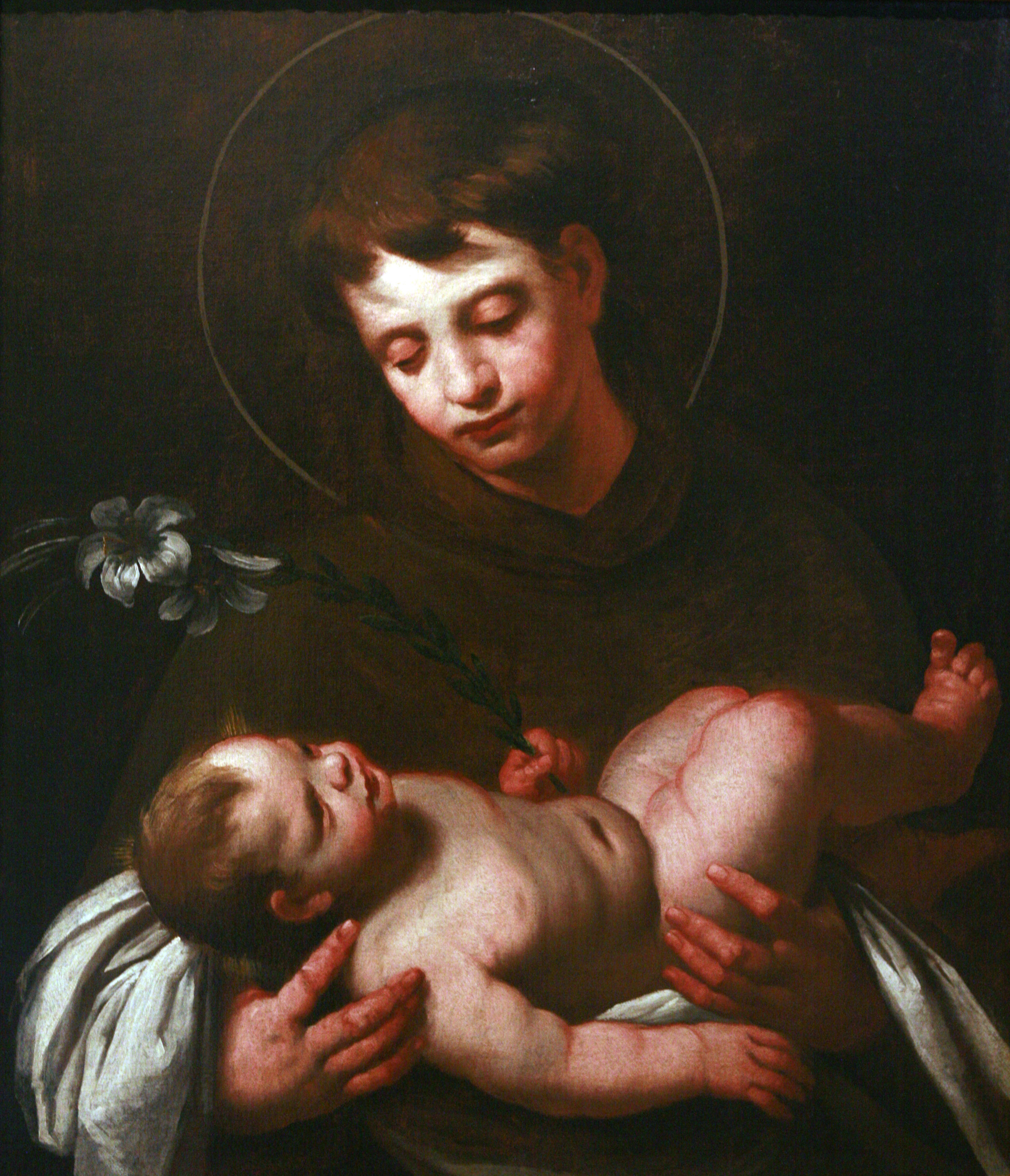
Doctor Arca testamenti; Evangelical Doctor

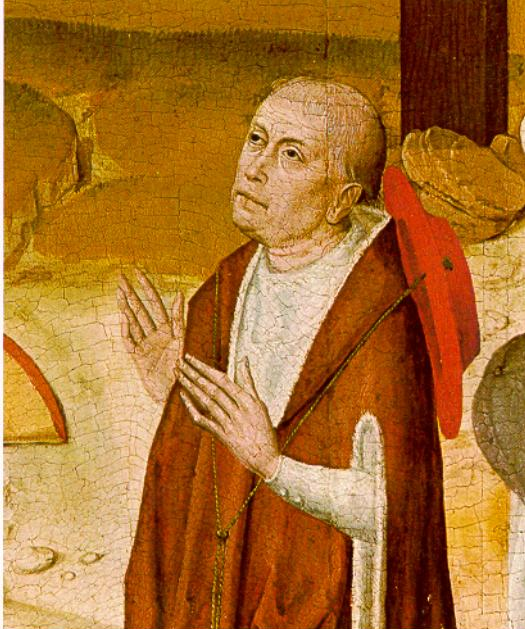
Doctor Christianus

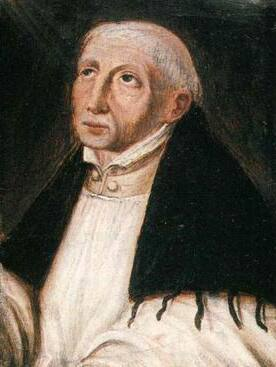
Divinus Ecstaticus

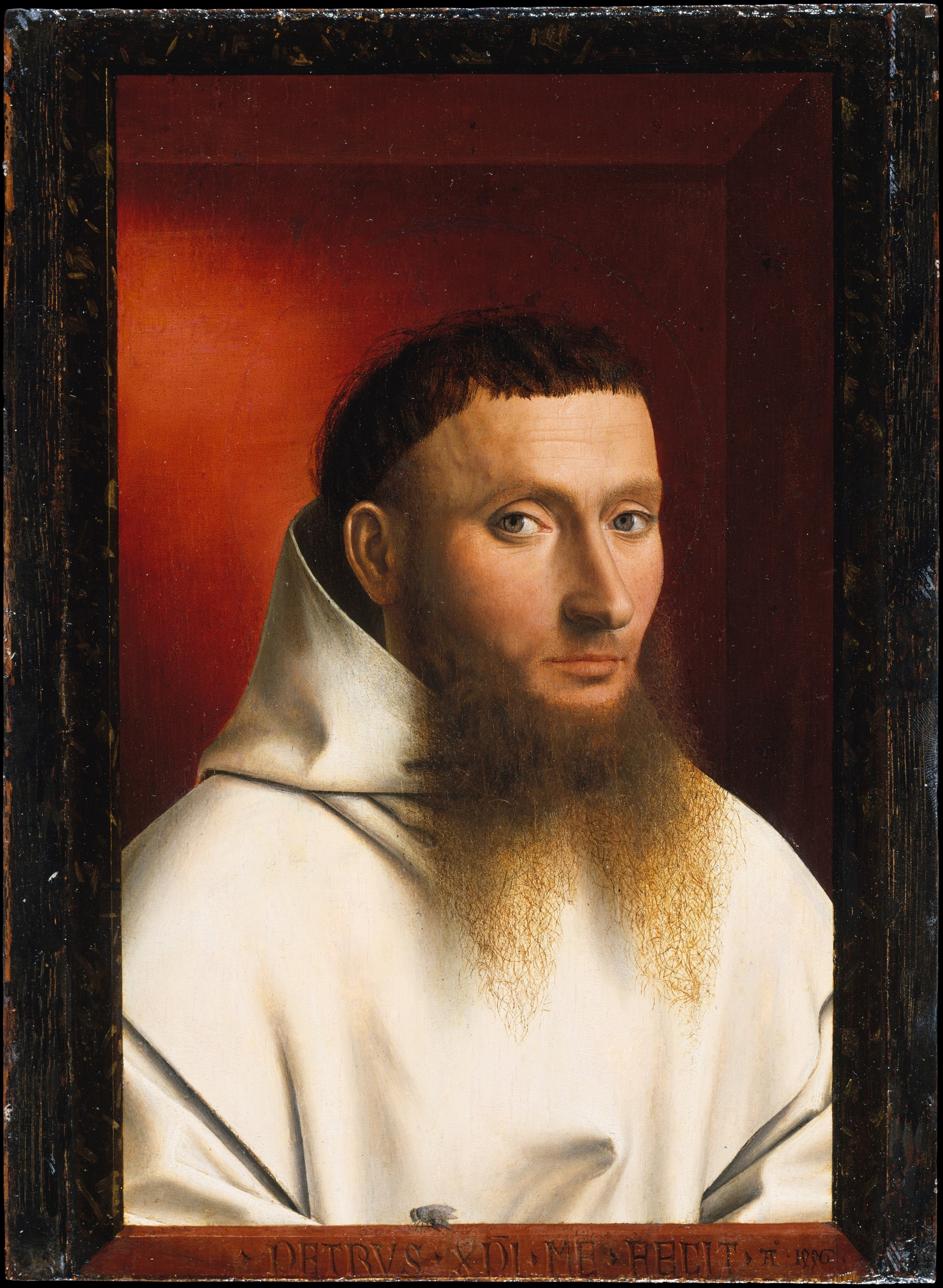
Doctor Ecstaticus (Denis Carthusian)

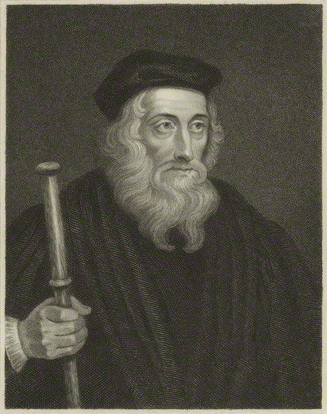
Doctor Evangelicus

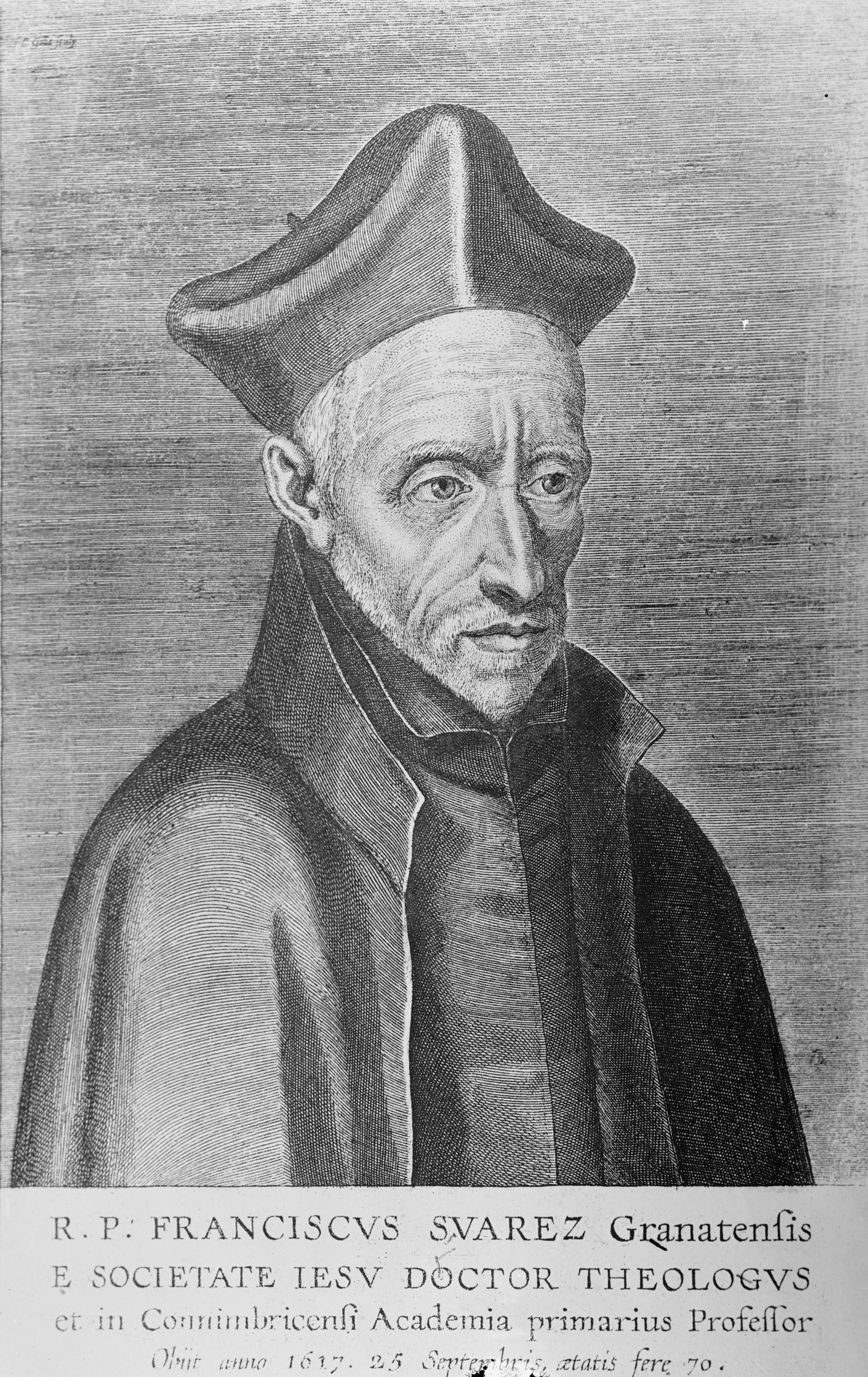
Doctor Eximius

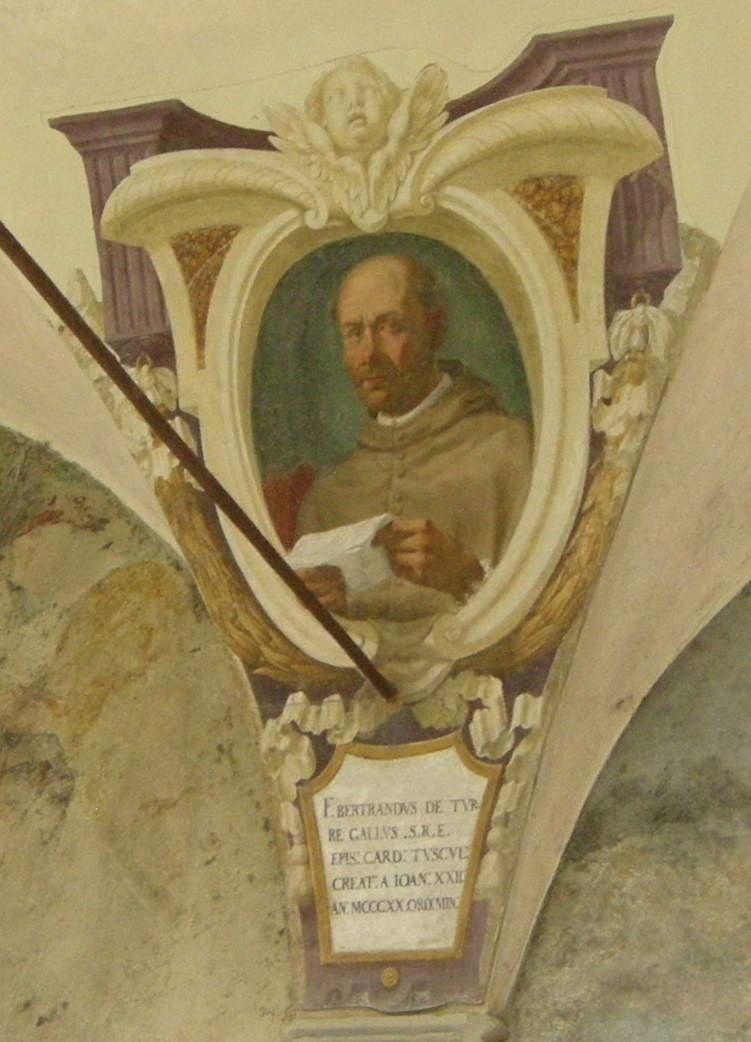
Doctor Famosus

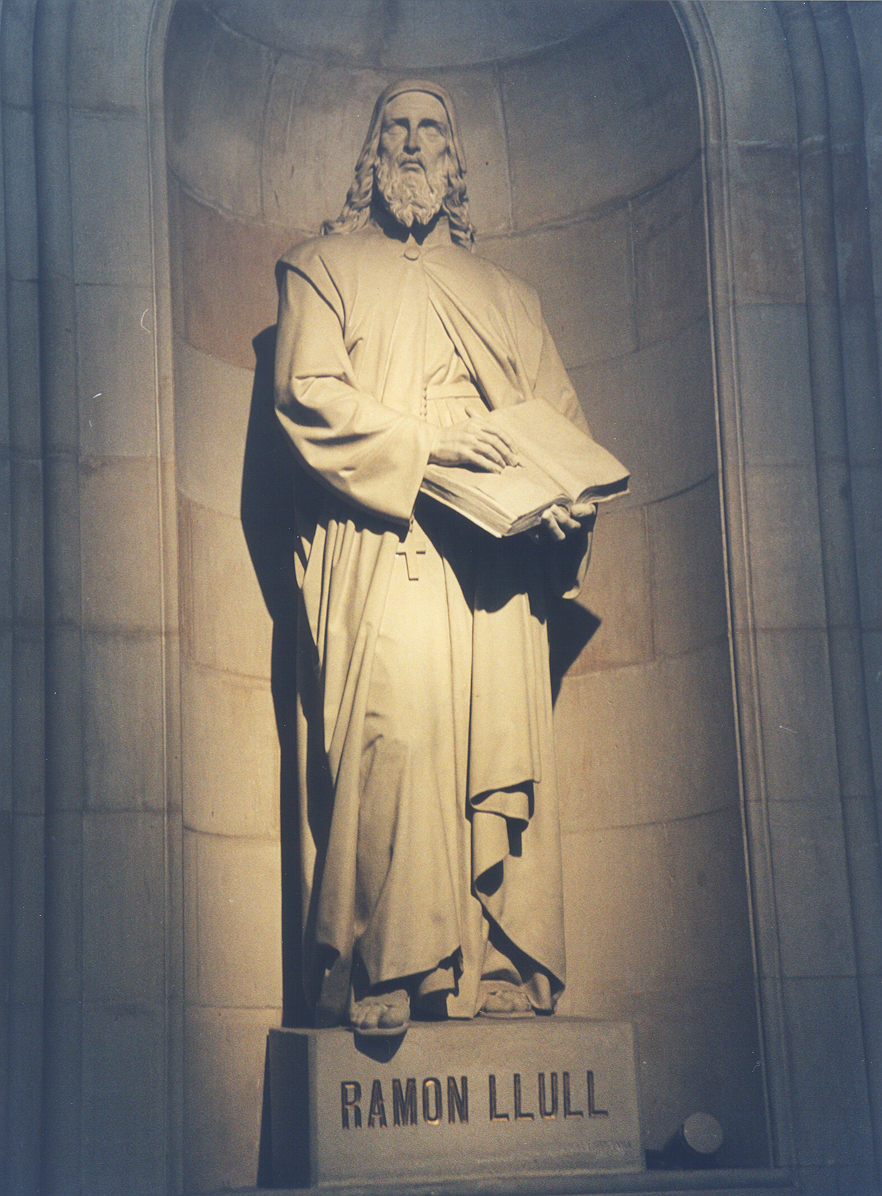
Doctor Illuminatus (Ramon Llull)

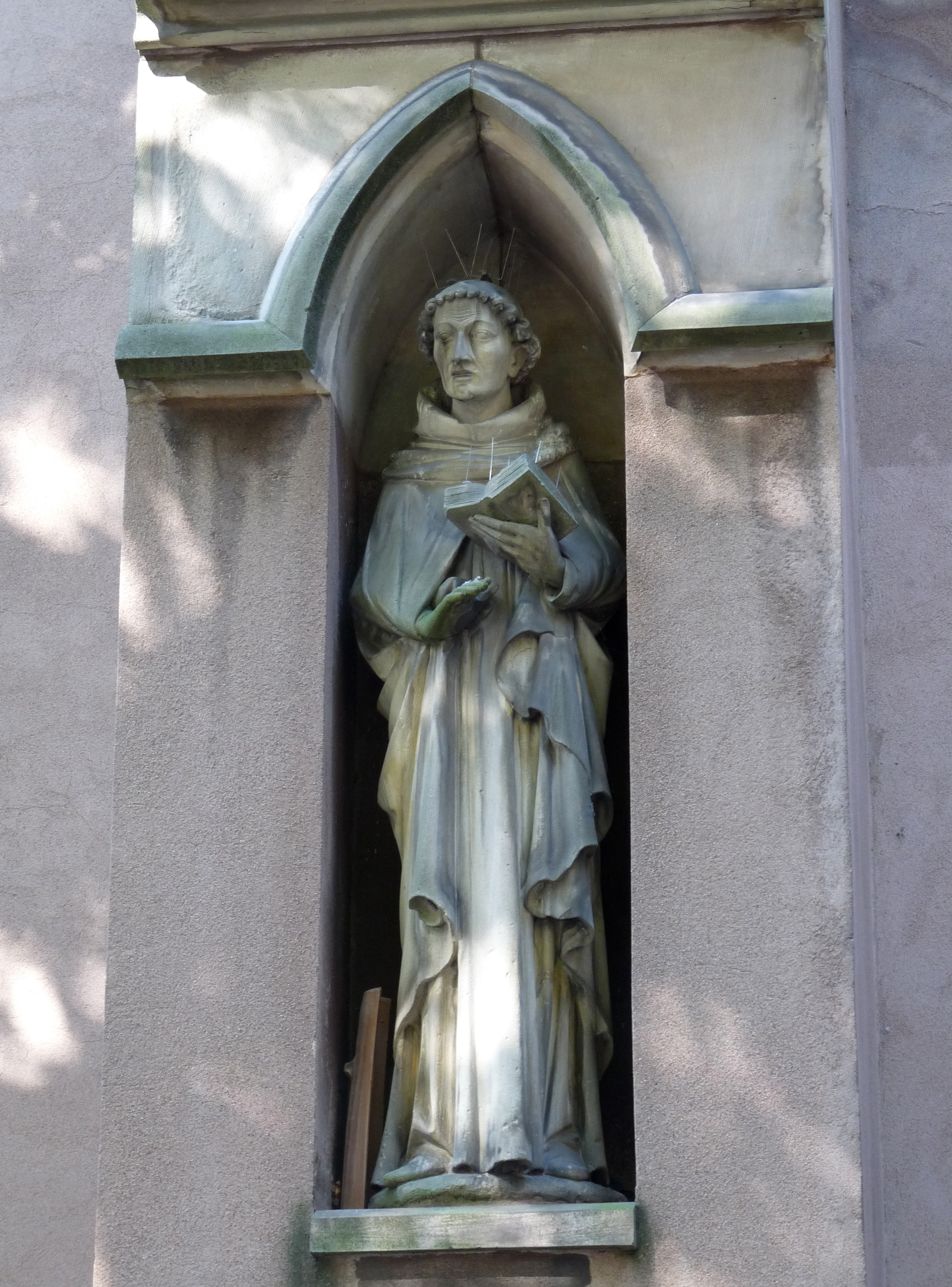
Doctor Illuminatus et sublimis

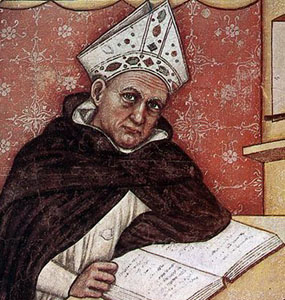
Doctor Magnus; Doctor Universalis

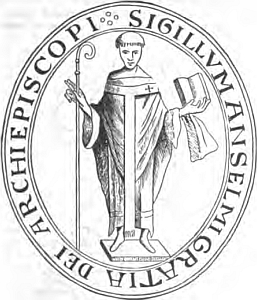
Doctor Marianus

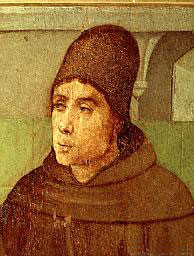
Doctor Marianus; Doctor Subtilis

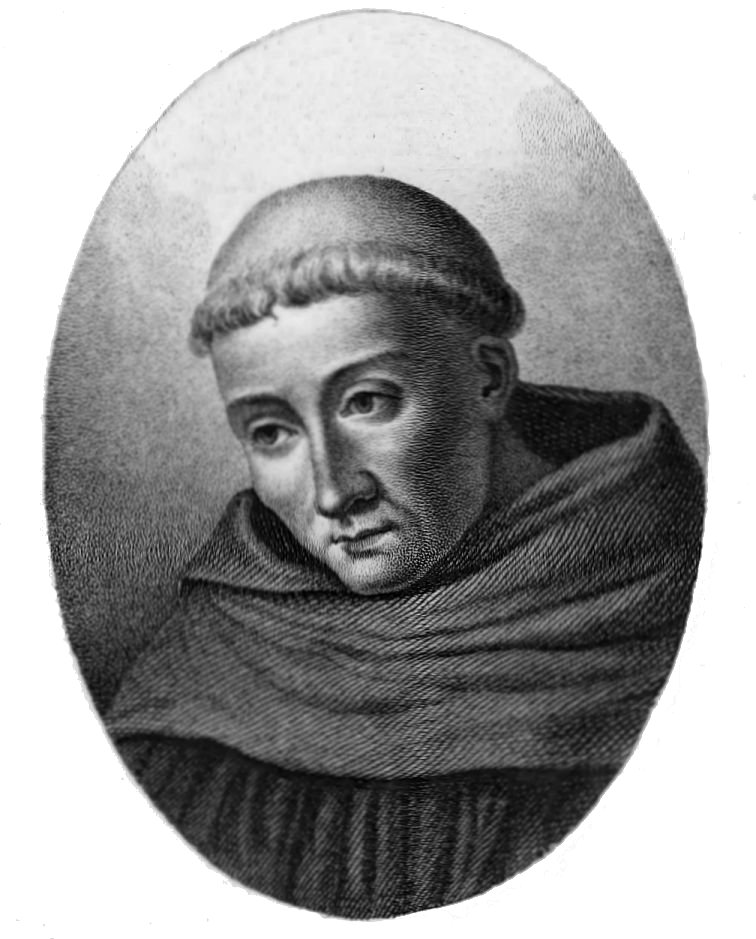
Doctor Mellifluus

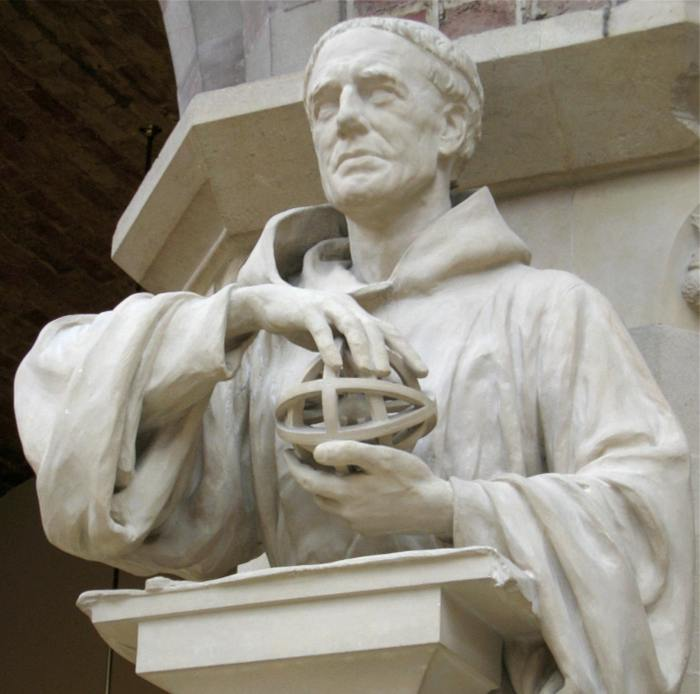
Doctor Mirabilis

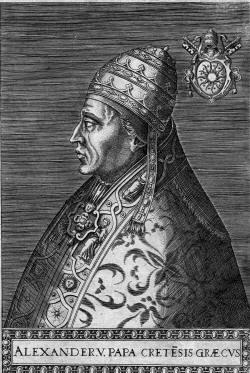
Doctor Refulgidus

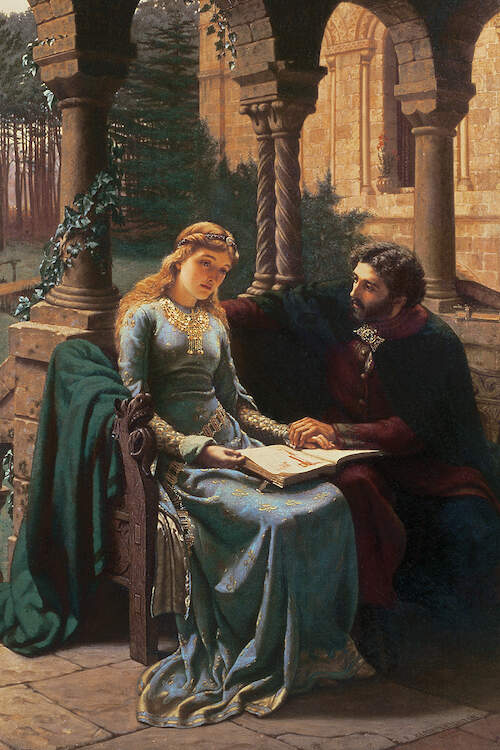
D. Scholasticus and Heloïse

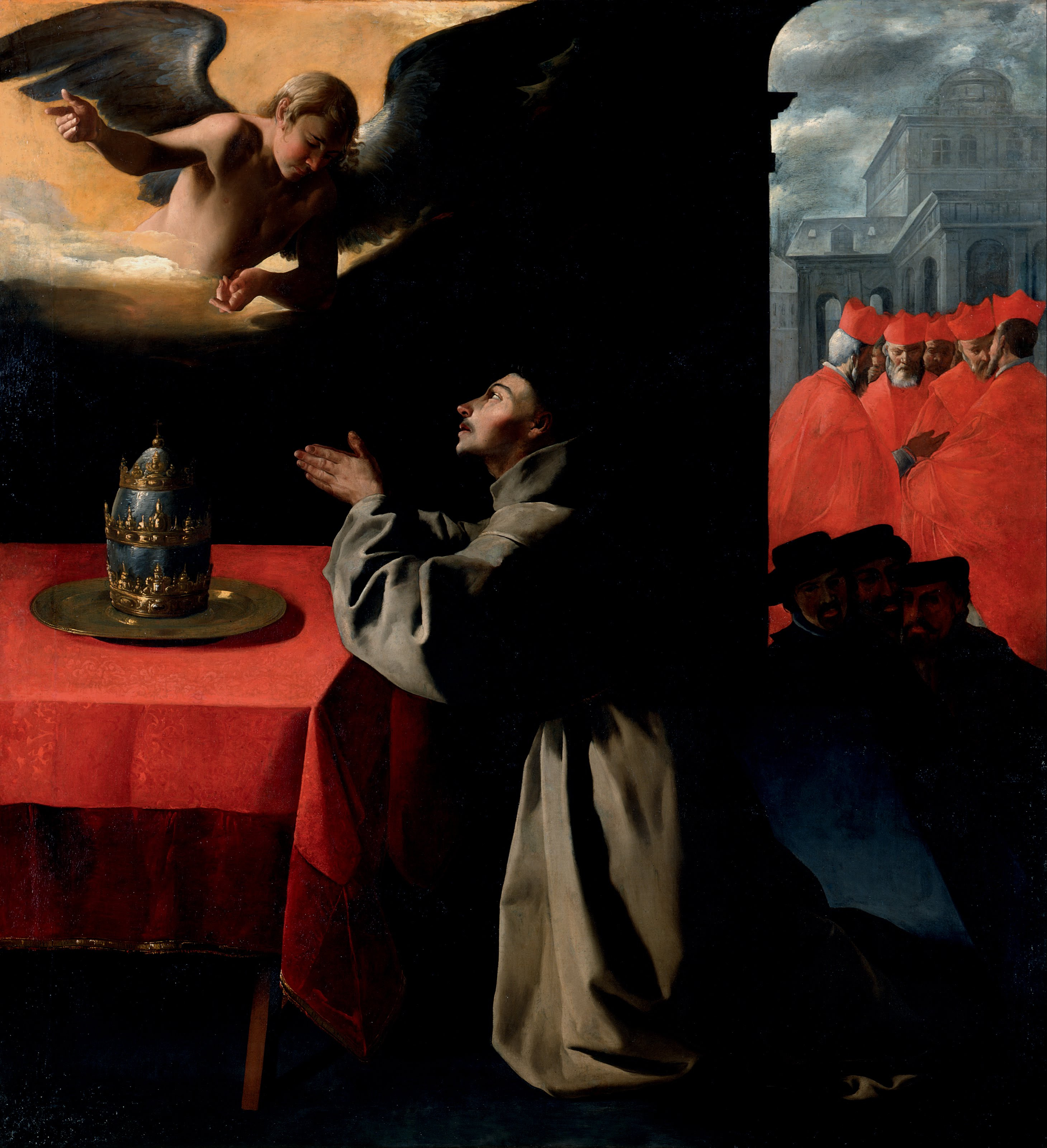
Doctor Seraphicus; Doctor Devotus

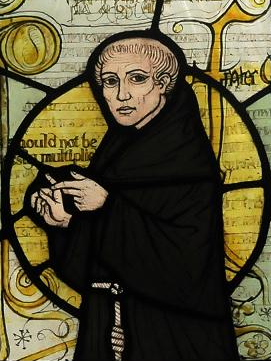
Doctor Singularis et invincibilis

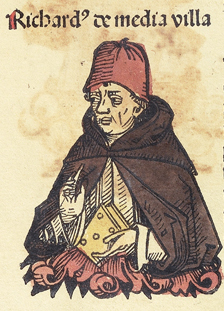
Doctor Solidus Copiosus

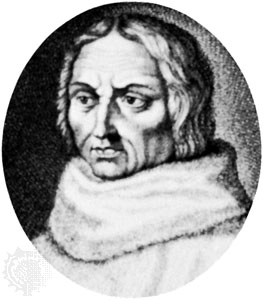
Doctor Venerabilis et Christianissimus; Doctor Consolatorius

It was customary in the European Middle Ages, more precisely in the period of scholasticism which extended into early modern times, to designate the more celebrated among the doctors of theology and law by epithets or surnames which were supposed to express their characteristic excellence or dignity. The following list exhibits the principal surnames with the dates of death.

See also Doctor of the Church and List of Latinised names.

== Alphabetical lists, by accolade ==
=== Doctors in theology ===
Accolade	Name	Religious Order	Death
Magister Abstractionum	Francis Mayron	O.F.M.	1325 or 1327
Doctor Acutissimus	Pope Sixtus IV	–	1484
Doctor Acutus	Francis Mayron	O.F.M.	1325–27
Doctor Acutus	Gabriel Vasquez	S.J.	1604
Doctor Amoenus	Robert Cowton	O.F.M.	1340
Doctor Angelicus	Thomas Aquinas	O.P.	1274
Arca testamenti; Doctor Evangelicus	Anthony of Padua	O.F.M.	1231
Doctor Authenticus	Gregory of Rimini	O.S.A.	1358
Doctor Authenticus	Thomas Netter	O.Carm.	1431
Doctor Averroista; Philosophiae Parens	Urbanus	O.S.M.	1403
Doctor Beatus et Fundatissimus	Giles of Rome	O.S.A.	1316
Doctor Bonus	Walter Burley	O.F.M.	1310
Doctor Christianus	Nicholas of Cusa	–	1464
Doctor Clarus	Louis of Montesinos	O.P.	1621
Doctor Clarus ac Subtilis	Denis of Cîteaux	–	14?? (15th c.)
Doctor Collectivus	Landolfo Caracciolo	O.F.M.	1351
Columna Doctorum	William of Champeaux	O.S.B.	1121
Doctor Communis	Thomas Aquinas	O.P.	1274
Doctor Contradictionum	Johann Wessel	–	1489
Doctor Difficilis	Giovanni da Ripa	O.F.	1368
Doctor Divinus Ecstaticus	John of Ruysbroeck	Can. Reg.	1381
Doctor Doctorum Scholasticus	Anselm of Laon	–	1117
Doctor Dulcifluus	Antonius Andreas	O.F.M.	1320
Doctor Ecstaticus	Denis the Carthusian	O.Cart.	1471
Doctor Eminens	John of Matha	O.SS.T	1213
Doctor Emporium Theologiae	Laurent Gervais	O.P.	1483
Doctor Evangelicus	John Wycliffe	–	1330
Doctor Excellentissimus	Antonio Corsetti	–	1503
Doctor Eximius	Francisco Suárez	S.J.	1617
Doctor Facundus	Petrus Aureoli	O.F.M.	1322
Doctor Famosissimus	Petrus Alberti	O.S.B.	1426
Doctor Famosus	Bertrand de Turre	O.F.M.	1334
Doctor Fertilis	Francis of Candia	O.F.M.	14?? (15th c.)
Doctor Floridus	Guillaume de Vorillon	O.F.	1463
Doctor Flos Mundi	Maurice O'Fiehely	O.F.M. Abp of Tuam	1513
Doctor Fundamentalis	Joannes Faber of Bordeaux	–	1350
Doctor Fundatissimus	Giles of Rome	O.S.A.	1316
Doctor Fundatissimus	Willem Hessels van Est	–	1613
Doctor Fundatus	Guillaume de Ware	O.F.M.	1270
Doctor Hyperbolicus; Doctor Lügner; Reformator	Martin Luther	O.S.A/Prot.	1546
Doctor Illibatus	Alexander Alamannicus	O.F.M.	14?? (15th c.)
Doctor Illuminatus	Francis Mayron	O.F.M.	1325–27
Doctor Illuminatus	Ramon Llull	O.F.M.	1315
Doctor Illuminatus et Sublimis	Johannes Tauler	O.P.	1361
Doctor Illustratus	Franciscus Picenus	O.F.M.	13?? (14th c.)
Doctor Illustris	Adam of Marisco	O.F.M.	1308
Doctor Inclytus	William Mackelfield	O.P.	1300
Doctor Ingeniosissimus	André of Neufchâteau	O.F.M.	1300
Doctor Inter Aristotelicos Aristotelicissimus	Haymo of Faversham	O.F.M.	1244
Doctor Invincibilis	Peter Thomas (saint)	O.F.M.	13?? (14th c.)
Doctor Irrefragabilis	Alexander of Hales	O.F.M.	1245
Doctor Magnus	Gilbert of Citeaux	O.Cist.	1280
Doctor Marianus	Anselm of Canterbury	O.S.B.	1109
Doctor Marianus	Duns Scotus	O.F.M.	1308
Doctor Mellifluus	Bernard of Clairvaux	O.Cist	1153
Doctor Mirabilis	Roger Bacon	O.F.M.	1294
Doctor Mirabilis	Antonio Pérez	S.J.	1649
Doctor Moralis	Gerardus Odonis	O.F.M.	1349
Doctor Notabilis	Pierre de l'Ile	O.F.M.	13?? (14th c.)
Doctor Ordinatissimus	Johannes de Bassolis	O.F.M.	1347 (circa)
Doctor Ornatissimus et Sufficiens	Petrus de Aquila	O.F.M.	1344
Doctor Pacificus; Doctor Proficuus; Doctor Imaginativus	Nicolas Bonet	O.F.M.	1360
Doctor Parisiensis	Guido Terrena	O.Carm.	1342
Doctor Planus et Utilis	Nicolas de Lyre	O.F.M.	1340
Doctor Planus et Perspicuus	Walter Burley	–	1344/5
Doctor Praeclarus	Peter of Kaiserslautern	O.Praem.	1330
Doctor Praestantissimus	Thomas Netter	O.Carm.	1431
Doctor Profundissimus	Paul of Venice	O.S.A.	1428
Doctor Profundissimus	Gabriel Biel	Can. Reg.	1495
Doctor Profundissimus	Juan Alfonso Curiel	O.S.B.	1609
Doctor Profundus	Thomas Bradwardine	–	1349
Doctor Profundus	Giacomo di Ascoli	O.F.C.	1310 (circa)
Doctor Rarus	Hervaeus Natalis	O.P.	1323
Doctor Refulgidus	Pope Alexander V	–	1410
Doctor Resolutissimus	Durandus of Saint-Pourçain	O.P.	1334
Doctor Resolutus	John Baconthorpe	O.Carm.	1346
Doctor Scholasticus; Peripateticus Palatinus	Peter Abelard	–	1142
Doctor Scholasticus	Gilbert de la Porrée	–	1154
Doctor Scholasticus; Magister Sententiarum	Peter Lombard	–	1164
Doctor Scholasticus	Peter of Poitiers	–	1205
Doctor Scholasticus	Hugh of Newcastle	O.F.M.	1322
Doctor Scotellus	Antonius Andreas	O.F.M.	1320
Doctor Scotellus	Peter of Aquila	O.F.M	1361
Doctor Scotellus	Stephanus Brulefer	O.F.M	1497 (circa)
Doctor Seraphicus; Doctor Devotus	Bonaventure	O.F.M.	1274
Doctor Singularis et Invincibilis; Venerabilis Inceptor	William of Ockham	O.F.M.	1347 or 1359
Doctor Solemnis; Doctor Validus	Henry of Ghent	–	1293
Doctor Solidus Copiosus	Richard of Middleton	O.F.M.	1300
Doctor Speculativus; Doctor Gratiosus	James of Viterbo	O.S.A.	1307
Doctor Strenuus; Doctor Proficuus	Petrus Thomae	O.F.M.	13?? (14th c.)
Doctor Sublimis	Francesc Bacó	O.Carm.	1372
Doctor Sublimis	Jean Courtecuisse	–	1425
Doctor Subtilis; Doctor Marianus	Duns Scotus	O.F.M.	1308
Doctor Subtilissimus	Peter of Mantua	–	13?? (14th c.)
Doctor Succinctus	Francis of Ascoli	O.F.M.	1344 (circa)
Doctor Supersubtilis	Giovanni da Ripa	O.F.	1368
Doctor Universalis	Alain de Lille	–	1202
Doctor Universalis	Albertus Magnus	O.P.	1280
Doctor Universalis	Gilbert, Bishop of London	–	1134
Doctor Venerabilis et Christianissimus; Doctor Consolatorius	Jean Gerson	–	1429
Doctor Venerandus	Geoffroy de Fontibus	O.F.M.	1240
Doctor Vitae Arbor	Johannes Wallensis	O.F.M.	1300

=== Doctors in law ===
Accolade	Name	Death
Doctor Aristotelis Anima	Johannes Dondus	1380
Doctor a Doctoribus	Antonius Franciscus	1528
Doctor Fons Canonum	Johannes Andrea	1348
Doctor Fons Juris Utriusque	Henry of Susa (Ostia)	1267–81
Doctor Lucerna Juris	Baldus de Ubaldis	1400
Doctor Lucerna Juris Pontificii	Nicholas Tedeschi (O.S.B.)	1445
Doctor Lumen Juris	Pope Clement IV	1268
Doctor Lumen Legum	Irnerius	1125 (after)
Doctor Memoriosissimus	Ludovico Pontano	1439
Doctor Monarcha Juris	Bartolomeo da Saliceto	1412
Doctor Os Aureum	Bulgarus	1166
Doctor Pater Decretalium	Gregory IX	1241
Doctor Pater et Organum Veritatis	Pope Innocent IV	1254
Doctor Pater Juris	Pope Innocent III	1216
Doctor Pater Peritorum	Pierre de Belleperche	1307
Doctor Planus ac Perspicuus	Walter Burleigh	1337
Doctor Princeps Subtilitatum	Francesco d'Accolti	1486
Doctor Speculator	William Durandus	1296
Doctor Speculum Juris	Bartholus of Sassoferrato	1359
Doctor Subtilis	Benedict Raymond	1440
Doctor Subtilis	Pier Filippo Corneo	1462
Doctor Verus	Thomas Doctius, Siena	1441

=== Other medieval accolades ===
Accolade	Name	Death	Translation/Notes
Apostolus	St. Paul	AD 67	Due to his preeminence among the Letters of the Apostles within the Bible
Commentator	Averroes (Ibn Rushd)	1198	Due to his commentaries on Aristotle's works
Philosophus	Aristotle	BC 322	
Propheta	David	BC 10th century	Due to his authorship of the Psalms
Theologus	Augustine of Hippo	AD 430	
Praeceptor Germaniae	Rabanus Maurus	856	

== See also ==
- Lists of nicknames – nickname list articles on Wikipedia
