= De Montesinos =

de Montesinos may refer to:

- Luis de Montesinos, a Spanish theologian.
- Antonio de Montesinos (Dominican friar), who in 1511 was the first member of the clergy to publicly speak about the human rights of the indigenous peoples of the Americas.
- Antonio de Montezinos, who in 1644 claimed to have found one of the Ten Lost Tribes of Israel living in the Ecuadorean jungles.
