= Medieval accolade =

Medieval accolade may refer to:

- Accolade (also known as dubbing or adoubement), the central act in the rite-of-passage ceremonies conferring knighthood in the Middle Ages
- Scholastic accolade, Latin nicknames for scholars
