= Odo of Lucca =

12th-century bishop and theologian

Odo or Otto, bishop of Lucca (Otto Lucensis), the bishop of Lucca from 1137, was an early patron of Peter Lombard, responsible, as a letter of Bernard of Clairvaux makes clear, for sending Peter to the schools of Paris.

Odo had spent several formative years studying in cathedral schools in the north of France. He had been impressed by the systematizing of theology expressed in the teachings of Anselm of Laon and Hugh of St Victor; his own systematic compilation along the lines of their work, Summa Sententiarum, left incomplete c1138, has survived in about twenty-five manuscripts, eight of which explicitly recognize Odo's authorship: it formed the basis of Peter's compilation.
