= Jacques Almain =

French professor of theology

Jacques Almain (died 1515) was a French professor of arts and theology at the University of Paris who died at an early age. Born in the diocese of Sens, he studied Arts at the Collège de Montaigu of the University of Paris. He served as Rector of the University from December 1507 to March 1508.

== Life ==
Beginning in 1508, Jacques Almain studied theology with John Mair at the College of Navarre in Paris. He received his license in Theology in January 1512 and his doctorate in the same subject in March of that year. When King Louis XII decided to support the 1511 Council of Pisa (or conciliabulum, as it was called dismissively) against Pope Julius II, the University was told to support this assembly. The University chose Almain to reply to a polemical tract by Cardinal Thomas Cajetan, the Pope's most eminent apologist. Almain wrote a trenchant critique of that tract by Cajetan, but did not live to answer the Apologia the Pope's defender wrote in response. Nor did Almain comment directly on the Fifth Lateran Council called by Pope Julius to counter the assembly in Pisa.

== Works ==
Almain wrote in several academic genres. His earliest works were concerned with logic and the Physics of Aristotle. His Moralia became a standard textbook of moral theology, presenting ethical issues in a dry Scholastic style. He also wrote texts discussing portions of the Sentences of Peter Lombard. One text was concerned with the opinions of the medieval Dominican theologian Robert Holcot.

Apart from the reply to Cajetan, Almain wrote on political topics. These works included a discussion of the opinions of William of Ockham about papal power and a disputation on the power of pope and council, his earliest statement of Conciliarism.

Almain embraced the distinction between the absolute and ordained powers of God. His moral philosophy was Aristotelian, arguing for conduct in the middle ground between extremes. His political thought embraced the need for order but allowed a community to restrain any ruler whose conduct had become dangerous to its very survival. Almain's critique of Cajetan's treatise on the papacy argued that Church and State were parallel in nature, both able to act against an errant leader, whether pope or king. All of these teachings are found in the posthumous Opuscula (Paris, 1518).
