= Alessandro Ghisalberti =

Italian philosopher

Alessandro Ghisalberti (Zogno, October 5, 1940) is an Italian philosopher and historian of philosophy.

== Biography ==
After completing his academic training in philosophy, Ghisalberti pursued advanced research in the history of philosophy and theoretical philosophy, with a particular focus on key figures of Christian thought from Late Antiquity and the Scholastic tradition, including Augustine of Hippo, Thomas Aquinas, and John Duns Scotus.He progressed through the academic ranks and was appointed full professor at the Università Cattolica del Sacro Cuore in Milan. During his tenure, he held the chairs of History of Medieval Philosophy and Theoretical Philosophy.

Ghisalberti has served as editor of the Rivista di filosofia neo-scolastica and is a member of several learned societies, including the Italian Philosophical Society (Società Filosofica Italiana, SFI), the Société Internationale pour l’Étude de la Philosophie Médiévale (SIEPM), and the Italian Society for the Study of Medieval Thought (Società Italiana per lo Studio del Pensiero Medievale, SISPM). He has also served on the boards and research committees of various academic institutions.

In addition, he is a member of the Istituto Lombardo – Accademia di Scienze e Lettere.

== Research interests and philosophical contribution ==
Ghisalberti has authored numerous internationally recognized studies, primarily focusing on the philosophical and theological thought of Christian authors from Late Antiquity through the High and Late Middle Ages.

His research engages with a broad range of thinkers, including Augustine of Hippo, Anselm of Canterbury, Bernard of Clairvaux, Hildegard of Bingen, Joachim of Fiore, Thomas Aquinas, Bonaventure of Bagnoregio, Dante Alighieri, John Duns Scotus, William of Ockham, and Jean Buridan. Particular attention has been given to themes such as affective mysticism, prophetic and visionary literature, and the mystical-theological dimensions of Dante’s poetry.

On the theoretical level, Ghisalberti has sought to engage with enduring philosophical questions that arise from his historical investigations into ancient and medieval Christian thought, while also considering the legacy of Neo-Scholastic philosophy.

== Books ==
Ghisalberti's books include:

- Guglielmo di Ockham (1972)
- Giovanni Buridano dalla metafisica alla fisica (1975)
- Introduzione a Ockham (1976)
- Le 'Quaestiones de anima' attribuite a Matteo da Gubbio. Edizione del testo (1981)
- Il Cielo e il Mondo. Commento al trattato 'Del Cielo' di Aristotele (by Giovanni Buridano, translated and edited by Ghisalberti, 1983)
- Medioevo teologico. Categorie della teologia razionale nel Medioevo (1990, 2020)
- Il pensiero filosofico e teologico di Dante Alighieri (2001)
- La filosofia medievale (2002)
- Pensare per figure. Diagrammi e simboli in Gioacchino da Fiore (edited conference proceedings, 2010)
- Mondo Uomo Dio. Le ragioni della metafisica nel dibattito filosofico contemporaneo (edited, 2010)
- Metamorfosi dell’antico in Dante. Dal primo motore al primo amore (2021)

== See also ==
- Philosophy
- Theology
- Università Cattolica del Sacro Cuore
- Middle Ages
- Dante Alighieri
