= Alessandra Beccarisi =

Italian academic

Professor Alessandra Beccarisi
- Title: Professor of the History of Medieval Philosophy at the University of Foggia

Professor Alessandra Beccarisi (born 18/02/1974, Galatina Italy) is an Italian scholar of the history of philosophy whose work relates primarily to the thought of the Middle Ages. She is the Editor of the Bulletin de Philosophie Médiévale.

== See also ==
- Medieval philosophy
- Ground of the Soul
- Alexander von Humboldt Foundation
