= Magna glossatura =

1141 CE commentaries by Peter Lombard

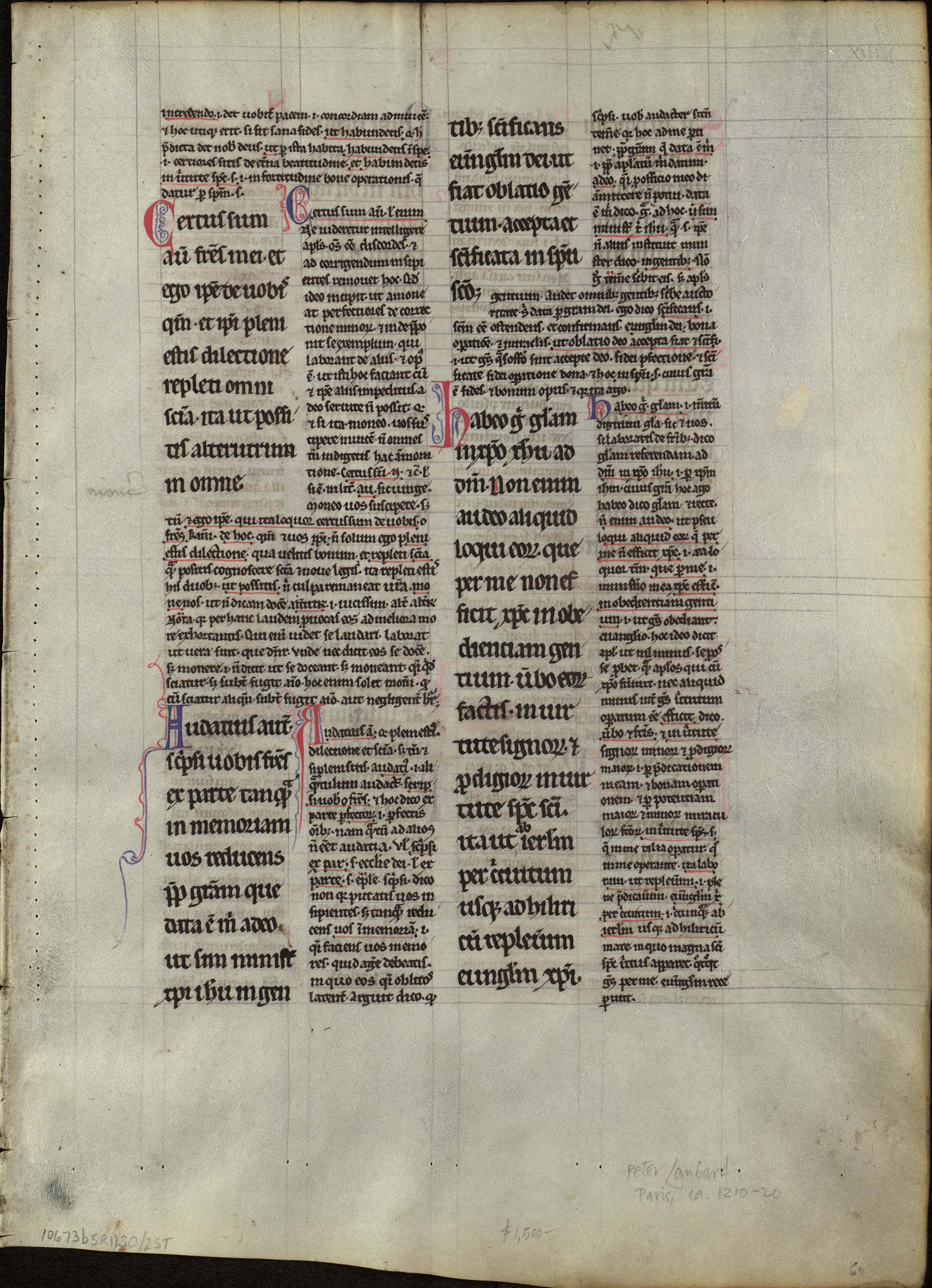
A copy of the Magna glossatura

The Collectanea, or Magna glossatura as it came to be known, is a collection of commentaries on the Psalms and the Pauline Epistles written by Peter the Lombard between 1139 and 1141.

== Origin and characteristics ==
The Magna glossatura is a set of glosses written beside passages from the Latin Vulgate Bible. These glosses were written by Peter the Lombard during his teaching career and before he became the bishop of Paris (1159–1160). His gloss of Psalms and his gloss of the Pauline Epistles (referred to as the Collectanea) were compiled and became a part of the official gloss on the Bible. This collection of glosses would take on the name of Magna glossatura and would, during the 12th century, replace the Glossa ordinaria as the most frequently studied and copied exegetical gloss of the Bible. His other works included the Libri Quatuor Sententiarum (or the Four Books of Sentences) and his commentaries in the glossa Ordinaria. The Magna glossatura, along with other systematic glosses, would have been developed at theological schools such as Laon and Saint-Victor of Paris, and would have been used for the research conducted by theologians as well as the teaching of students in biblical exegesis.

The layout of text in the Magna glossatura, is written in the intercisum (or intercut) format, which was developed by Peter Lombard. It was developed as a way of distinguishing scripture from the commentaries by writing the biblical verses in a larger script and on alternate lines next to the commentary, which would be ordered into columns. Blocks of scripture were then placed on the left edge of the columns to balance the biblical verses with the commentary. The intercisum method, from ca.1160, began to be applied to glosses on all the books of the Bible. This layout also gave glosses and their commentators greater influence in their relationship with the Word of God, as these glosses played a larger role in theological books by forming an essential reading in connection with the biblical text.

Peter Lombard's gloss of the Pauline Epistles features not only commentaries concerning the traditional mode of reflection on the Christian faith, which regards the biblical text as sacra pagina, but also commentaries of systematic theology. As a result, Lombard writes on specific theological themes which deal with issues such as the nature of the Trinity. Lombard's glosses also include references to the works of other ecclesiastical figures and theologians, Ambrose and Augustine to name a few. The biblical commentaries and ideas present in the Magna glossatura are also present in the various sermons given by Peter Lombard to his peers and to his cathedral's congregation.
