= Richard Fishacre =

Richard Fishacre (or Fitzacre) (c. 1200–1248) was an English Dominican theologian, the first to hold the Dominican chair in the University of Oxford. He taught at Oxford and authored the first commentary on the Four Books of Sentences of Peter Lombard to be issued from the Oxford schools. Fishacre wrote his commentary between 1241 and 1245.

According to the Catholic Encyclopedia, he influenced Roger Bacon. Fishacre was himself influenced largely by the works and personality of Robert Grosseteste. He agreed with Grosseteste that man is not essentially a soul. They both thought that light is the medium between body and soul. Fishacre is unique in his belief that the soul is like the modern idea of a ghost.

Another philosopher who shaped the thought of Fishacre was Avicenna. Like him Fishacre thought that the soul and body are distinct substances. The Oxford Dominican accepted universal hylomorphism without doubt. Fishacre was uncertain, as were his Oxford colleagues, concerning the unity or plurality of forms in the soul. Fishacre asserted that the soul shares the form of rationality with angels. He concluded that the word soul indicated something common to the vegetable, sensible, and rational.
