= Sponsalia de futuro =

Medieval European engagement of kids

Sponsalia de futuro (or sponsalia pro futuro, also stipulatio sponsalitia) was a Catholic Canon form of engagement used by medieval European rulers in cases where one or both future spouses were minors. It was seen as a precursor to valid marriage. In order to celebrate a sponsalia de futuro, both children had to be older than seven.

It was Peter Lombard who introduced the distinction between a sponsalia de praesenti and a sponsalia de futuro. While the former, a promise of an immediately effective marriage, created a marriage that could not be dissolved, the latter concerned only a future marriage and as such was seen as a betrothal dissoluble by the mutual consent of the involved parties. It was presumed that the consummation of marriage included the sponsalia de praesenti and thus rendered the sponsalia de futuro a valid marriage.

== See also ==
- Proxy marriage
