= John the Canon =

Catalan philosopher and theologian

John the Canon (Johannes Canonicus in Latin, born Francesc Marbres, first half of the fourteenth century), was a Catalan philosopher, theologian and Augustinian Canon.

== Life ==
John hailed from Barcelona and later became an Augustinian Canon at Tortosa cathedral. Later in life he became a Master of Arts at the University of Toulouse. It is unclear whether or not John himself studied there. He seems to have had advanced knowledge of philosophy of theology, but again it is unclear where he might have completed his studies. It seems John never held any degree in theology.

== Works ==
Only John the Canon's extensive commentary on Aristotle's Physics has survived (Quaestiones libri Physicorum). John's commentary seems to have been inspired by Duns Scotus, who himself never seems to have written an independent treatise on physics. Recent research has shown that John extensively cites other authors in his questions, which makes him a privileged source for the study of fourteenth century philosophy and theology. Among the authors cited are Gerardus Odonis, Thomas Wilton, Walter Burley and Petrus Thomae. In many of these cases, John's treatise, which was moderately famous in his own time, was better known than these author's own works.
