= William of Macclesfield =

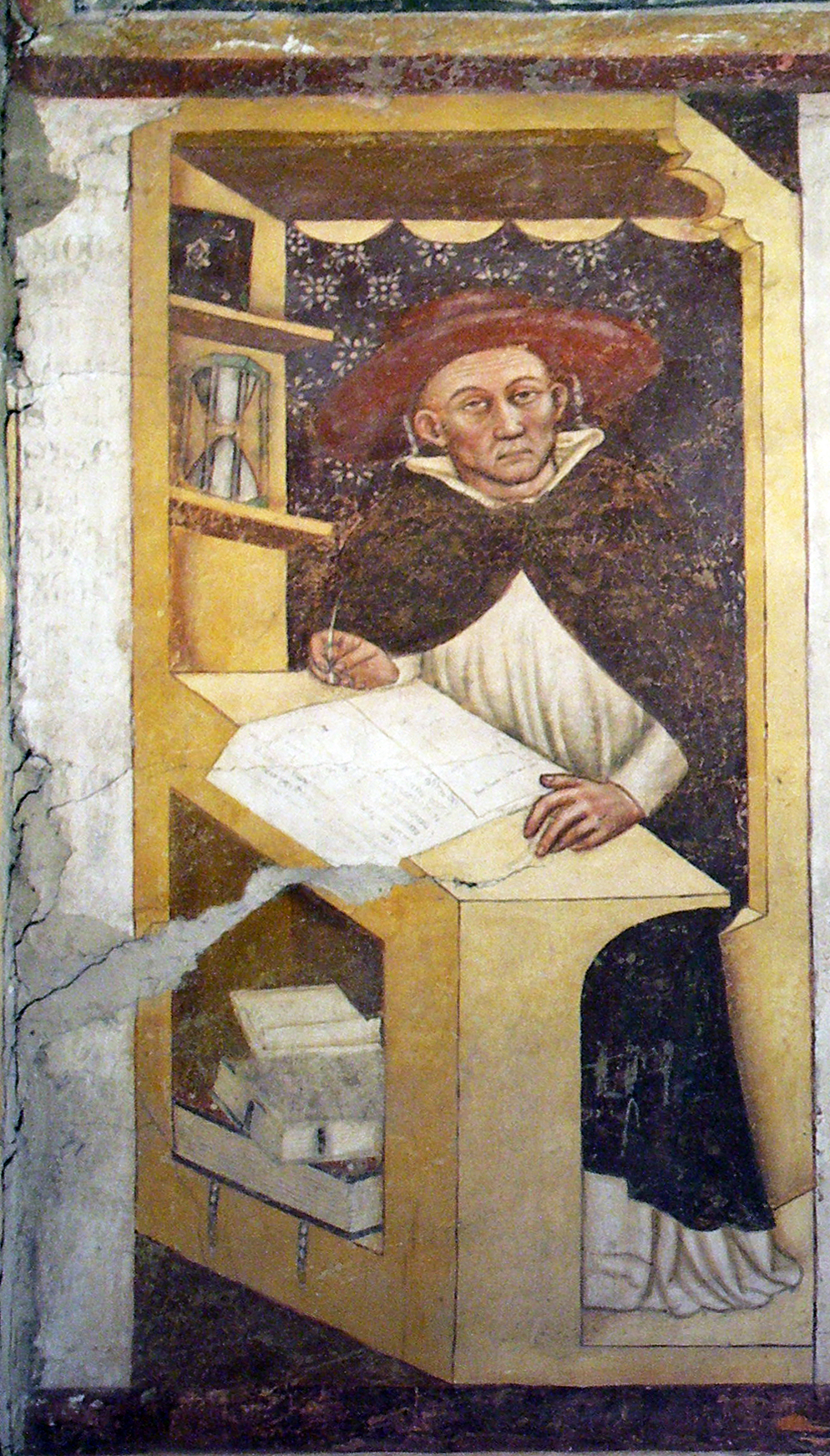
William Portrait

William of Macclesfield (died 1303–04) was an English Dominican theologian, given the Scholastic accolade Doctor Inclytus. He was created Cardinal in December 1303 by Pope Benedict XI; it is unclear whether this was before his death.

== Life ==
He was born, according to the Dictionnaire des Cardinaux, at Coventry, during the pontificate Pope Innocent IV (i.e. between 1243 and 1254). He became a friar-preacher at Coventry and completed his education in the ‘gymnasium sanjacobeum’ (the seminary of the Jacobins, or Dominican friar-preachers) at Paris, where he proceeded B.D. Returning to England he was elected fellow of Merton College, Oxford, in 1291, and proceeded a D.D.

He lectured in Oxford and was an authority on the Bible, taking part also in the controversies of the time and confuting the heresies of William Delamere. In clerical politics he was a disciplinarian.

In 1303 he represented his order on the nomination, it is supposed, of Edward I, at the synod of Besançon. Benedict XI nominated him cardinal priest with the title of St. Sabina on 18 December 1303, but it is doubtful whether the news reached him, as he died while on his way to England early in 1304. Walter Winterburn (died 1305), confessor to the king and also a friar-preacher, was at once made cardinal of St. Sabina in his stead.

== Works ==
The following works are attributed to him by Jacques Échard:

- ‘Postillæ in sacra Biblia.’
- ‘In Evangelium de decem Virginibus.’
- ‘Questiones de Angelis.’
- ‘Questiones Ordinariæ.’
- ‘Contra Henricum de Gandavo, in quibus impugnat S. Thomam de Aquino.’
- ‘Contra Corruptorem S. Thomæ.’
- ‘De Unitate Formarum.’
- ‘De Comparatione Statuum.’
- ‘Orationes ad Clerum.’
- ‘Varia Problemata.’
