= David Luscombe =

British historian (1938–2021)

David Edward Luscombe (22 July 1938 – 30 August 2021) was a British medievalist. He was professor emeritus of medieval history at the University of Sheffield. He was elected a fellow of the British Academy in 1986. He was also a fellow of the Royal Historical Society and the Society of Antiquaries of London. He was the joint editor of volume four of The New Cambridge Medieval History. He was from 1997 to 2002 the President of the Société Internationale pour l'Étude de la Philosophie Médiévale (S.I.E.P.M.). He died on 30 August 2021, at the age of 83.

== Honours ==
In 2014, Luscombe was awarded the British Academy Medal for his book The Letter Collection of Peter Abelard and Heloise.

== Selected publications ==
- Medieval Thought. Oxford University Press, Oxford, 1997.
- The New Cambridge Medieval History, Volume 4, c. 1024–c. 1198. Cambridge University Press, Cambridge, 2004. (Editor with Jonathan Riley-Smith)
- The School of Peter Abelard. Cambridge University Press, Cambridge, 2008.
- A Monastic Community in Local Society: The Beauchief Abbey Cartulary. Cambridge University Press, Cambridge, 2012. (Editor with David Hey & Lisa Liddy)
