= Robert Holcot =

English Dominican scholastic philosopher, theologian and Biblical scholar

Robert Holcot, OP (c. 1290 – 1349) was an English Dominican scholastic philosopher, theologian and influential Biblical scholar.

== Biography ==
He was born in Holcot, Northamptonshire. A follower of William of Ockham, he was nicknamed the Doctor firmus et indefatigabilis, the "strong and tireless doctor." He made important contributions to semantics, the debate over God’s knowledge of future contingent events; discussions of predestination, grace and merit; and philosophical theology more generally.

Modern interest in Holcot has been limited. His influence in the late Middle Ages, however, was clearly great, as is evidenced by the number of fourteenth- and fifteenth-century manuscripts of his work that have survived. For example, there exist 48 manuscripts of Holcot’s Questions on the Sentences (compared to 36 manuscripts of William of Ockham’s Sentences commentary). More impressive are the 175 manuscripts of his commentary on the Book of Wisdom (Lectiones super librum Sapientiae), a work that has been identified as a prime literary source for Chaucer's Nun's Priest's Tale. Holcot was still read in the sixteenth-century when the Parisian theologian, Jacques Almain, wrote a work engaging Holcot's opinions. The commentary on the Book of Wisdom was printed in 1480, and, subsequently, went through many editions.

An edition of the questions on the Sentences was printed at Lyon in 1497, although it contained a cover letter stating that the manuscripts used to produce this edition were disorderly and unreliable. Unfortunately, this remains the only edition of Holcot’s Sentences available today.

Holcot died of the Black plague in 1349.

== See also ==
- Adam de Wodeham
- Hermeticism
