= André of Neufchâteau =

André of Neufchâteau (died c. 1400) was a scholastic philosopher of the fourteenth century. He was a Franciscan from Lorraine, who wrote a number of works. He earned the name Doctor Ingeniosissimus (most ingenious Doctor).

In philosophy he opposed Nicholas of Autrecourt, and also the nominalist Augustinian Gregory of Rimini. On the dependence of natural law on divine will he followed Pierre d'Ailly.

His Sentences commentary was printed in Paris in 1514.
