= Petrus Aureoli =

French scholastic philosopher and theologian

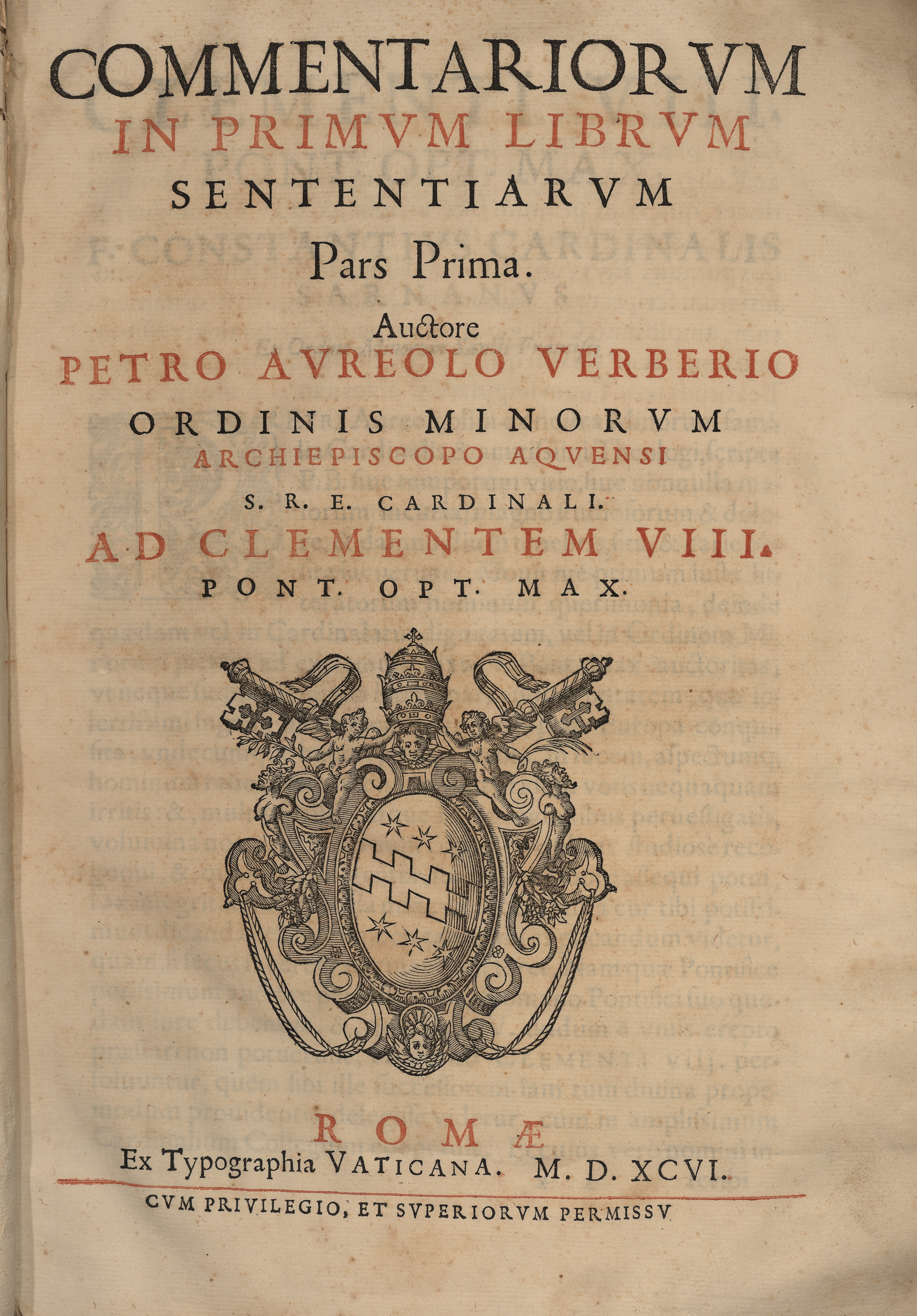
Commentarii in libros sententiarum

Petrus Aureoli (c. 1280 – 10 January 1322), often anglicized Peter Auriol, was a scholastic philosopher and theologian.

== Life ==
Little of his life before 1312 is known. After this time, he taught at the Franciscan convent in Bologna, then at the convent in Toulouse, around 1314. He went to Paris in 1316 in order to qualify for his doctorate, where he read the Sentences. In 1318 he was appointed master of theology at the University of Paris. In 1321, he was appointed by his mentor, Pope John XXII, to the position of Archbishop of Aix-en-Provence, but died not long after in 1322.

== Doctrine ==
Auriol's first work was on evangelical poverty, where he argued for a moderate position between those of the spirituals and conventuals. He is best known for the enormous Scriptum super primum Sententiarum, his commentary on the Sentences of Peter Lombard, which runs to more than 1100 folio pages and was eventually printed in Rome in 1596. He also wrote Tractatus de principiis, a non-theological work, while he was lector at the Franciscan convent in Bologna some time before 1312, and some treatises on the Immaculate Conception at the Franciscan convent in Toulouse.

Auriol was at first a Scotist. Later, he arrived at a position closer to that of the nominalist Durandus. He denied the reality of universals, the existence of species and of the active intellect, the distinction between essence and existence, and the distinction between the soul and its faculties. These doctrines are considered by some to have prepared the way for the conceptualism of Ockham. Ockham was certainly aware of Auriol's work.

His ability earned for him the titles of Doctor Facundus and Doctor Abundans.

== Works ==
- Quodlibeta, Rome (1596-1605)
- Commentariorum in primum librum Sententiarum pars prima et secunda, Rome 1596
- Commentariorum in secundum, tertium et quartum Sententiarum et Quodlibeti tomus secundus, Rome 1605
- Scriptum super primum Sententiarum: Distinction I, ed. E.M. Buytaert Franciscan Institute publications, Text series number 3, St. Bonaventure, NY: Franciscan Institute 1952.
- Scriptum super primum Sententiarum: Distinctions II - VIII, ed. E.M. Buytaert Franciscan Institute publications, Text series number 3, St. Bonaventure, NY: Franciscan Institute 1956.
- De unitate conceptus entis, ed. Stephen F. Brown, in Petrus Aureoli': De unitate conceptus entis (Reportatio Parisiensis in I Sententiarum, dist. 2. p. 1, qq. 1-3 et p. 2 qq 1-2), Traditio 50, pp 199–248.

== Notes ==
Attribution

- Pace, Edward Aloysius (1907). "Petrus Aureoli" . In Herbermann, Charles (ed.). Catholic Encyclopedia. Vol. 2. New York: Robert Appleton Company.
