= Société Internationale pour l'Étude de la Philosophie Médiévale =

Learned society established in 1958

The Société Internationale pour l'Étude de la Philosophie Médiévale (SIEPM) is a learned society established in 1958 to support teaching and research relating to Medieval philosophy. It is based in Louvain-la-Neuve, which is a sub-municipality of the Belgian city of Ottignies-Louvain-la-Neuve (which in turn is located in the Province of Walloon Brabant). Its annual journal is the Bulletin de Philosophie Médiévale and its President is Tobias Hoffmann. Among its former Presidents was David Luscombe.
