= Walter of Mortagne =

12th-century Flemish Scolastic philosopher

Walter of Mortagne (b. Mortagne, Flanders, c. 1100; d. Laon, 1174) was a Scholastic philosopher and Catholic theologian.

== Biography ==
Walter was educated in the schools of Tournai, and studied under William of Champeaux. In 1120, he became a teacher at Laon, where he came into conflict with Alberich of Reims. Between 1136 and 1144 he taught at the School of St Genevieve in Paris. From Paris he returned to Laon and was made bishop of that see.

== Works ==
Walter's principal works are a treatise on the Trinity and six "Opuscula". Of the "Opuscula" five are published in Lucas d'Achéry's "Spicilegium" (Paris, 1723) and the sixth in P.L. (CLXXXVI, 1052). A logical commentary which is contained in MS. 17813 of the Bibliothèque Nationale and which was published in part by Barthélemy Hauréau in 1892 is also ascribed to him. Finally, there is extant a letter written by him to Abelard, in which he expounds the Platonic view that the body is an obstacle to the higher operations and aspirations of the soul.

In his De sacramento conjugii, Walter discusses the sacrament of marriage. He declares that a marriage is effected by the consent of the parties, but adds regarding women, "She who does not at least protest, consents."

== Philosophy ==
On the question of universals, Walter, according to John of Salisbury, was the leader of the Indifferentists, according to whom the universal is in itself indifferent, but becomes the predicate of an individual subject by the addition of various status, that is determinations or, at least, points of view. Socrates, for example, is an individual, a species (man), or a genus (animal) according to the status, or point of view, of the observer. The significant thing about this theory is that it explicitly declares all real existence to be individual existence and implies that whatever unity there is in the universal (specific or generic) is a product of thought. It is, therefore, a protest against the exaggerated realism of the school of William of Champeaux, and, at the same time, prepares the way for the moderate realism which was definitely formulated in the 13th century.
