= Antonio de Montezinos =

Antonio de Montezinos, also known as Aharon Levi or Aharon HaLevi, was a Portuguese traveler and a Converso Sephardic Jew who in 1644 persuaded Menasseh Ben Israel, a rabbi of Amsterdam, that he had found one of the Ten Lost Tribes of Israel living in the jungles of the "Quito Province" (that is, the Pichincha Province) of Ecuador. This supposed discovery gave a new impulse to Menasseh's Messianic hopes. Menasseh wrote a book about this narrative, The Hope of Israel. In it Menasseh argued, and tried to give learned support to the theory that the native inhabitants of America at the time of the European discovery were actually descendants of the [lost] Ten Tribes of Israel. The book was originally published in Latin (Mikveh Israel, hoc est Spes Israelis) and Spanish (Esperança de Israel) in 1650, but its publication in English in 1652 in London caused great controversy and polemics in England.
