= Luis de Montesinos =

Spanish theologian (1552–1620)

Luis de Montesinos (1552 – 9 October 1620) was a Spanish theologian.

== Biography ==
Nothing is known of Montesinos' childhood. As an adult, he joined the Dominican Order and studied philosophy and theology in several Spanish universities. He was known there for both his scholarship and for his piety.

After receiving his degree, he began teaching philosophy at a university level, eventually becoming the foremost exponent of Thomistic theology at the University of Alcalá. Because of his ability in persuading and explaining, he was given the scholastic accolade Doctor clarus. He possessed a singular charm of manner which secured for him at once love and respect. Such was his success in teaching that his lecture hall, though one of the largest in Spain, was too small to admit his audiences.

He taught for thirty years, refusing all honors the church wished to give him. Towards the end of his life, he was beset with blindness, but he continued to teach until his death.

Montesinos is the author of Commentaria in primam secundae S. Thomae.
