= Bulletin de Philosophie Médiévale =

Academic journal of philosophy

- Discipline: Medieval philosophy
- Language: French, English, German, Italian, Spanish
- Edited by: Alessandra Beccarisi

Publication details
- History: 1959–present
- Publisher: Brepols (Belgium)
- Frequency: Annually
- Open access: Yes

Standard abbreviations
- ISO 4: Bull. Philos. Médiév.

Indexing
- ISSN: 0068-4023 (print); 2034-6476 (web)

Links
- Journal homepage; Online access

The Bulletin de Philosophie Médiévale is an annual peer-reviewed open access academic journal of Medieval philosophy with a particular emphasis on unpublished works of medieval philosophy. it was established in 1959 and is published by Brepols under the auspices of the Société Internationale pour l'Étude de la Philosophie Médiévale (SIEPM). Its editor is Alessandra Beccarisi. The journal is abstracted and indexed in Bibliography of British and Irish History, Dialnet, Index Islamicus, International Bibliography of Humanism and the Renaissance, International Medieval Bibliography, Répertoire bibliographique de philosophie, Scopus, and elsewhere. It publishes articles in English, French, German, Italian, and Spanish.
