= Francis of Meyronnes =

French philosopher (c.1280–1328)

Francis of Meyronnes (also Franciscus de Mayronis; c. 1280–1328) was a French scholastic philosopher. He was a distinguished pupil of Duns Scotus, whose teaching (Scotism) he usually followed.

He acquired a great reputation for ability in discussion at the Sorbonne, and was known as the Doctor Illuminatus 'Enlightened Teacher', as Magister Acutus or Doctor Acutus, and as Magister Abstractionum 'Master of Abstractions'.

== Biography ==
Francis of Meyronnes was not only an important medieval French philosopher, but also: a theologian, a student, a teacher, and a minister. He was born (c.a 1288) in Provence, France (located in the southwest region); Meyronnes was probably from a noble family, who were well connected to the house of Anjou. Meyronnes joined the Order of Friars Minor, more commonly known as the Franciscans. He studied philosophy and theology at the University of Paris (c.a 1304–1307) under John Duns Scotus. Meyronnes was considered a Scotist; however, he was more of an independent-minded follower of Scotus. Meyronnes lectured on the Sentences, in Paris, from 1320 to 1321. In that same year, Meyronnes and Pierre Auriol (both Franciscans) engaged in a famous debate with Pierre Roger ("the champion of Thomism" who would soon be Clement VI); the theological questions discussed were taken from the Sententiae of Peter Lombard (a scholastic theologian, bishop, and author of Four Books of Sentences). Robert of Anjou, who was at the time the king of Sicily, requested to Pope John XXII to title Meyronnes as a master in theology. So, on 24 May 1323, the chancellor of the University of Paris (commanded by Pope John XXII) deemed Meyronnes to be a master in theology. Francis served as the Provincial Minister of Provence, from 1323 to 1328. During his Provincial Ministering, Francis actively preached, taught, and served as the pope's ambassador in Gascogne. Francis Meyronnes died in 1328 in Piacenza, Italy, leaving behind an extensive collection of discourses on a wide, comprehensive range of topics. Topics include religion, economics, philosophy, human cognition, politics, the nature of space, and the possibility of other worlds.

He took part in the discussions on the nature of universals. Following John Duns Scotus, he adopted the Platonic theory of ideas, and denied that Aristotle had made any contribution to metaphysical speculation. It is a curious commentary on the theories of John Duns Scotus that one pupil, Francis, should have taken this course, while another pupil, William of Occam, should have used his arguments in a diametrically opposite direction and ended in extreme Nominalism.

== Writings ==
- Scripta super 4 libros Sententiarum (1507–1567)
- De univocatione entis (1490)
- Conflatus (1476)
- Conflatile (1579)
- Passus super Universalia (1479)
- Sermones de tempore cum Quadragesimali (1483)
- Sermones de Sanctis (1493)
- Tractatus de Conceptione B.M.V. (1665)
- Theologicae Veritates in St. Augustinum de Civitate Dei (1473)
- Veritates ex libris St. Augustini de Trinitate (1520)

Francis Meyronnes major work was his commentary on Sententiae. Currently, the final version of Book 1 of the Sententiae, also called Conflatus, shows a very elaborate Prologue. In this Prologue are twenty-one quaestiones, which have made a huge impression on later commentaries on the Sentences. A second famous work by Meyronnes are his Quodlibeta, which in Latin means, "Questions on whatever you like". This presented the opportunity for students in medieval universities to question and test their teachers. Some of Francis Meyronnes' other works include: his dispute over Trinity with Pierre Roger, lectures on the ars vetus and the physics, a treatise on the transcendentals, a large number of sermons, a treatise on intuitive cognition, and other various political treatises.

=== Modern editions ===
- Der Tractatus de transcendentibus des Franciscus de Mayronis, edited by Hannes Möhle, Leuven, Peeters, 2004.
