= List of Franciscan theologians =

This is a list of Franciscan theologians, in other words a list of Roman Catholic theological writers belonging to the Order of Friars Minor.

The entries are arranged chronologically by date of death.

== Old Franciscan School ==
- Anthony of Padua (1195–1231)
- Haymo of Faversham (d. 1244)
- Alexander of Hales (c. 1183–1245)
- John of Rupella (d. 1245)
- St. Clare of Assisi (1194–1253)
- William of Melitora (d. 1260)
- St. Bonaventure (d. 1274)
- Hugh of Digne (d. 1285)
- Matthew of Aquasparta (d. 1289)
- John Pecham (d. 1292)
- Richard of Middleton (d. c. 1300)
- St. Angela of Foligno (c. 1248–1309)

== Scotism and the Later Franciscan School ==
- John Duns Scotus (c. 1265–1308)
- Petrus Aureoli (1280–1322)
- Francis Mayron (c. 1280–1327)
- Walter Burleigh (1275–1337), possibly an Augustinian
- William of Ockham (c. 1288–c. 1348)
- Nicholas of Lyra (c. 1270–1349)
- Peter of Aquila (d. 1361)
- Robert de Finingham (d. 1460)
- Nicolas d'Orbellis (1400–1475)

== Early modern period ==
- François Rabelais (c. 1483–1553)
- Jean Benedicti
- François Feuardent (1539–1610)
- Juan Bautista
- Francis Nugent (1569–1635), Capuchin
- Pedro d'Alva y Astorga (d. 1667)
- Bonaventura Baron (1610–1686)
- Gaudentius of Brescia (1612–1672), Capuchin
- Mathias Hauzeur (1589–1676)
- Francesco Lorenzo Brancati di Lauria (1612–1693), Conventual
- José de Carabantes (1628–1694), Capuchin
- Fortunatus Hueber (d. 1706)
- Martin of Cochem (1630–1712), Capuchin
- Bernard of Bologna (1701–1768), Capuchin

== Modern period ==
- José Arlegui
- Viatora Coccaleo (d. 1793), Capuchin
- Archange de Lyon (1736–1822), Capuchin
- Albert Knoll
- Hilarius of Sexten (1839–1900)
- Gabriele Allegra (1907–1976)
- Giulio Basetti-Sani (1912-2001)
- Thomas Weinandy (b. 1946), Capuchin
