= William Vorilong =

Breton Franciscan theologian (c. 1390–1463)

- Born: c. 1390 near Dinan, Brittany
- Died: early 1463
- Other names: William of Vaurouillon, Guillelmus de Valle Rouillonis

Education
- Education: University of Paris

Philosophical work
- Era: Medieval philosophy
- School: Scholasticism, Scotism
- Institutions: University of Paris
- Main interests: Theology, philosophy of mind
- Notable works: Commentary on the Sentences, Vademecum, Liber de anima
- Notable ideas: Compatibility of inhabited worlds with original sin and the redemption

William Vorilong (c. 1390 – early 1463), also known as William of Vaurouillon and in Latin as Guillelmus de Valle Rouillonis, was a Breton (Note: William signals his Breton origin in the Vademecum, where he calls the commentator Alanus Brito noster.) Franciscan theologian and one of the leading Scotists of the 15th century. He studied and taught at the University of Paris and later served as provincial minister of Touraine. Three of his works survive: a full commentary on the Sentences of Peter Lombard, a reference manual to the Ordinatio of Duns Scotus known as the Vademecum, and a Liber de anima. He is remembered in the history of the extraterrestrial life debate as the earliest Christian theologian known to have asked whether the inhabitants of other worlds would share in original sin and in the redemption.

== Life ==
William was born around 1390, most probably near Dinan in Brittany. He entered the Franciscan order young and passed through the ordinary course of studies, which included lecturing on all four books of the Sentences in one of the French studia. In 1427 he was assigned to Paris to proceed to the doctorate, but he enrolled as sententiarius only in 1429. Paris had been under English control since 1422 during Hundred Years' War. William lectured on the first three books alone. He left the city in January 1431 and he did not return for sixteen years. He seems to have travelled widely in the interval, reaching Genoa and the Council of Basel, and to have gone on teaching. It was probably in these years that he compiled the Vademecum.

William returned to Paris in 1447 and took his doctorate in 1448. At about the same time he wrote his last work, the Liber de anima, at Poitiers. By 1450 at the latest, he had been elected provincial minister of Touraine, an office he appears to have held until 1461. He died in early 1463.

== Works ==
=== Commentary on the Sentences ===
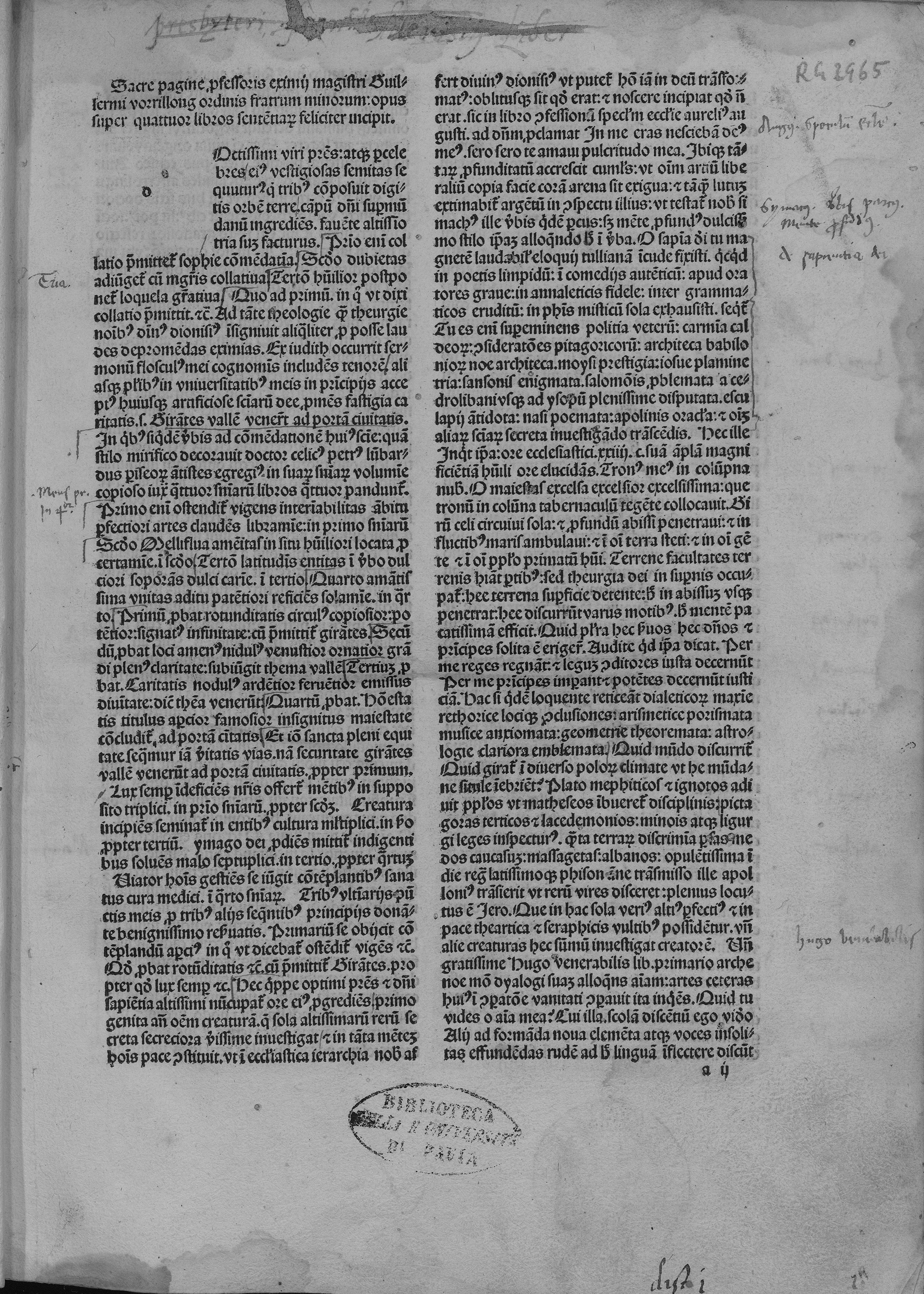
Super quattuor libros Sententiarum Petri Lombardi, 1489

William's commentary survives in a single manuscript and in four early modern printed editions. It is not an ordinatio but the record of his Parisian lectures, which William himself called a lectura. Reviewing it later, he blamed its defects on the upheaval in the city: there was scarcely ever time to write out a lesson, and once he had fled Paris the text was taken from his hands and copied before he could correct it.

William answered his questions by selecting what he took to be the best solution from the earlier scholastic tradition, most often that of Duns Scotus. He drew also on Bonaventure, Thomas Aquinas, Richard of Middleton and a wide range of others. For his clarifications of terms he also cited Cicero, Seneca, Lucian, Cato, Ovid and Juvenal.

=== Vademecum ===
The Vademecum vel collectarium non opinionis Scoti sed opinionum in Scoto nullatenus signatarum is a guide to the Ordinatio of Duns Scotus. William held that the mind grasps the truth more sharply when it knows not only what was said but who said it. The manual accordingly supplies the names behind Scotus's anonymous references to quidam doctor and aliqui ponunt.

In his work, William outlines the structure of Scotus's arguments, notes the vacat and extra passages he knows of, discusses variant readings and tries to restore a legible text, turning to the Reportata parisiensia where his copies of the Ordinatio fail him. He also corrects Scotus's citations where they are wrong, and summarises or quotes sources in full where he judges that Scotus has cited them too thinly. Scholar Ueli Zahnd describes the attitude as almost modern and historico-critical. However, some attributions are wrong, and at several points William names authors who postdate Scotus.

=== Liber de anima ===
The Liber de anima, composed at Poitiers around 1448, was William's last scholarly work. According to Zahnd, it is closer to a psychological encyclopaedia than to a commentary on Aristotle's De anima.

== Plurality of worlds ==
In his commentary on the Sentences, William took up the question of cosmic pluralism. He asked whether a quantitative infinite involves a logical contradiction, whether God could have made a better world than this one, and whether a plurality of inhabited worlds might exist. William concluded that Democritus had been right to posit actual infinite worlds, and thought that infinite worlds more perfect than this one lie hidden in the mind of God.

While earlier writers had confined themselves to God's power to make other worlds, William went further and asked what such worlds would mean for the atonement, original sin and special creation of man. He held that men on another earth would not be born in sin since they would not descend from Adam. They would exist instead through the power of God, having been carried there as Enoch and Elias were carried into the earthly paradise. If Christ died on such an other earth, he could redeem its inhabitants, even if those worlds were infinite, though it would not befit him to go to another world and die a second time.

Grant McColley and H. W. Miller took William to be the earliest Christian theologian they had found who reinterpreted these doctrines to accommodate a plurality of inhabited worlds, while allowing that others had probably preceded him. Michael J. Crowe credits William with being the first writer to raise the compatibility of extraterrestrial life with the incarnation and redemption.

How far William believed in a physically existing plurality is disputed. McColley and Miller argued that in giving a second world a physical place in the cosmos, and providing for the origin and salvation of its inhabitants, Willaim seems to have believed in an actual plurality of populated worlds, treating it as a definite probability. Steven J. Dick is more reserved, taking the appeal to Democritus, the shift of attention to the question of life, and the serious reworking of Christian doctrine as signs of innovations in the Christian tradition, while noting that other worlds were still not positively asserted in William's work.

== Influence ==
William's Vademecum was widely used. An abridged version survives in manuscript, and a similar manual for Scotus's Quodlibeta was compiled in imitation of his Ordinatio, probably by one of William's students. The Venice edition of the Ordinatio of 1497 simply reproduced his references in its margins.

The brevity and clarity of his Sentences commentary earned William the name doctor brevis. Johannes Picardus regularly gave William's position ahead of Scotus's own in his Thesaurus theologorum. In the early 16th century, Johannes Findling lectured at the Franciscan studium of Ingolstadt on the fourth book of the Sentences following William's commentary rather than Lombard's text. Nicolas d'Orbellis also drew on the Vademecum, and Stephen Brulefer relied on William's clarifications of terms and cited him by name.
