= Haecceity =

Term from medieval scholastic philosophy

Haecceity (/hɛkˈsiːɪti, hiːk-/; from the Latin haecceitas, 'thisness') is a term from medieval scholastic philosophy, coined by followers of Duns Scotus to denote a concept that he seems to have originated: the irreducible determination of a thing that makes it this particular thing. Haecceity is a person's or object's thisness, the individualising difference between the concept "a person" and the concept "Socrates" (i.e., a specific person). In modern philosophy of physics, it is sometimes referred to as primitive thisness.

== Etymology ==
The term haecceity derives from the Latin word haecceitas, which was used by the medieval scholastics as a literal translation of the equivalent term in Aristotle's Greek to ti esti (τὸ τί ἐστι)

== Haecceity vs. quiddity ==
Haecceity may be defined in some dictionaries as simply the "essence" of a thing, or as a simple synonym for quiddity or hypokeimenon. However, in proper philosophical usage these terms have not only distinct but opposite meanings. Whereas haecceity refers to aspects of a thing that make it a particular thing, quiddity refers to the universal qualities of a thing, its "whatness", or the aspects of a thing it may share with other things and by which it may form part of a genus of things.

== Haecceity in scholasticism ==
Duns Scotus makes the following distinction:

Because there is among beings something indivisible into subjective parts—that is, such that it is formally incompatible for it to be divided into several parts each of which is it—the question is not what it is by which such a division is formally incompatible with it (because it is formally incompatible by incompatibility), but rather what it is by which, as by a proximate and intrinsic foundation, this incompatibility is in it. Therefore, the sense of the questions on this topic [viz. of individuation] is: What is it in [e.g.] this stone, by which as by a proximate foundation it is absolutely incompatible with the stone for it to be divided into several parts each of which is this stone, the kind of division that is proper to a universal whole as divided into its subjective parts?

— Duns Scotus, Ordinatio II, d. 3, p. 1. q. 2, n. 48

In Scotism and the scholastic usage in general, therefore, "haecceity" properly means the irreducible individuating differentia that together with the specific essence (i.e. quiddity) constitute the individual (or the individual essence), much as specific differentia combined with the genus (or generic essence) constitute the species (or specific essence). But haecceity differs from the specific differentia by not having any conceptually specifiable content: it adds no further specification to the whatness of a thing but merely determines it to be a particular unrepeatable instance of the kind specified by the quiddity. This is connected with Aristotle's notion that an individual cannot be defined.

According to Scotism, individuals are more perfect than the specific essence and thus have not only a higher degree of unity, but also a greater degree of truth and goodness. God multiplied individuals to communicate to them His goodness and beatitude.

== Haecceity in anglophone philosophy ==
In analytical philosophy, the meaning of "haecceity" shifted somewhat. Charles Sanders Peirce used the term as a non-descriptive reference to an individual. Alvin Plantinga and other analytical philosophers used "haecceity" in the sense of "individual essence". The "haecceity" of analytical philosophers thus comprises not only the individuating differentia (the scholastic haecceity) but the entire essential determination of an individual (i.e., including what the scholastics would call its quiddity).

== Haecceity in sociology and continental philosophy ==
Harold Garfinkel, the founder of ethnomethodology, used the term "haecceity", to emphasize the unavoidable and irremediable indexical character of any expression, behavior, or situation. For Garfinkel, indexicality was not a problem. He treated the haecceities and contingencies of social practices as a resource for making sense together. In contrast to theoretical generalizations, Garfinkel introduced "haecceities" in "Parson's Plenum" (1988) to indicate the importance of the infinite contingencies in both situations and practices for the local accomplishment of social order. According to Garfinkel, members display and produce the social order they refer to within the setting they contribute to. The study of practical action and situations in their "haecceities"—aimed at disclosing the ordinary, ongoing social order constructed by the members' practices—is the work of ethnomethodology. Garfinkel called ethnomethodological studies investigations of "haecceities", i.e.,

just thisness: just here, just now, with just what is at hand, with just who is here, in just the time that just this local gang of us have, in and with just what the local gang of us can make of just the time we need, and therein, in, about, as, and over the course of the in vivo work, achieving and exhibiting everything that those great achievements of comparability, universality, transcendentality of results, indifference of methods to local parties who are using them, for what they consisted of, looked like, the "missing what" of formal analytic studies of practical action.

— Harold Garfinkel, Lawrence D. Wieder, Two Incommensurable, Asymmetrically Alternate Technologies of Social Analysis, 1992, p. 203

Gilles Deleuze uses the term in a different way to denote entities that exist on the plane of immanence. The usage was likely chosen in line with his esoteric concept of difference and individuation and his critique of object-centered metaphysics.

Michael Lynch (1991) described the ontological production of objects in the natural sciences as "assemblages of haecceities", thereby offering an alternate reading of Deleuze and Guattari's (1980) discussion of "memories of haecceity" in the light of Garfinkel's treatment of "haecceity".

== Other uses ==
Gerard Manley Hopkins drew on Scotus, whom he called "of reality the rarest-veined unraveller", to construct his poetic theory of inscape.

James Joyce made similar use of the concept of haecceitas to develop his idea of the secular epiphany.

James Wood refers extensively to haecceitas (as "thisness") in developing an argument about conspicuous detail in aesthetic literary criticism.

== See also ==
- Entitativity
- Formal distinction
- Haecceitism
- Hypostasis (philosophy and religion)
- Identity of indiscernibles
- Ipseity
- Irreducibility
- Objective precision
- Open individualism
- Ostensive definition
- Personal identity
- Principle of individuation
- Rigid designation
- Scotism
- Scotistic realism
- Ship of Theseus
- Sine qua non
- Soul
- Tathātā
- Type-token distinction
- Vertiginous question
