= Claude Frassen =

French Franciscan Scotist theologian and philosopher

- Born: 1620; Péronne, France
- Died: 26 February 1711 (aged 90–91); Paris, France

Philosophical work
- Era: 17th-century philosophy
- Region: Western philosophy
- School: Scotism
- Notable works: Scotus Academicus

Claude Frassen (1620 – 26 February 1711) was a French Franciscan Scotist theologian and philosopher.

== Life ==
Frassen was born near Péronne, France. He entered the Franciscan Order at Peronne in his seventeenth year; and after the year of novitiate was sent to Paris, where he completed his studies and remained for thirty years as professor of philosophy and theology. In 1662 he was made doctor of the Sorbonne, and as definitor general, to which office he was elected in 1682, he took part in the general chapters of the order at Toledo and Rome.

Outside of the order his counsel was sought not only by ecclesiastics but likewise by secular dignitaries, Louis XIV, in particular, holding him in high esteem. He died in Paris, at the age of 91 years, 74 of which he had spent in religion.

== Works ==
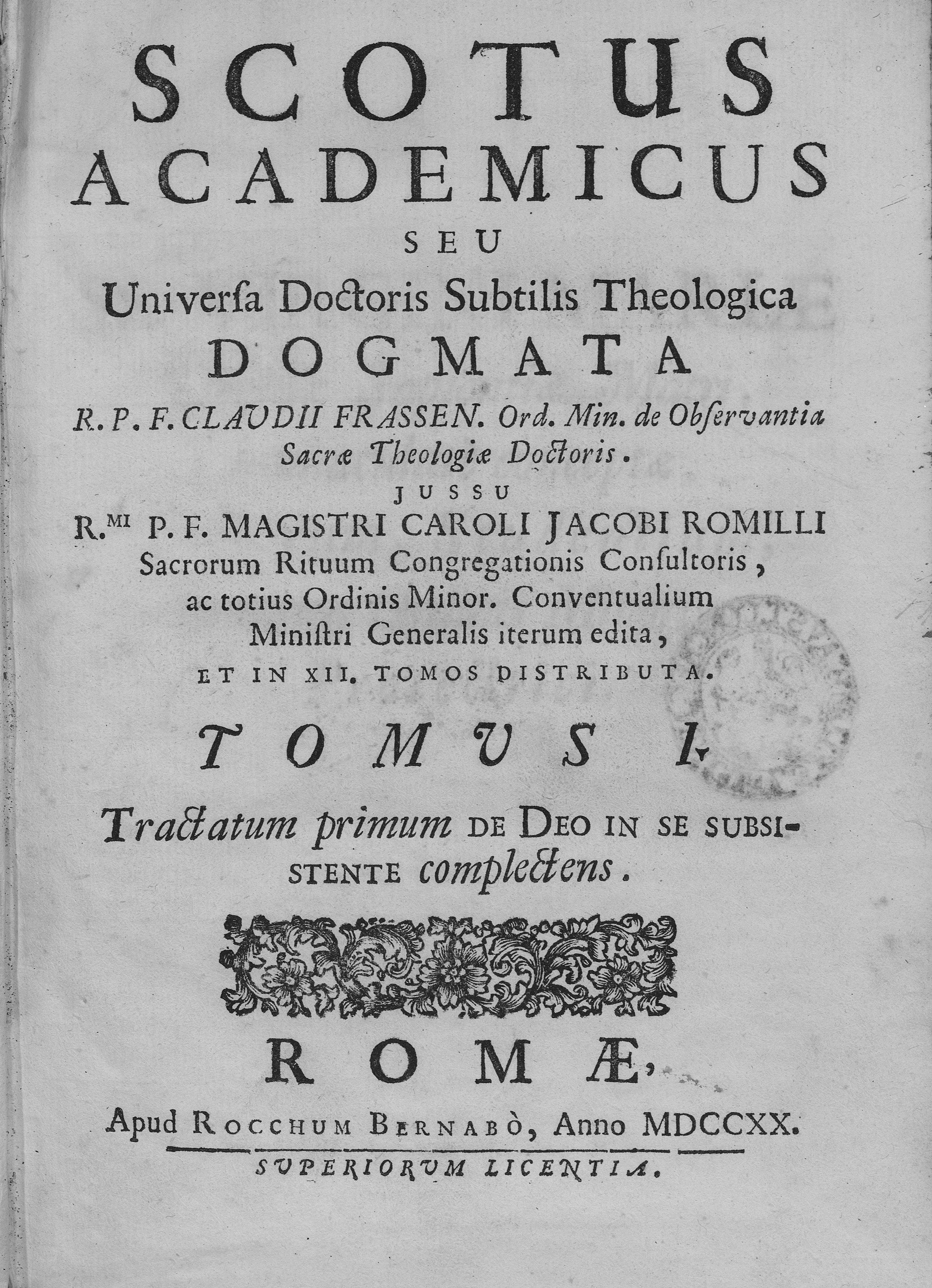
De Deo in se subsistente, 1720

Scotus Academicus (1901) is the best-known of Frassen's writings. The 1913 Catholic Encyclopedia praises its "simplicity of style", "clearness of method", and "subtleness of thought". The work gives a scholarly presentation of the theology of Duns Scotus, interspersed by frequent quotations from the Church Fathers; it also presents a list of controversial issues in scholastic theology. The first volume is prefaced with a chronological list and a brief historical and dogmatical account of the different heresies from the beginnings of Christianity to the fifteenth century. The edition of the Scotus Academicus published by the Friars Minor (Rome, 1900–02, in twelve volumes) was prepared from notes left by the author himself and preserved in the Bibliothèque Nationale of Paris. Earlier editions were those of Paris (1672–77), Rome (1721), Venice (1744).

Other works by Frassen include:

- Philosophia Academica quam ex selectissimis Illustriorum Philosophorum (1786)
- Cursus Philosophiae, Paris (1688), Venice (1767)
- Disquisitiones Biblicae, volume I, Paris (1682).
- Disquisitiones in Pentateuchum, volume II, Rouen (1705)
