= Francisco Macedo =

Francisco Macedo may refer to:

- Francisco Macedo (racing driver) (born 2008), Portuguese racing driver
- Francisco Macedo (theologian) (1596–1681), Portuguese Franciscan theologian
- Francisco Macedo, Piauí, a municipality in the state of Piauí, Brazil
