= Nicolas Bonet =

French Friar Minor, philosopher, theologian, missionary and bishop

His Excellency Nicolas Bonet ofm
- Bishop of Malta
- Church: Roman Catholic
- Diocese: Malta
- In office: 1342-1343

Orders
- Consecration: 27 November 1342 by Pope Clement VI

Personal details
- Born: c.1280
- Died: 1343

Nicolas (Nicholas, Nicolaus) Bonet (c. 1280 – 1343) was a Friar Minor, philosopher, theologian, missionary and bishop of Malta.

== Life ==
Nicolas Bonet was born in the Touraine region of France, where he entered the Franciscan convent at Tours. Nothing is known about his early life. He was incepted as Master of Theology at Paris in the year 1333-4, where he received the title of "Doctor Pacificus" (The Peaceful Doctor) on account of his suave and tranquil mode of lecturing. Bonet took part in the heated dispute concerning John XXII's view on the beatific vision which was finally settled by the decree of his successor, Benedict XII, "Benedictus Deus".

He was a member of the papal embassy tasked by Benedict XII to prepare a diplomatic mission to Kublai Khan, in response to the khan's petition to Benedict XII for new labourers in the Franciscan missions of Asia. The pope tasked four Franciscans: John of Florence, afterwards Bishop of Bisignano in Calabria, Nicholas Bonet, Nicholas of Molano, and Gregory of Hungary. The delegates, bearing letters from the pope to the khan, left Avignon towards the end of the year 1338 and returned to Avignon in 1354. Bonet did not join the mission himself, because he was consecrated Bishop of Malta by Pope Clement VI on November 27, 1342. It is assumed that Nicolas died in 1343, since the bull appointing his successor mentions his death.

== Works ==
All four of Nicolas's surviving works have been printed in the sixteenth century. They are his Metaphysica, Philosophia Naturalis, Praedicamenta and Theologia Naturalis.

Older histories mention some other works, including a treatise on the formal distinction and his commentary on Peter Lombard's Sentences. Since none of these works survive, their attribution is uncertain.

== Philosophy ==
Metaphysics

Most of Nicolas's metaphysics is contained in his Metaphysica. Unlike many of his predecessors and contemporaries, Nicolas did not simply write a commentary on Aristotle's Metaphysics. Instead, he opted to provide a systematic order to his Metaphysica, departing from the most general principles and working towards specifics. His main sources of inspiration for doing so were Aristotle himself and Avicenna. It has therefore been argued that Nicolas's Metaphysica was the first systematic treatise on metaphysics, preceding Francisco Suárez by multiple centuries. Many of the topics discussed belong to the core of Scotist metaphysics and medieval metaphysics in general: the formal distinction, the subject of metaphysics, the object of the intellect and the different properties of being. Recent scholarship has drawn attention to whether or not his metaphysics can be seen as a supertranscendental science and Nicolas's conception of unity.

Natural philosophy

Both Nicolas's Praedicamenta and Philosophia Naturalis contain an atomistic account of nature, a view Nicolas shared with Gerardus Odonis.

== Bibliography ==
- Cusack, St. Francis and the Franciscans (New York, 1867), XIV, 470-472.
- Da Civezza, Storia delle missioni Francescane (Rome, 1859), III, xv, 599-617.
- De Gubernatis, De missionibus antiquis (Rome, 1689), I, 399; Analecta Franciscana (Quaracchi, 1887), II, 178.
- Sbaralea, Suppl. et casting. ad script. ord. min., 552.
- Wadding, L, Annales Minorum, VII, 213-219.
