= Nicolas d'Orbellis =

French Franciscan theologian and philosopher

Nicolas d'Orbellis was a French Franciscan theologian and philosopher, of the Scotist school.

== Biography ==
He was born about 1400. He seems to have entered the monastery of the Observantines, founded in 1407, one of the first in France.

He appears to have been professor of theology and philosophy in the University of Angers, where he enjoyed great reputation as an expounder of the teaching of John Duns Scotus. After 1465 he wrote his chief work, a commentary on the Four Books of Sentences.

He died at Rome in 1475 and was interred in the church of the Ara Coeli on the Capitoline. Under the entry for the word Dorbel, the Oxford English Dictionary gives the date of his death as 1455. The meaning of Dorbel (based on the name of Nicholas de Orbellis) is given as: a scholastical pedant, a dull-witted person, dolt.

== Writings ==
His chief works are:

- "Expositio in IV Sententiarum Libros", a compilation based on the teachings of John Duns Scotus, published first at Rouen without date or place (s.l. et a.) and then at Rouen without the year (s. a.); at Paris, twice in 1488, again in 1499, 1511 and 1517; at Lyons, 1503; at Hagenau, 1503; Venice, 1507;
- "Expositio in XII Libros Metaphysicae Aristotelis secundum viam Scoti" (Bologna, 1485; Paris, 1505) on Aristotelian Metaphysics;
- "Expositio Logicae secundum Doctrinam Doctoris Subtilis Scoti" (Parma, 1482; Basle, 1494; Venice, 1507) on logic, as the following work;
- "Logicae Summula", with passages from Francis of Mayron, Antonio Andrea, Bonetus and Scotus (Venice, 1489 and 1500).
- "Compendium Mathematicum", appeared without place or date (about 1485) (Bologna, 1485), on Mathematics like the following;
- "De Scientia Mathematica, Physica" etc. (Basle, 1494 and 1503).
