= Antonius Andreas =

Spanish Franciscan theologian (c.1280–1320

Antonius Andreas (c. 1280 in Tauste, Aragon – 1320) was a Spanish Franciscan and Scotist theologian, a pupil of Duns Scotus.

He was teaching at the University of Lleida in 1315. He was nicknamed Doctor Dulcifluus, or Doctor Scotellus (applied as well to Peter of Aquila).

His Quaestiones super XII libros Metaphysicae Aristotelis was printed in 1481.

== Bibliography ==
- Marek Gensler, "The making of Doctor Dulcifluus. Antonius Andreae's contribution to the formation of Scotism", Anuari de la Societat Catalana de Filosofia, 1996, pp. 57–67.
