= Paolini =

Paolini is an Italian surname. Notable people with the surname include:

- Brinson Paolini (born 1991), American professional golfer
- Cesare Paolini (1937–1983), Italian architect
- Christopher Paolini (born 1983), American fantasy and science-fiction writer
- Diego Paolini (active 1999-2013), Italian slalom canoer
- Enrico Paolini (1945–2025), Italian racing cyclist
- Gabriele Paolini (born 1974), Italian television prankster and condom advocate
- Giulio Paolini (born 1940), Italian sculptor
- Jasmine Paolini (born 1996), Italian tennis player
- Jean Paolini (1921–2015), French civil servant, prefect of police of Paris
- Lauren Paolini (born 1987), American female volleyball player
- Luca Paolini (born 1977), Italian professional road bicycle racer
- Marco Paolini (born 1956), Italian stage actor, theatre director, dramaturge and author
- Marco Paolini (footballer) (born 1995), Italian footballer
- Pietro Paolini (1603–1681), Italian painter of the Baroque era
- Pio Fabio Paolini or Pio Paolini (1620–1692), Italian painter of the Baroque period
