= Peter of Aquila =

Italian Friar Minor, theologian and bishop

Peter "Scotellus" of Aquila (or Peter of Tornimparte; d. 1361) was an Italian Friar Minor, theologian and bishop.

Peter was born at L'Aquila in the Abruzzo, Italy, towards the end of the 13th century. In 1334 he figures as a Master of Theology and as Minister Provincial of his Order for Tuscany. In 1334 he was appointed confessor to Queen Joan I of Naples and shortly afterwards Inquisitor for Florence. His servants having been punished by public authority, the Inquisitor excommunicated the priors and placed the town under interdict.

On 12 February 1347, Peter was named Bishop of S. Angelo de Lombardi in Calabria, and, on 30 May 1348, was transferred to the Diocese of Trivento, where he remained until the end of his life.

He was an able interpreter of John Duns Scotus, and was called Doctor Sufficiens. His chief works are commentaries on the four books of Sentences, which being a compendium of the doctrine of Scotus were called Scotellum, whence the author's nickname "Scotellus". The commentaries have passed through various editions, the first by Peter Drach, at Speier, 1480, and by Paolini (Genoa, 1907–09).

== Sources ==
- Eubel, Bullarium Franciscanum, VI (Rome, 1902), 192, 214
- Analecta Franciscana, IV (Quaracchi, 1906), 339, 530
- Luke Wadding, Annales Minorum, ad a. 1343, n. 35; ad a. 1346, nn, 4, 5
- Wadding, Scriptores Ord. Min. (Rome, 1806), 187
- Sbaralea, Supplem. Ad Script. Ord. Min. (Rome, 1806), 583
- Giammaria Mazzucchelli, Gli scrittori d'Italia, II (Brescia, 1753), 902-3
- Cappalletti, Le chiese d'Italia, XX (Venice, 1866), 551.
- The Cambridge History of Medieval Philosophy. Volume 2. Cambridge: CUP 2010., p. 940.
- Brown, Stephen F.; Juan Carlos Flores (2010). Historical Dictionary of Medieval Philosophy and Theology. 2nd edition. Latham MD: Rowman & Littlefield/Bloomsbury Pub. 2018. P. 241.

=== External links ===
- Petrus de Aquila (de Aquileia, Scotellus/doctor sufficiens, d. 1361) from FRANCISCAN AUTHORS, 13TH - 18TH CENTURY: A CATALOGUE IN PROGRESS, Bert Roest and Maarten van der Heijden
- Peter of Aquila - Catholic Encyclopedia article
- Stephan Meier-Oeser (1994). "Petrus de Aquila, O.F.M., (»Scotellus«, di Tornimparte)". In Bautz, Traugott (ed.). Biographisch-Bibliographisches Kirchenlexikon (BBKL) (in German). Vol. 7. Herzberg: Bautz. cols. 333–334. ISBN 3-88309-048-4.
