= Daniel Horan =

American Catholic academic and theologian (born 1983)

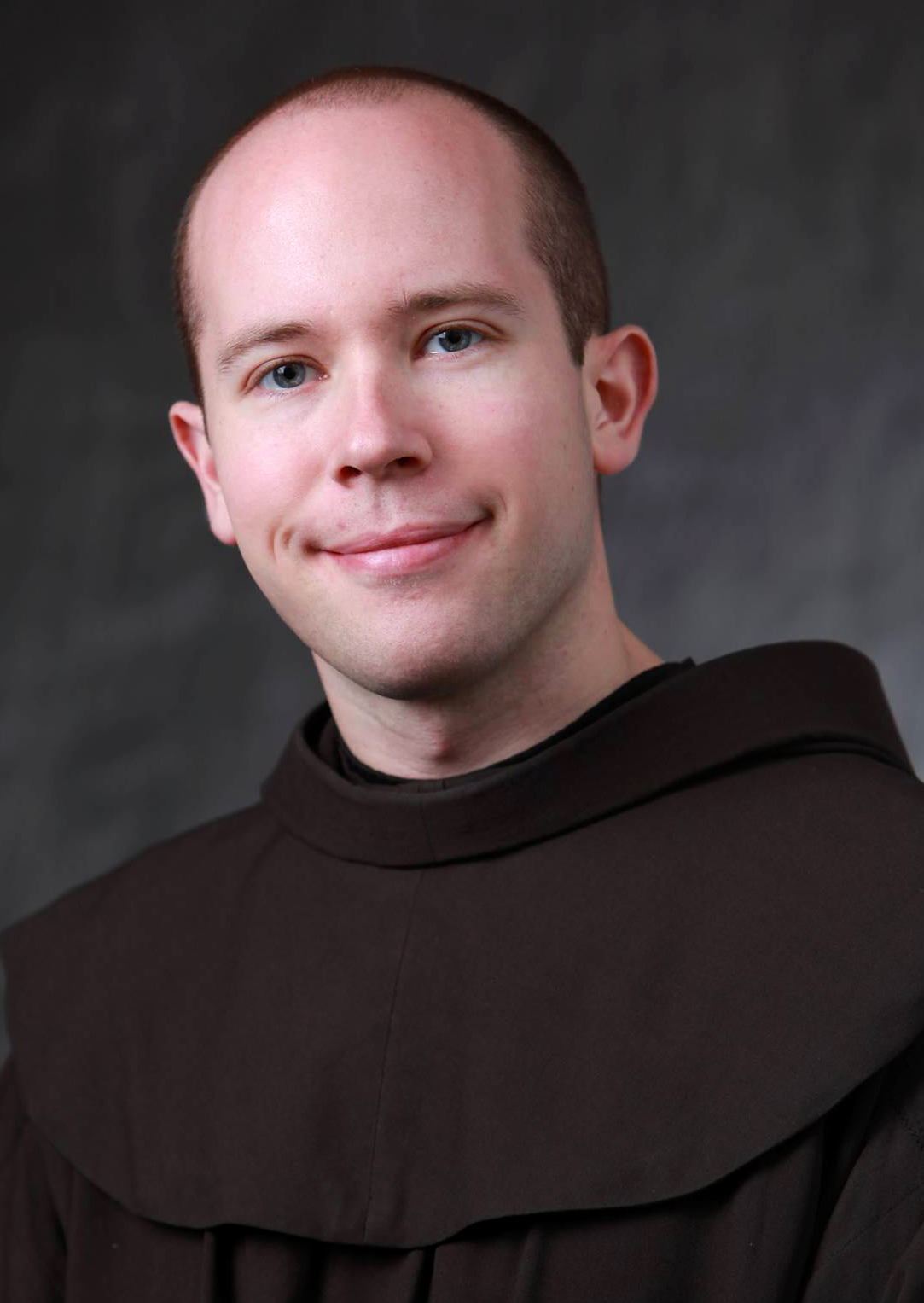
- Born: November 15, 1983 (age 42); Pensacola, Florida, U.S.
- Occupations: theologian; author
- Years active: 2007–present

Orders
- Ordination: May 19, 2012 by Theodore McCarrick
- Laicized: Announced petition on October 3, 2024

Academic background
- Education: St. Bonaventure University; Washington Theological Union; Boston College
- Thesis: Imagining Planetarity (2016)
- Doctoral advisor: Brian Robinette
- Influences: John Duns Scotus

Academic work
- Discipline: Theology
- Sub-discipline: Systematic theology
- School or tradition: Scotism
- Institutions: Saint Mary's College (Indiana)
- Website: danhoran.com

Daniel Patrick Horan (born 1983) is an American Catholic theologian, author and former Franciscan priest. He is currently the director of the Center for the Study of Spirituality and professor of Philosophy, Religious Studies, and Theology at Saint Mary's College in Notre Dame, Indiana. He is also affiliated Professor of Spirituality at the Oblate School of Theology in San Antonio, Texas. He previously held the Duns Scotus Chair of Spirituality at Catholic Theological Union in Chicago, and taught at several other academic institutions. He is a columnist for National Catholic Reporter.

== Early life and education ==
Horan was born on November 15, 1983, in Pensacola, Florida. He studied theology and journalism at St. Bonaventure University from 2001 to 2005. Horan entered the Order of Friars Minor in 2005, taking first vows in 2007. He earned a Master of Arts in systematic theology in 2010 and a Master of Divinity in 2012 at the Washington Theological Union. He was ordained a priest on May 19, 2012 by Cardinal Theodore McCarrick. He earned a Doctor of Philosophy degree in systematic theology from Boston College in 2016.

== Career ==
Horan taught in the Department of Religious Studies at Siena College in Loudonville, New York, and summer courses in the Department of Theology at St. Bonaventure University, the School of Theology and Ministry at Boston College, and at Catholic Theological Union. He serves on the Board of Trustees of St. Bonaventure University and the Board of Regents of Franciscan School of Theology. He previously served several terms on the International Thomas Merton Society Board of Directors and is a former columnist at America.

Horan has written on Franciscan theology, philosophy, and spirituality as well as given lectures and delivered academic papers (around the United States, Canada, and Europe) on the theological and social significance of the work of Thomas Merton. He has also given workshops and delivered lectures on the intersection of the millennial generation and spirituality. His current work focuses on postmodern thought and the use of medieval Franciscan thinkers like John Duns Scotus as well as the authentic retrieval of their thought for contemporary theological inquiry; the life, work and thought of Thomas Merton; and contemporary systematic and constructive theologies.

Horan has spoken publicly on theological matters related to justice and inclusion in support of the LGBTQ+ community in the Catholic Church and society, including offering scholarly supported criticism of USCCB statements. Additionally, Horan has advocated for a number of other justice issues in academic and popular venues, including in response to the global climate crisis, ecospirituality, and antiracism.

On October 3, 2024, Horan announced that he would be leaving the Franciscan order and ministry as a priest, and would be petitioning the Holy See for a dispensation from the rights and obligations of the clerical state ("laicization"). Citing the COVID-19 pandemic as a catalyst, Horan said that "subtle changes and growth" and a "wrestling with" where his passions were helped determine his decision. In a August 2026 article, Horan stated that he had married a fellow Catholic theologian and professor; she had previously been a "close friend and colleague".
