= Jacobus Naveros =

Jacob Naveros (fl. ca. 1533) was an early sixteenth-century Spanish logician. He is now known for his concern about the attribution of the logical works of Duns Scotus. Naveros found inconsistencies between the logical works and Scotus' commentary on the Sentences that caused him to doubt whether he had written any of these works.

Naveros was born at the end of the 15th century, at Castronuño. He wrote a number of works in Latin.
