= Haecceitism =

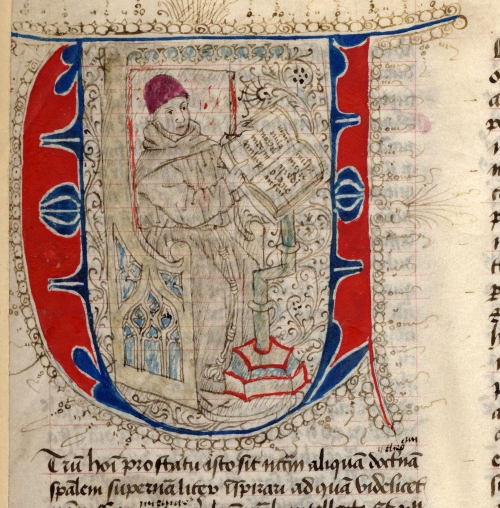
The Quaestiones of John Duns Scotus (manuscript of the sec. XIV-XV): decorated initial.

Haecceitism is a philosophical concept that stems from the field of metaphysics, particularly dealing with the nature of individuality and identity. The term "haecceity" itself comes from the Latin word "haecceitas," which means "thisness." This concept was originally developed in the medieval scholastic tradition and is often associated with the philosopher John Duns Scotus.

In essence, haecceitism focuses on the idea that each individual entity has a unique, unrepeatable quality that makes it different from every other entity. This quality is not dependent on an entity's properties or relations to other things; it's something intrinsic to the entity itself, which is "a set of principles which are essential to it and distinguish it from everything else." James Ladyman characterizes haecceitism as "the claim that worlds can differ solo numero, that worlds can differ de re whilst not differing de dicto, sometimes said, that worlds can differ solely by the permutation of individuals."

For example, consider two completely identical twins. Even if they share all the same properties (like appearance, genetic makeup, etc.), haecceitism holds that there is still something fundamentally different about each twin that makes them distinct individuals. This difference is their "haecceity."

Haecceitism challenges the idea that an individual can be fully described or defined by its properties or relations. Instead, it suggests that there is an irreducible aspect to each individual that makes them uniquely themselves. This concept has implications for discussions about identity over time, the nature of individual objects, and the idea of identity of indiscernibles in philosophy.

In more modern contexts, haecceitism is sometimes discussed in relation to issues of the nature of transworld identity in metaphysics. It raises questions about how we recognize and understand the individuality of objects, and about what it is that makes something the particular thing it is.

== An analysis based on possible worlds ==
Haecceitism is usually reformulated as a modal thesis. However, there is a debate between philosophers who hold different view about possibilities and possible world, some frameworks distinguish possible worlds from the maximal possibilities they represent, conversely, other approaches merge this separation by equating maximal possibilities directly with possible worlds. Possibility Haecceitism, a weaker formulation, proposes that there are distinct maximal possibilities, which are differentiated solely by the non-qualitative possibilities they encompass. This viewpoint suggests that even when all qualitative aspects are identical, maximal possibilities can still be distinct based on their non-qualitative elements. It implies that maximal possibilities include qualitative possibilities and non-qualitative possibilities. The anti-haecceitism to the thesis of possibility haecceitism is to deny that there is a haecceitistic possibility. Taking a further step, World Haecceitism posits that haecceities are qualities that distinguish between different possible worlds. It maintains that two possible worlds could be qualitatively identical (having all the same qualitative properties and relations) but still be different worlds because they contain different individuals. In this view, haecceities are seen as world-indexed properties that provide the identity of individuals across possible worlds. The anti-haecceitism position here is that "necessarily, the world could not be non-qualitatively different without being qualitatively different."
