= Francisco Macedo, Piauí =

Coordinates: 7°19′51″S 40°47′16″W

Francisco Macêdo
- Municipality
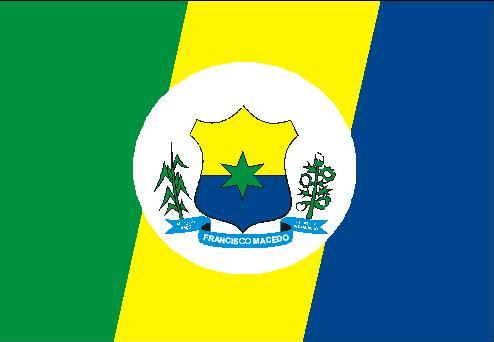
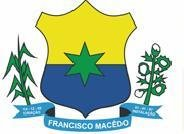
- Flag Coat of arms

- Country: Brazil
- Region: Nordeste
- State: Piauí
- Mesoregion: Sudeste Piauiense

Population (2020)
  - Total: 3,200
- Time zone: UTC−3 (BRT)

Francisco Macêdo is a municipality in the state of Piauí in the Northeast region of Brazil.

== See also ==
- List of municipalities in Piauí
