= José Arlegui =

Spanish theologian (c.1686–1750)

José Arlegui (c. 1686-1750) was a Spanish Franciscan theologian of the 18th century, from Biscay, who wrote on theological subjects, some of them related to the ethnology of Mexico.

== Life ==
He was first attached to the Franciscan province of Cantabria, then transferred to Zacatecas in Mexico.

== Works ==
His most important work was the Cronica de Zacatecas, which was published in 1737. He gives an account of the missions in his province, including many reports on the native Americans of Zacatecas. This is a major primary source for them, who are otherwise hardly touched by contemporary published documents, and of the first attempts to convert them to Christianity. The work is divided into five parts, discussing:

1. the origins of the Spanish settlement in Zacatecas
2. the founding of the monasteries
3. the local Native Americans
4. the friars who had been killed by natives
5. other famous friars

Ernest J. Burrus describes the chronicle as "very uneven", providing important sources on topics close to Arlegui's own time, but "inaccurate and untrustworthy" on earlier history. Robert Ricard criticizes Arlegui's chronology as inaccurate and contradictory, while praising him for distinguishing himself among contemporary chroniclers by attempting to include it at all.

== Attribution ==
- The entry cites:
  - Cronica de la Provincia de Zacatecas, 1737. Very rare. *Beristain de Souza, Biblioteca Hispano-Americana setentrional (Mexico, 1816), I;
  - Casual mention also in the Documentos para la Historia de Mexico, first and second series.
