= Viatora Coccaleo =

Viatora Coccaleo (so called from his birthplace, Coccaglio in Lombardy, date of birth unknown; d. 1793) was an Italian Capuchin theologian.

== Works ==
For a time, he was lector in theology. Among his works are:

- "Tentamina theologico-scholastica" (Bergamo, 1768–74);
- "Tentaminum theologicorum in moralibus Synopsis" (Venice, 1791);
- "Instituta moralia" (Milan, 1760).

His defence of papal supremacy, "Italus ad Justinum Febronium" (Lucca, 1768; Trent, 1774), is one of the principal apologies against Febronius. Besides writing several works against Jansenism, he took part in the discussion concerning the devotion to the Sacred Heart and the sanctification of Holy Days, made famous by the Synod of Pistoia (1786), and published:

- "Riflessioni sopra l'origine e il fine della divozione del S. Cuore di Gesù" (Naples, 1780);
- "Riposta sul dubbio, se la sola Messa basti a santificare le feste" (Bologna, 1781);
- Studies on the text and meaning of the poem of Prosper of Aquitaine, "Contra Ingratos" (2 vols., Brescia, 1756 and 1763)
- A work on the philosophic spirit of Prosper's epigrams (Brescia, 1760).
