= Pio Fabio Paolini =

Italian painter

Pio Fabio Paolini or Pio Paolini (1620 in Udine – 1692) was an Italian painter of the Baroque period.

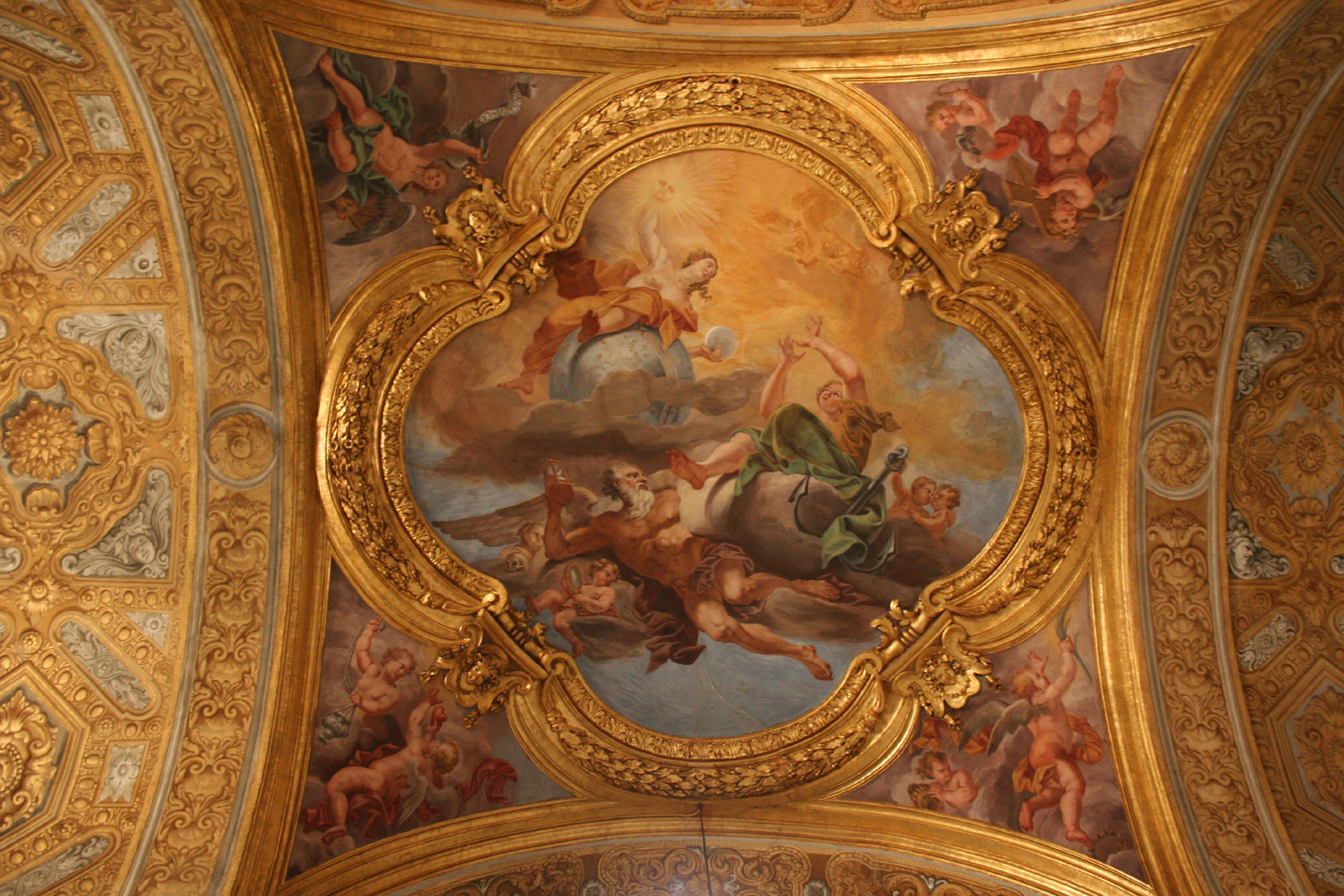
Hope and Truth, fresco ceiling San Carlo al Corso, Rome.

== Biography ==
He migrated from Udine to Rome to become a pupil of Giovanni Lanfranco. In Rome, his masterwork was a ceiling fresco of Hope and Truth (1677-1679) for the church of San Carlo al Corso. He was inducted into Academy of San Luca in 1678. After briefly returning to Udine, he relocated to Sicily, where he initially worked in Catania, then in Messina, where he ultimately was buried. Many of his works in Sicily have been damaged by the earthquakes.
