= Moyenneville =

Moyenneville is the name of three communes in France:

- Moyenneville, Oise
- Moyenneville, Pas-de-Calais
- Moyenneville, Somme
