= Richard of Middleton =

Norman Franciscan, theologian, and philosopher

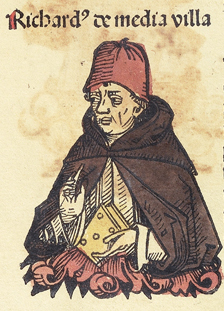
A generic portrait of Richardus de media villa in a woodcut from the Nuremberg Chronicle

Richard of Middleton (Medieval Latin: Richardus de Mediavilla; c. 1249 – c. 1308) was a member of the Franciscan Order, a theologian, and scholastic philosopher.

== Life ==
Richard's origins are unclear: he was either Norman French (from Menneville or Moyenneville) or English (from Middleton or Middletown). As a Bachelor of the Sentences of Peter Lombard at the University of Paris in 1283, he played a part in the Franciscan commission examining Peter Olivi. He was regent master of the Franciscan studium in Paris from 1284 to 1287, and, on 20 September 1295 in Metz, he was elected Franciscan minister provincial of France. He was also subsequently tutor to Louis of Toulouse, son of Charles II of Anjou. He died sometime between 1300 and 1308.

== Theology and philosophy ==
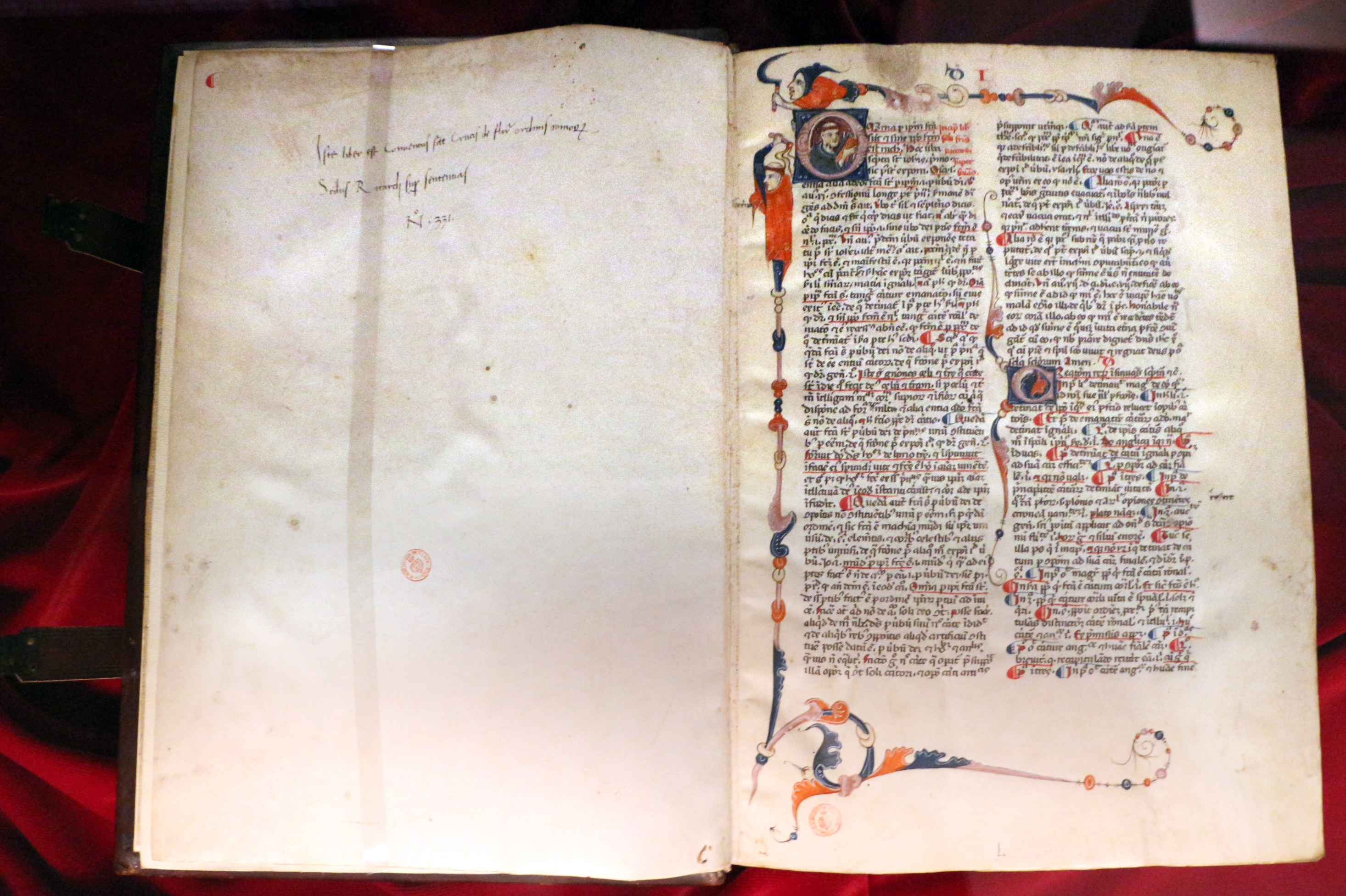
Commentarium..., c. 1250-1275, Biblioteca Medicea Laurenziana, Florence

His extant theological output is mainly contained in his two commentaries on the Sentences of Peter Lombard, which he edited between 1285 and 1295, three sets of quodlibetal disputations and some 45 disputed questions. His work is heavily influenced by his predecessors at Paris, including Bonaventure, Henry of Ghent and Thomas Aquinas. Although his philosophy owes much to the Franciscan school of thought, with regard to the plurality of forms in a single substance, for example, he also affirmed universal hylomorphism, thus following Aquinas. In this regard, he did not shy away from synthesizing Aristotelian thought into his own philosophical reasoning, in spite of the hostility surrounding the Averroist doctrines that were condemned at the University of Paris in 1270 and 1277. Along with other masters of theology, his quodlibetal disputations had resonance beyond the immediate milieu of the University. For example, in 1285, he was one of the masters who debated whether annuities were licit or illicit as a form of contract.

== Works ==
- Richard of Middleton, Quodlibeta doctoris eximii Ricardi de Mediavilla ordinis minorum (Brescia, 1591; repr. Frankfurt am Main, 1963).
- Richard of Middleton, Super Quatuor Libros Sententiarum, 4 vols. (Brescia, 1591, repr. Frankfurt am Main, 1963).

== Sources ==
- F. Maurice Powicke and E. B. Fryde. Handbook of British Chronology 2nd. ed. London: Royal Historical Society 1961.
- Étienne Gilson, History of Christian Philosophy in the Middle Ages, New York: Random House, 1955, p. 347.
- Édouard-Henri Wéber, RICHARD DE MEDIAVILLA ou DE MIDDLETON (1249 env.-entre 1300 et 1308), Encyclopædia Universalis [en ligne] - http://www.universalis.fr/encyclopedie/richard-de-mediavilla-de-middleton/
- E. Amann, 'Richard de Mediavilla', Dictionnaire de Théologie Catholique, xiii.2 (1937), pp. 2669–75.
- Richard Cross, 'Richard of Middleton', A Companion to Philosophy in the Middle Ages, Edited by: JORGE J. E. GRACIA and TIMOTHY B. NOONE (2005).
- Richard Cross, 'Richard of Middleton', Encyclopedia of Medieval Philosophy (2011), pp 1132–1134
- Ian P. Wei, 'The masters of theology at the University of Paris in the late thirteenth and early fourteenth centuries: an authority beyond the schools', Bulletin of the John Rylands University Library of Manchester 75, (1993) p. 37 - 63.
- Ian P. Wei, Intellectual Culture in Medieval Paris. Theologians and the University, c. 1100-1330, (Cambridge University Press, 2012), p. 332. ISBN 9781107460362
