= William of Melitona =

Catholic theologian

William of Melitona, Meliton or Middleton (died 1257) was a Catholic theologian. By 1248, he was a master in theology, teaching at the University of Cambridge and as the Franciscan chair of theology at the University of Paris.
