= José de Carabantes =

Spanish theologian

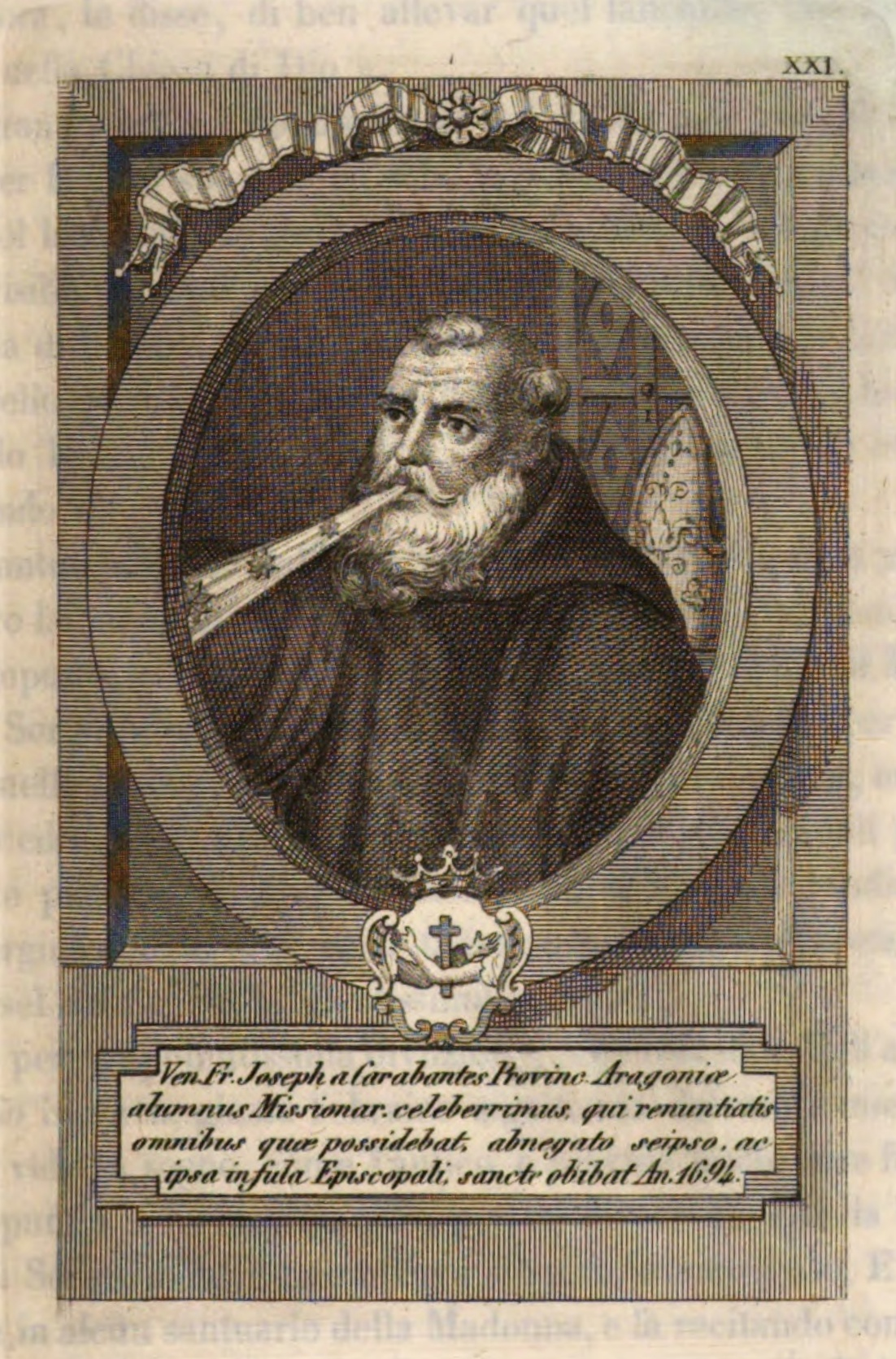
José carabantes

José de Carabantes (Carabantes) (1628 in Aragon – 1694) was a Spanish Capuchin theologian. He worked for the evangelization of the Native Americans in Spanish America.

== Works ==
De Carabantes wrote a work entitled Ars addicendi atque docendi idiomata, and likewise a Lexicon, seu vocabularium verborum, adverbiorum, etc., for the use of missionaries (Madrid, 1678).

== Beatification process ==
Theologians approved Carabantes's spiritual writings on 27 July 1904, and his cause was formally opened on 24 August 1910, granting him the title of a Servant of God. He was later declared venerable.
