= Péronne, Saône-et-Loire =

Péronne
- Commune
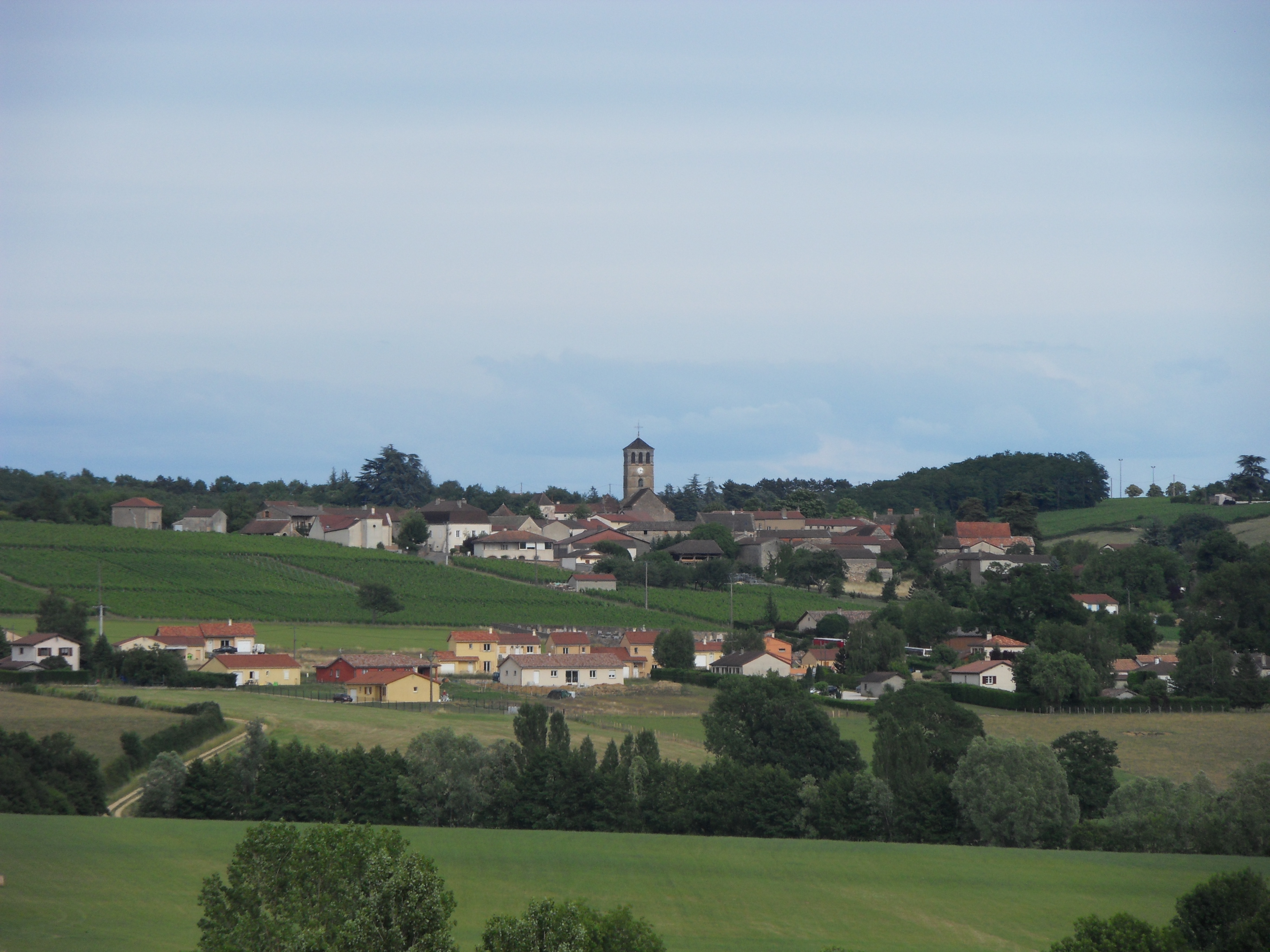
- A general view of Péronne
- Location of Péronne
- Location within France Location within Bourgogne-Franche-Comté
- Coordinates: 46°26′16″N 4°48′33″E
- Country: France
- Region: Bourgogne-Franche-Comté
- Department: Saône-et-Loire
- Arrondissement: Mâcon
- Canton: Hurigny
- Intercommunality: Mâconnais Beaujolais Agglomération

Government
  - Mayor (2020–2026): Jean-Pierre Pacaud
- Area^{1}: 10.56 km^{2} (4.08 sq mi)
- Elevation: 275 m (902 ft)
- Highest elevation: 441 m (1,447 ft)
- Lowest elevation: 222 m (728 ft)
- Population (2023): 668
  - Density: 63.3/km^{2} (164/sq mi)
- Time zone: UTC+01:00 (CET)
  - Summer (DST): UTC+02:00 (CEST)
- INSEE/Postal code: 71345 /71260
- ^{1} French Land Register data, which excludes lakes, ponds, glaciers > 1 km^{2} (0.386 sq mi or 247 acres) and river estuaries.

Péronne (French pronunciation: [peʁɔn]) is a commune in the Saône-et-Loire department in the region of Bourgogne-Franche-Comté in eastern France.

== See also ==
- Communes of the Saône-et-Loire department
