= Menneville =

Menneville is the name of two communes in France:

- Menneville, Aisne
- Menneville, Pas-de-Calais
