= Francisco Macedo (theologian) =

Portuguese Franciscan theologian (1596–1681)

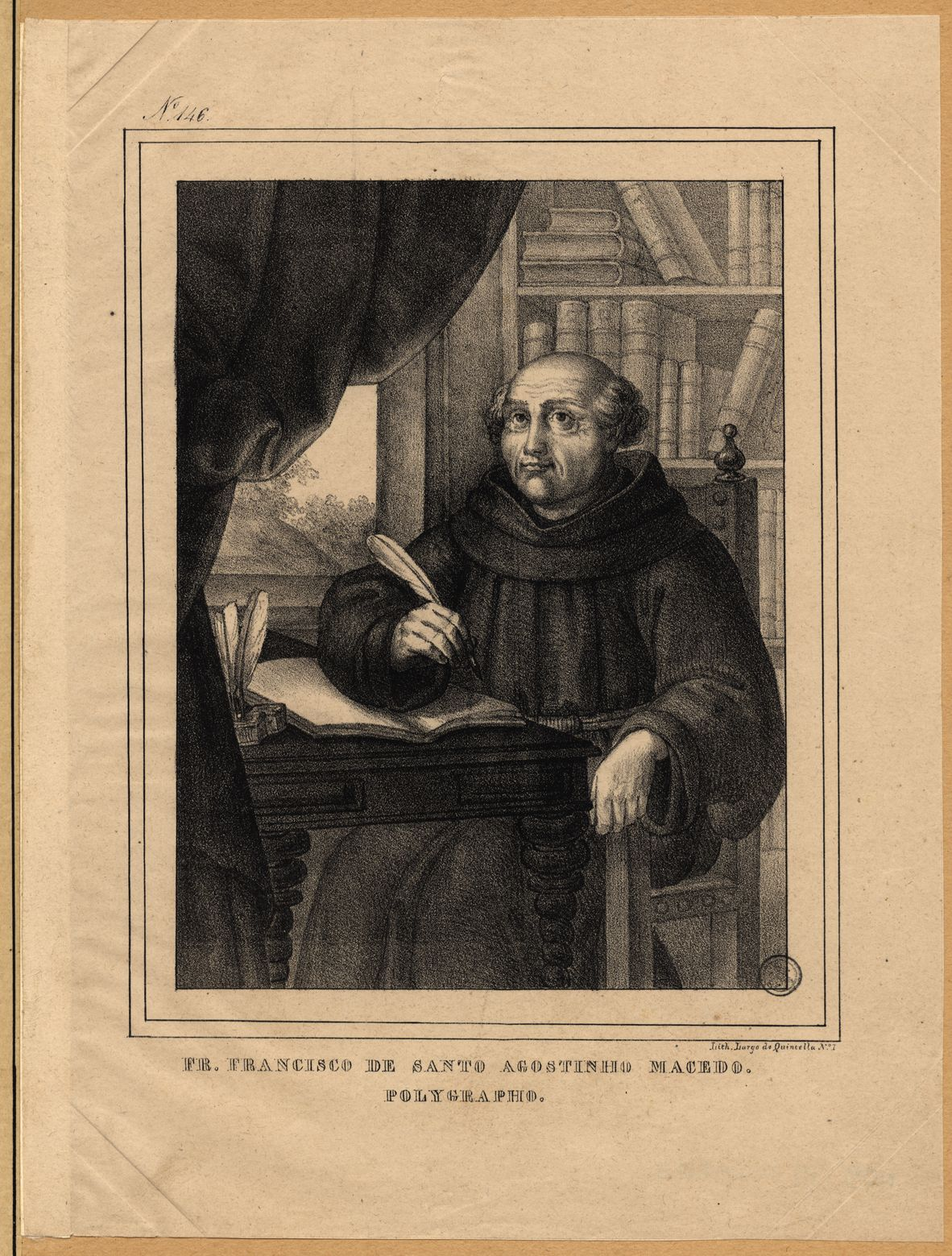
1837 engraving of Macedo

Francisco Macedo (born at Coimbra, Portugal, 1596; died Padua, 1 May 1681), known as S. Augustino, was a Portuguese Franciscan theologian.

== Life ==
He entered the Jesuit Order in 1610, which however he left in 1638 in order to join the Discalced Augustinians. These also he left in 1648, for the Franciscans. In Portugal he sided with the House of Braganza.

Summoned to Rome by Pope Alexander VII, he taught theology at the College of the Propaganda, and afterwards church history at the Sapienza, and as consultor to the Inquisition. At Venice in 1667, during the week beginning 26 September, he held a public disputation, against all comers, on nearly every branch of human knowledge, especially the Bible, theology, patrology, history, law, literature, and poetry. He named this disputation, in his quaint and extravagant style, "Leonis Marci rugitus litterarii" (the literary roaring of the Lion of St. Mark); this obtained for him the freedom of the city of Venice and the professorship of moral philosophy at the University of Padua.

== Works ==
Rather restless, but a man of enormous erudition, he wrote a number of books, of which over 100 appeared in print, and about thirty are still unprinted. They included:

- "Collationes doctrinae S. Thomae et Scoti (Padua, 1671, 1673, 1680), 3 vols. in folio;
- "Scholae theologicae positivae ad... confutationem haereticorum" (Rome, 1696) copied in part in Roccaberti, "Bibliotheca Maxima Pontifica", XII (Rome, 1696) 221–48;
- "De clavibus Petri" (Rome, 1660) partially reprinted in Roccaberti, XII, 113–37;

Controversiae selectae contra haereticos" (Rome, 1663)

- "Assertor romanus adversus calumnias heterodoxorum Anglorum praesertim et Scotorum in academiis Oxoniensi, Cantabrigiensi et Aberdoniensi" (Rome, 1667);
- "Tessera romana auctoritatis pontificiae adversus buccinam Thomae Angli" (London, 1654), also in Roccaberti, XII, 164–220.

He also took an active part in the Jansenist controversy, being at first inclined to Jansenism; but afterwards he defended the Tridentine interpretation of Augustine of Hippo's teaching with regard to grace.

- "Scrutinium divi Augustini" (London, 1644; Paris, 1648; Munster, 1649);
- "Cortina divi Augustini" (Paris, 1648 etc.);
- "Mens divinitus inspirata SS. papae Innocentii X". (Louvain, 1655);
- "Commentationes duae ecclesiastico-polemicae" (Verona, 1674), concerning Vincent of Lérins and Hilarius of Arles, against whom H. Norisius wrote his "Adventoria" in Patrologia Latina. XLVII, 538 sq. "Medulla historiae ecclesisticae" (Padua, 1671);
- "Azymus Eucharisticus", Ingolstadt ( Venice, --), 1673, against Cardinal Giovanni Bona, and at once placed on the Index (21 June 1673), "until it is corrected", which was done in the new edition (Verona, 1673); Mabillon also wrote against this.
- "Schema S. congregationis s. officii" (Padua, 1676).
