= Mathias Hauzeur =

Belgian Franciscan theologian

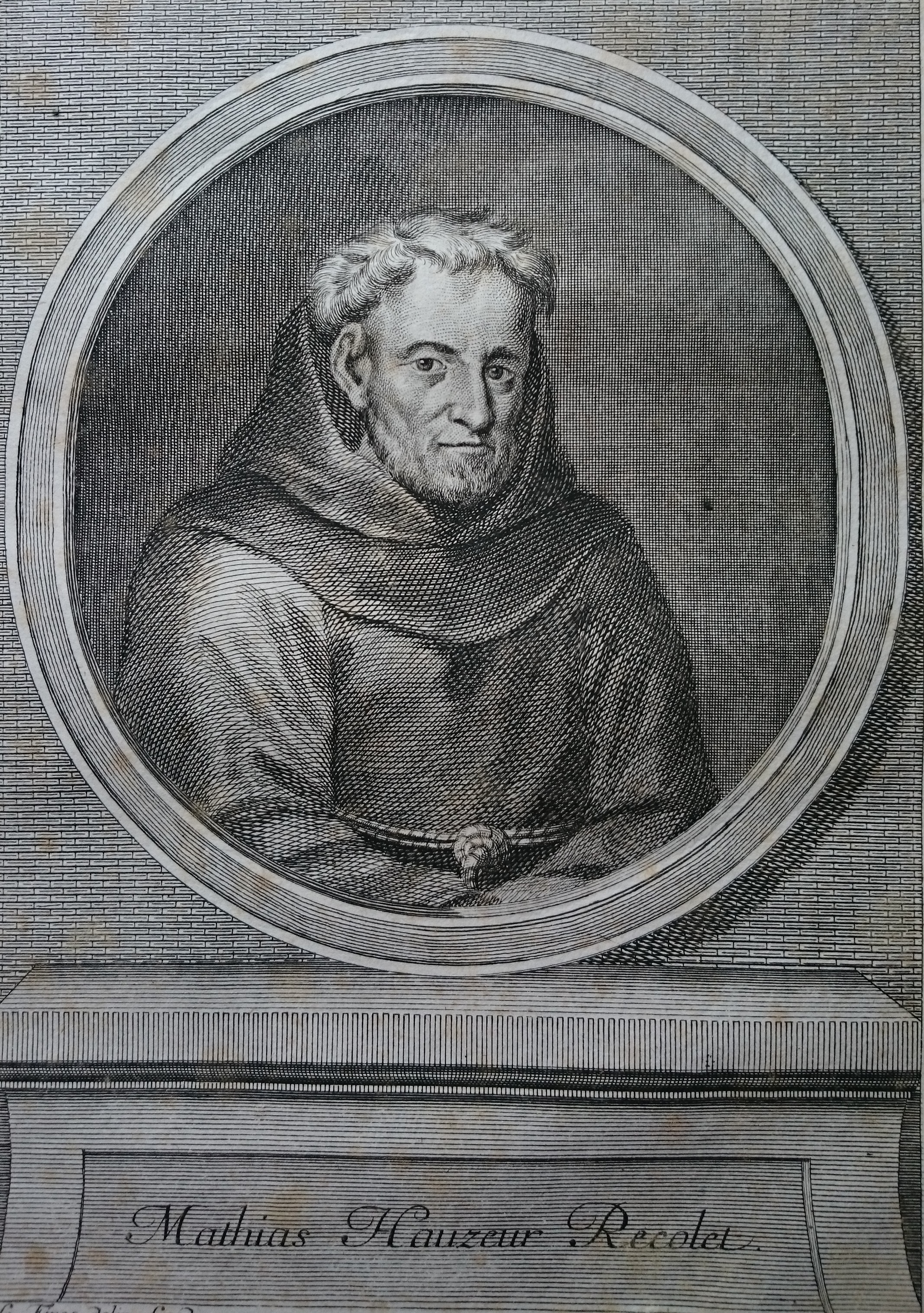
Mathias Hauzeur Recolet (engraving of an ancient portrait).

Mathias Hauzeur (1589 at Verviers – 12 November 1676 at Liège) was a Belgian Franciscan theologian.

== Life ==
He was for many years professor of theology. He was a prolific writer and left behind twenty works, while, as a keen controversialist, he attained great celebrity in consequence of his disputation with the Calvinist preacher Gabriel Hotton, which continued from 19 to 22 April 1633, and, was brought by Hauzeur to such a conclusion that the Catholics throughout the vicinity lit bonfires to celebrate his triumph.

== Works ==
He describes this controversy in his Accusation et conviction du Sieur Hotton (Liège, 1633), issued also in Latin under the title Conferentia publica inter M. Hauzeur et G. Hotton (Liège, 1633).

Other important works of Hauzeur are:

- Anatomia totius Augustissimae Doctrinae S. Augustini, secundum litteram ... et spiritum (2 vols., Augustae Eburonum 1643-45)
- Collatio Totius Theologiae inter Maiores nostros Alexandrum Halensem, S. Bonaventuram, Fr. Joannem Druns Scotum, ad mentem S. Augustini (2 vols., Liège and Namur, 1652)
- Livre de ce grand Docteur S. Augustine du soing qu'il faut porter pour les morts (Liège, 1636), combining:
  - Exorcismes catholiques du maling esprit hérétique etc. (Liège, 1634), directed against Hotton
  - Equulcus ecclesiasticus, aculeatus exorcismis XXIII etc. (Liège, 1635), against the Calvinist Samuel des Maretz
  - Praejudicia augustissima D. Augustini pro verâ Christi Ecclesiâ (Liège, 1634) of which he published a Synopsis in French
- Apologia Analogica pro vero ordine et successore S. Francisci (Aug. Eburorum, 1650, and 1653), in reply to Boverius's Annales Ord. Min. Capucc

He also issued a Flemish translation of Augustin's De utilitate credendi (Liège, 1636), but his writings against Jansenism remained unpublished.
