= Duns Scotus =

Scottish Franciscan friar and philosopher (c. 1265/66–1308)

Blessed Duns Scotus OFM
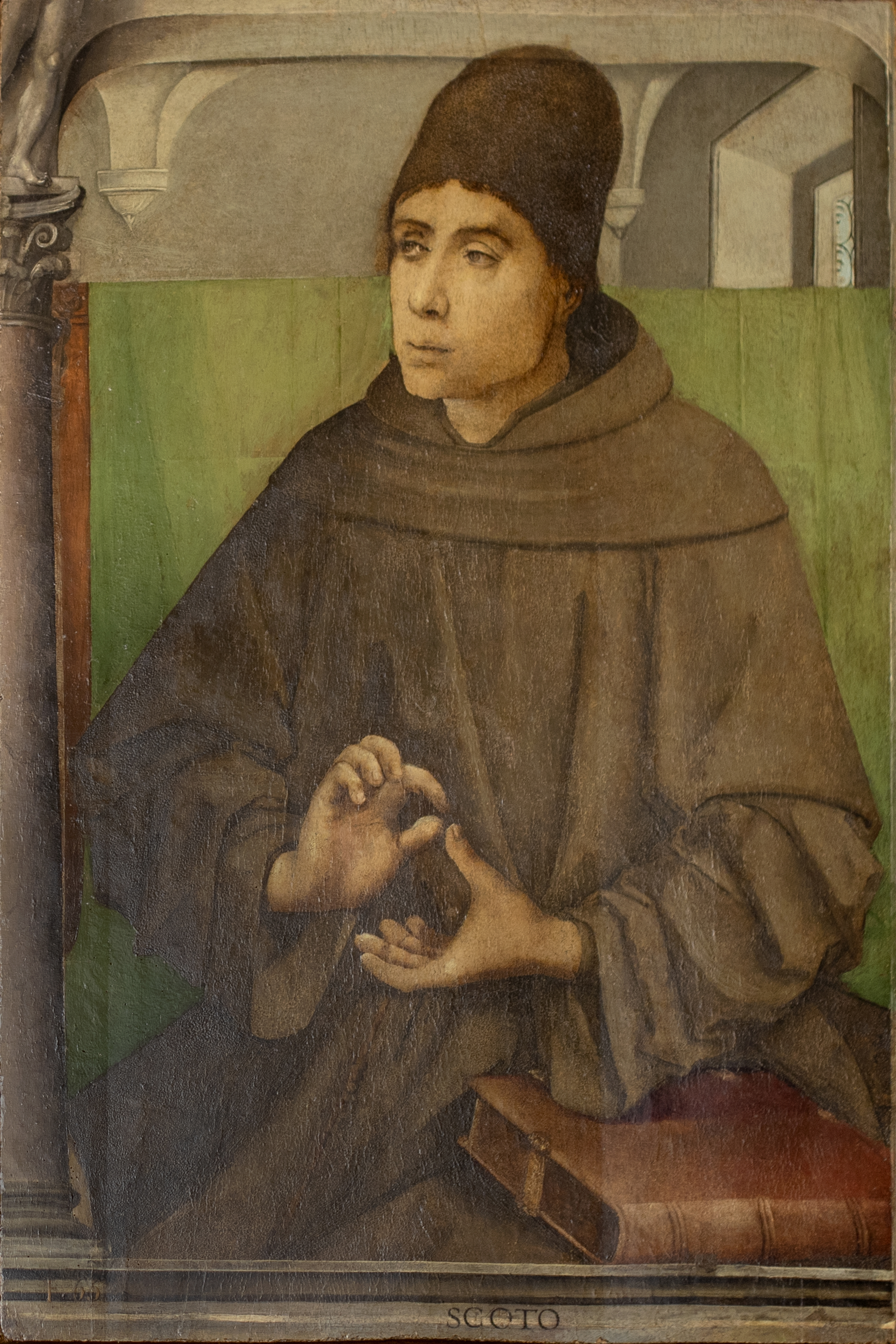
- Portrait by Justus van Gent, c. 1476–78
- Born: John Duns c. 1265/66; Duns, Berwickshire, Kingdom of Scotland
- Died: 8 November 1308 (aged 41–42); Cologne, Holy Roman Empire
- Venerated in: Catholic Church
- Beatified: 20 March 1993, Vatican City by Pope John Paul II
- Major shrine: Franciscan Church, Cologne, Germany
- Feast: 8 November
- Attributes: Books, a vision of the Blessed Virgin Mary, the moon on the chest of a Franciscan friar
- Patronage: Academics, Cologne, Germany, apologies, scholars, student, theologians and philosophers

Education
- Education: University of Oxford; University of Paris
- Academic advisor: William of Ware

Philosophical work
- Era: Medieval philosophy
- Region: Western philosophy
- School: Scholasticism; Scotism; Aristotelianism; Theological voluntarism; Philosophical realism; Medieval realism (Scotistic realism)
- Institutions: University of Oxford
- Notable students: Antonius Andreas (traditionally attributed)
- Main interests: Metaphysics, theology, logic, epistemology, ethics
- Notable ideas: Univocity of being; Formal distinction; Theological voluntarism; Haecceity as a principle of individuation; Scotistic realism; Immaculate Conception of the Virgin Mary

John Duns Scotus (/ˈdʌnz ˈskoʊtəs/ dunz SKOH-təs; Ecclesiastical Latin: [duns ˈskɔtus], 'Duns the Scot'; c. 1265/66 – 8 November 1308) was a Scottish Catholic priest and Franciscan friar, university professor, philosopher and theologian. He is considered among the most important philosopher-theologians in Western Christendom during the last part of the medieval period, together with Thomas Aquinas, Bonaventure and William of Ockham. The intellectual tradition derived from Scotus's work is called Scotism.

Duns Scotus has had considerable influence on both Catholic and secular thought. The doctrines for which he is best known are the "univocity of being", that existence is the most abstract concept we have, applicable to everything that exists; the formal distinction, a way of distinguishing between different formalities of the same thing; and the idea of haecceity, the property supposed to be in each individual thing that makes it an individual (i.e., a certain "thisness"). Duns Scotus also developed a complex argument for the existence of God, and argued for the Immaculate Conception of Mary.

Duns Scotus was given the scholastic accolade Doctor Subtilis ('the subtle Doctor') for his penetrating and subtle manner of thought. He was beatified by Pope John Paul II in 1993.

== Life ==
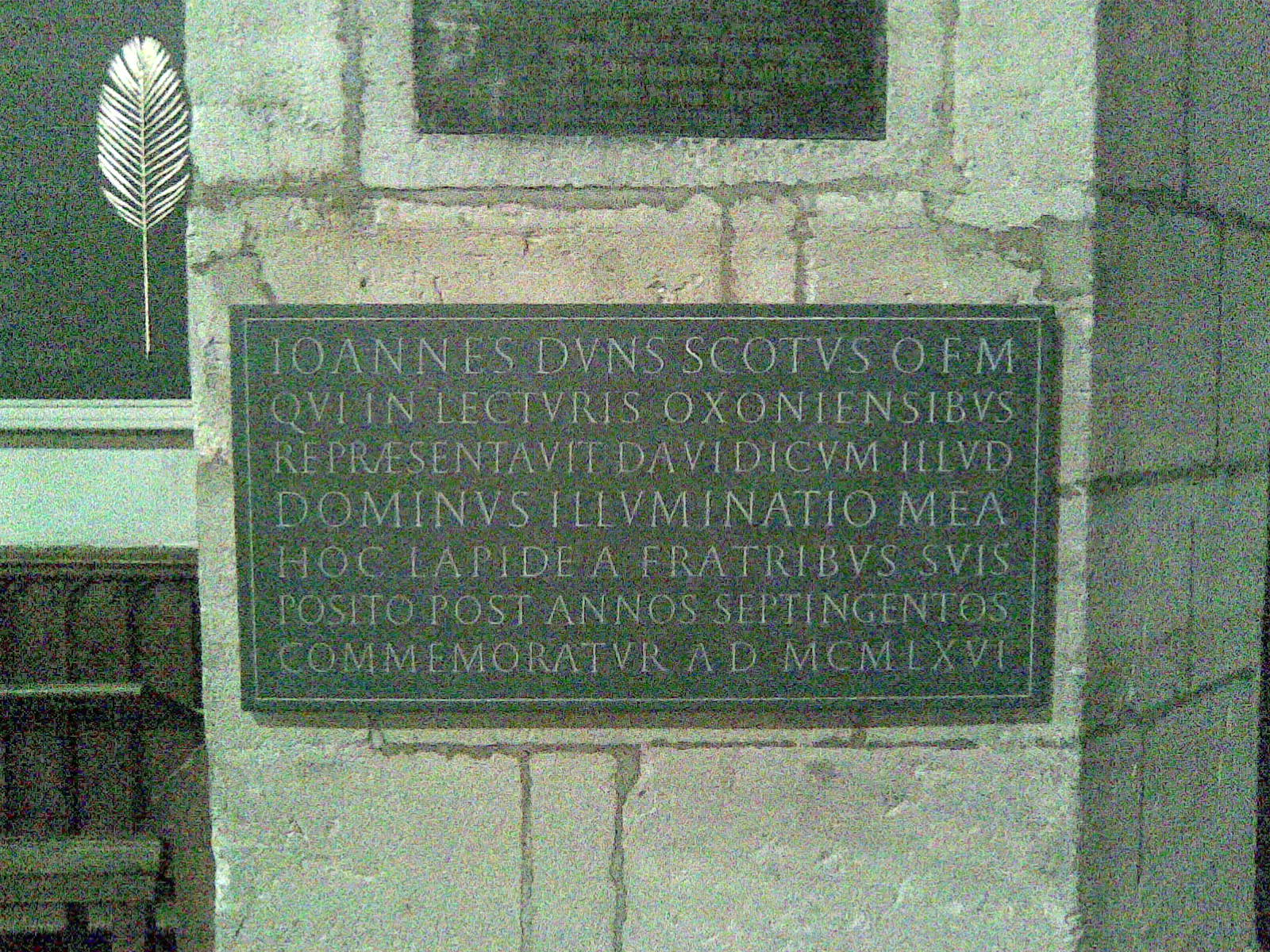
Plaque commemorating Duns Scotus in the University Church, Oxford

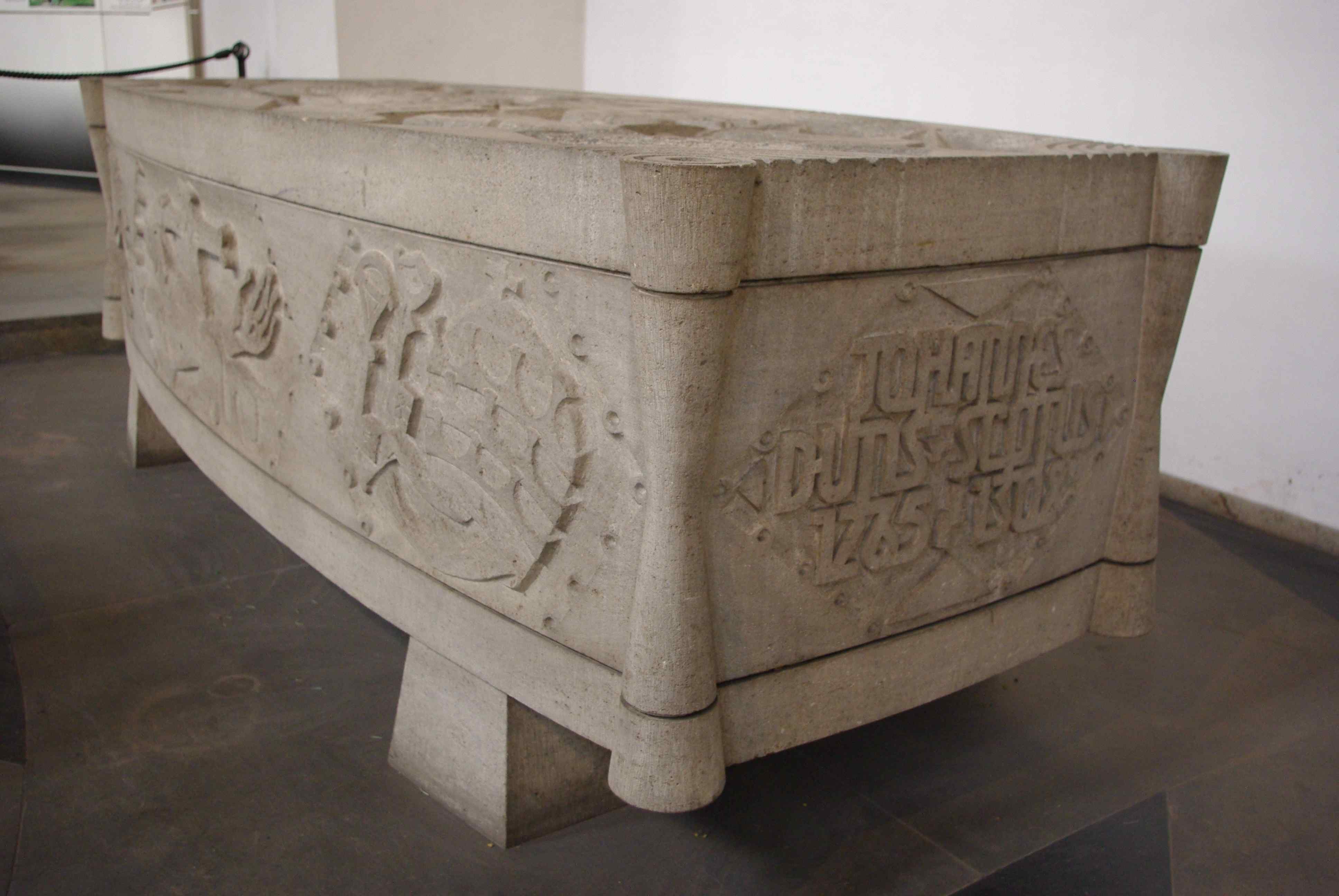
Tomb of Duns Scotus

Little is known of Duns Scotus apart from his work. His date of birth is believed to have been sometime between 23 December 1265 and 17 March 1266. He was born into a leading family of the region. The reputed site of his birth, in front of the Pavilion Lodge, near the North Lodge of Duns Castle in Scotland, is now marked by a cairn which was erected in 1966 by the Franciscan friars of the United Kingdom to mark the 700th anniversary of his birth. Duns Scotus received the religious habit of the Order of Friars Minor at Dumfries, where his uncle, Elias Duns, was guardian.

Duns Scotus's age is based on the first certain date for his life, that of his ordination to the priesthood at St Andrew's, Northampton, England, on 17 March 1291. The minimum canonical age for receiving holy orders is 25 and it is generally assumed that he would have been ordained as soon as it was permitted. That his contemporaries called him Johannes Duns, after the medieval practice of calling people by their Christian name followed by their place of origin, suggests that he came from Duns, in Berwickshire, Scotland.

According to tradition, Duns Scotus was educated at a Franciscan studium generale (a medieval university), a house behind St Ebbe's Church, Oxford, in a triangular area enclosed by Pennyfarthing Street and running from St Aldate's to the castle, the bailey and the old wall, where the Friars Minor had moved when the University of Paris was dispersed in 1229–30. At that time there would have been about 270 people living there, of whom about 80 would have been friars.

Duns Scotus appears to have been in Oxford by 1300, as he is listed among a group of friars for whom the provincial superior of the English ecclesiastical province (which included Scotland) requested faculties from the Bishop of Lincoln for the hearing of confessions. He took part in a disputation under the regent master, Philip of Bridlington in 1300–01. He began lecturing on Peter Lombard's Sentences at the prestigious University of Paris towards the end of 1302. Later in that academic year, however, he was expelled from the University of Paris for siding with Pope Boniface VIII in his feud with King Philip IV of France over the taxation of church property.

Duns Scotus was back in Paris before the end of 1304, probably returning in May. He continued lecturing there until, for reasons that are still mysterious, he was dispatched to the Franciscan studium at Cologne, probably in October 1307. According to the 15th-century writer William Vorilong, his departure was sudden and unexpected. He was relaxing or talking with students in the Prato clericorum or Pré-aux-Clercs—an open area of the Rive Gauche used by scholars for recreation—when orders arrived from the Franciscan Minister General; Scotus left immediately, taking few or no personal belongings.

Duns Scotus died unexpectedly in Cologne in November 1308; the date of his death is traditionally given as 8 November. He is buried in the Church of the Friars Minor there. His sarcophagus bears the Latin poem:

Scotia me genuit.
Anglia me suscepit.
Gallia me docuit.
Colonia me tenet.

'Scotland brought me forth.
England sustained me.
France taught me.
Cologne holds me.'

A story about Duns Scotus being buried alive, in the absence of his servant who alone knew of his susceptibility to coma, is probably a myth. The first known attestation of this theme dates from around 1400. Among many authors, Francis Bacon reported it in his Historia vitae et mortis.

The colophon of Codex 66 of Merton College, Oxford, says that Scotus was also at Cambridge.

== Work ==
Scotus's great work is his commentary on the Sentences of Peter Lombard, which contains nearly all the philosophical views and arguments for which he is well known, including the univocity of being, the formal distinction, less than numerical unity, individual nature or "thisness" (haecceity), his critique of illuminationism and his renowned argument for the existence of God. His commentary exists in several versions. The standard version is the Ordinatio (also known as the Opus oxoniense), a revised version of lectures he gave as a bachelor at Oxford. The initial revision was probably begun in the summer of 1300 – see the remarks in the Prologue, question 2, alluding to the Battle of Wadi al-Khazandar in 1299, news of which probably reached Oxford in the summer of 1300. It was still incomplete when Scotus left for Paris in 1302.

The two other versions of the work are Scotus's notes for the Oxford lectures, recently transcribed and published as the Lectura, the first book of which was probably written in Oxford in the late 1290s, and the Reportatio parisiensis (or Opus parisiense), consisting of transcriptions of the lectures on the Sentences given by Scotus when he was in Paris. A reportatio is a student report or transcription of the original lecture of a master. A version that has been checked by the master himself is known as a reportatio examinata.

By the time of Scotus, these "commentaries" on the Sentences were no longer literal commentaries. Instead, Peter Lombard's original text was used as a starting point for highly original discussions on topics of theological or philosophical interest. For example, Book II Distinction 2, about the location of angels, is a starting point for a complex discussion about continuous motion, and whether the same thing can be in two different places at the same time (bilocation). In the same book, Distinction 3, he uses the question of how angels can be different from one another, given that they have no material bodies, to investigate the difficult question of individuation in general.

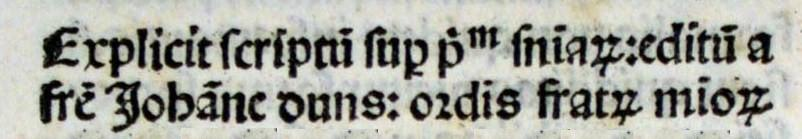
Colophon from the edition of Scotus's Sentences commentary edited by Thomas Penketh (died 1487) and Bartolomeo Bellati (died 1479), printed by Johannes de Colonia and Johannes Manthen, Venice in 1477. It reads Explicit Scriptum super Primum Sententiarum: editum a fratre Johanne Duns: ordinis fratrum minorum. Printed versions of scholastic manuscripts became popular in the late fifteenth century.

Scotus wrote purely philosophical and logical works at an early stage of his career, consisting of commentaries on Aristotle's Organon. These are the Questions on Porphyry's Isagoge and Aristotle's Categories, Peri hermeneias, and De sophisticis elenchis, probably dating to around 1295. His commentary on Aristotle's Metaphysics was probably written in stages, the first version having started around 1297, with significant additions and amendments possibly after the completion of the main body of the Ordinatio. His Expositio on the Metaphysics was lost for centuries but was recently rediscovered and edited by Giorgio Pini.

In addition, there are 46 short disputations called Collationes, probably dating from 1300 to 1305; a work in natural theology (De primo principio); and his Quaestiones Quodlibetales, a record of a quodlibetal disputation probably dating to Advent 1306 or Lent 1307.

A number of works once believed to have been written by Scotus are now known to have been misattributed. There were already concerns about this within two centuries of his death, when the 16th-century logician Jacobus Naveros noted inconsistencies between these texts and his commentary on the Sentences, leading him to doubt whether he had written any logical works at all. The Questions on the Prior Analytics (In Librum Priorum Analyticorum Aristotelis Quaestiones) were also discovered to be mistakenly attributed. In 1922, Grabmann showed that the logical work De modis significandi was actually by Thomas of Erfurt, a 14th-century logician of the modist school. Thus the claim that Martin Heidegger wrote his habilitation thesis on Scotus is only half true, as the second part is actually based on the work by Erfurt.

== Metaphysics ==
=== Realism ===
Scotus's view of universals is known as Scotistic realism. Scotus is generally considered to be a realist (as opposed to a nominalist) in that he treated universals as real, but he held that they exist both in particular things and as concepts in the mind (as opposed to a Platonic "third realm"). He attacks a position close to that later defended by Ockham, arguing that things have a common nature – for example the humanity common to Socrates, Plato, and Plutarch.

=== Univocity of being ===
He followed Aristotle in asserting that the subject matter of metaphysics is "being qua being" (ens inquantum ens). Being in general (ens in communi), as a univocal notion, was for him the first object of the intellect. The doctrine of the univocity of being implies the denial of any real distinction between essence and existence. Aquinas had argued that in all finite being (i.e., all except God) the essence of a thing is distinct from its existence. Scotus rejected the real distinction in favor of the formal distinction, that two separate entities, though inseparable, do not enter into the definition of the other. Scotus argued that we cannot conceive of what it is to be something, without conceiving it as existing. We should not make any distinction between whether a thing exists (si est) and what it is (quid est) for we never know whether something exists unless we have some concept of what we know to exist.

=== Individuation ===
Scotus elaborates a distinct view on hylomorphism, with three important strong theses that differentiate him. He held: 1) that there exists matter that has no form whatsoever, or prime matter, as the stuff underlying all change, against Aquinas (cf. his Quaestiones in Metaphysicam 7, q. 5; Lectura 2, d. 12, q. un.), 2) that not all created substances are composites of form and matter (cf. Lectura 2, d. 12, q. un., n. 55), that is, that purely spiritual substances do exist, and 3) that one and the same substance can have more than one substantial form – for instance, humans have at least two substantial forms, the soul and the form of the body (forma corporeitas) (cf. Ordinatio 4, d. 11, q. 3, n. 54). He argued for an original principle of individuation (cf. Ordinatio 2, d. 3, pars 1, qq. 1–6), the "haecceity" as the ultimate unity of a unique individual (haecceitas, an entity's 'thisness'), as opposed to the common nature (natura communis) feature existing in any number of individuals. For Scotus, the axiom stating that only the individual exists is a dominating principle of the understanding of reality. For the apprehension of individuals, an intuitive cognition is required, which gives us the present existence or the non-existence of an individual, as opposed to abstract cognition. Thus the human soul, in its separated state from the body, will be capable of knowing the spiritual intuitively.

=== Formal distinction ===
Like other realist philosophers of the period (such as Aquinas and Henry of Ghent) Scotus recognised the need for an intermediate distinction that was not merely conceptual but not fully real or mind-dependent either. Scotus argued for a formal distinction (distinctio formalis a parte rei), which holds between entities which are inseparable and indistinct in reality but whose definitions are not identical. For example, the personal properties of the Trinity are formally distinct from the Divine essence. Similarly, the distinction between the "thisness" or haecceity of a thing is intermediate between a real and a conceptual distinction. There is also a formal distinction between the divine attributes and the powers of the soul.

== Theology ==
=== Voluntarism ===
Scotus was an Augustinian-Franciscan theologian. He is usually associated with theological voluntarism, the tendency to emphasize God's will and human freedom in all philosophical issues. The main difference between Aquinas's rational theology and that of Scotus is that Scotus believed certain predicates may be applied univocally, with exactly the same meaning, to God and creatures, whereas Aquinas insisted that this is impossible and that only analogical predication can be employed, in which a word as applied to God has a meaning different from, although related to, the meaning of that same word as applied to creatures. Scotus demonstrated his doctrine most forcefully in his Ordinatio.

Scotus gave the lecture, Lectura I 39, during 1297–1299 to refute the view that everything is necessary and immutable. He claims that the aim of this lecture has two points (Lectura I 39, §31): first, to consider the contingency in what is (de contingentia in entibus); second, to consider how God's certain knowledge is compatible with the contingency of things. Scotus tries to defend the validity of Christian theology against the attack of ancient philosophers. The main argument is unpacked in Lectura I 39, §§49–53. Scotus argues that a necessary being (God) is able to have contingent knowledge, and that although this knowledge is contingent, it is not necessarily mutable and temporal by that very fact. In Lectura I 39 §1, Scotus asks, "whether God has determinate knowledge of things according to every aspect of their existence, as according to being in the future." He presents a counterview which claims that God cannot have determinate knowledge of the future. To support this counterview, he uses Aristotle's De Interpretatione IX. In the following arguments, Scotus does not attempt to contradict Aristotle. He does not affirm or reject the ideas of Aristotle. The only issue he argues against is the proposition that God cannot have determinate knowledge of the future. Scotus appears to try to fully demonstrate that Aristotle's text is not contradictory to the Christian doctrine of God. Scotus argues that God wills with one single volition (unica volitione) whatever he wills. God has one volition ad intra, but this one volition can be related to many opposite things ad extra. God can simultaneously will one thing at time 1 and the opposite thing at time 2. There are various possible interpretations of Aristotle's De Interpretatione IX. For example, John Buridan (ca. 1300–1362) thought the Scotistic contingency theory was an Aristotelian view. Buridan's judgment is all the more possible because of at least four reasons: (1) Aristotle's De Interpretatione IX, 19a23-25 can be interpreted like the Scotistic contingency theory; (2) Scotus himself does not refute Aristotle's De Interpretatione IX in Lectura I 39 §§49–53; (3) Scotus, rather, tries to formulate his contingency theory with the help of other works of Aristotle in Lectura I 39 §§51, 54; (4) Scotus introduces the diachronic feature of God's volition to his contingency theory as well as the synchronic feature.

=== Metaphysical argument for the existence of God ===
Duns Scotus argued that it is better to construct a metaphysical argument for the existence of God, rather than the more common physical argument from motion favoured by Aquinas, following Aristotle. Though the version in De Primo Principio is the most complete and final version, the Ordinatio proof is usually offered. However, the De Primo version gives a wider understanding of the argument as well as Scotus's metaphysical underpinnings for his argument for God's existence, but the Ordinatio version will be followed here. Briefly, Scotus begins his proof by explaining that there are two angles we must take in arguing for the existence of an actually infinite being. First from the view of the Relative Properties of God and second from the Absolute Properties of God. Relative properties are those which are predicable of God in relation to creation; absolute properties are those which belong to God whether or not He chose to create. Under the first heading of Relative Properties, Scotus argues for a triple primacy of efficiency, finality and pre-eminence. From there he shows that one primacy implies the others, and finally there can only be one nature that is the First Efficient Cause, Ultimate End, and the Most Perfect Nature. From there the Subtle Doctor discusses the Absolute Properties of God. The First Being is intellectual and volitional, and the intellect and will are identical with the essence of this supreme nature. The First Being is also infinite being. While discussing the infinity of God, Scotus resurrects Anselm's argument and responds to the criticism that Anselm makes an illicit leap from concept to reality. Finally, he gives a definite answer of "yes" to the question of whether there exists an actually infinite being. The very next question of the Ordinatio deals with the unicity of the nature thus proved to exist. However, the De Primo Principio version concludes with this argument.

The proof for the conclusion that "some efficient cause is simply first such that neither can it be an effect nor can it, by virtue of something other than itself, cause an effect" Ordinatio I.2.43 runs like this:

1. Something can be produced.
2. It is produced either by itself, nothing, or another.
3. Not by nothing, for nothing causes nothing.
4. Not by itself, for an effect never causes itself.
5. Therefore, by another; call it A.
6. If A is first, then we have reached the conclusion.
7. If A is not first, but also an effect, we return to 2). A is produced either by itself, nothing, or another.
8. From 3) and 4), we say another, B. The ascending series will either continue infinitely or we finally reach something which has nothing prior to it.
9. An infinite ascending series is impossible.
10. Therefore, etc.

Scotus acknowledges two objections and deals with them accordingly. First is that he begs the question in assuming a first in the series. Here he argues that while many admit an infinite regress in an accidentally ordered series of causes, no philosopher admits infinite regress in an essentially ordered series. Scotus explains the differences between the two and offers proofs for the conclusion that an infinity of essentially ordered causes in a series is impossible. Second, it is objected that his proof is not really a demonstration since it begins with a contingent premise. That something is produced is contingent and not necessary. Therefore, the proof proceeds from a contingent and not a necessary premise. Scotus says that while that is true, it is utterly manifest that things are produced or effected. But in order to respond, Scotus makes a modal move and reworks the argument. Now he argues from the possibility of production. "It is possible that something can be produced" is a necessary proposition. From there he is able to conclude that it is possible that the first efficient cause exists, and if it is possible that it exists, then it does exist. He asserts that the last claim will be proved later in the argument. In the Lectura proof, Scotus argues the following way:

Although beings different from God are actually contingent with respect to their factual existence, nevertheless, they are not with respect to their possible existence. Hence, those entities which are called contingent with respect to their factual existence are necessary with respect to their possible existence – for instance, although "There exists a man" is contingent, nevertheless "It is possible that he exists" is necessary, because his existence does not include any contradiction. Therefore, "Something – different from God – is possible" is necessary, because being is divided into the contingent and the necessary. Just as necessity belongs to a necessary being in virtue of its condition or its quiddity, so possibility belongs to a possible being in virtue of its quiddity. If the first argument is alternatively qualified with the notion of ontological possibility, then we have necessary propositions as follows: It is possible that there is something different from God – it is not of itself (because then it would not be the case that it were possible), nor from nothing. Therefore, it is possible that it is from something else. Either it is possible that the other agent acts by virtue of itself – and not by virtue of something else, not being from something else – or it is not possible. If so, then it is possible that there is a first agent, and if it [is] possible that it exists, then it exists, just as we have proved before. If not and if there is no infinite regress, then the argument at once comes to a standstill.

For more on this argument, see especially "Authors/Duns Scotus/Ordinatio/Ordinatio I/D2/Q2B".

=== Illuminationism ===
Scotus argued against the version of illuminationism that had been defended earlier in the century by Henry of Ghent. In his Ordinatio (I.3.1.4) he argued against the sceptical consequences that Henry claimed would follow from abandoning divine illumination. Scotus argued that if our thinking were fallible in the way Henry had believed, such illumination could not, even in principle, ensure "certain and pure knowledge".

=== Immaculate Conception ===
Perhaps the most influential point of Duns Scotus's theology was his defense of the Immaculate Conception of Mary (i.e., that Mary herself was conceived without sin). At the time, there was a great deal of argument about the subject. The general opinion was that it was appropriately deferential to the Mother of God, but it could not be seen how to resolve the problem that only with Christ's death would the stain of original sin be removed. The great philosophers and theologians of the West were divided on the subject (indeed, even Thomas Aquinas sided with those who denied the doctrine). The feast day had existed in the East (though in the East, the feast is just of the Conception of Mary) since the seventh century and had been introduced in several dioceses in the West as well, even though the philosophical basis was lacking. Citing Anselm of Canterbury's principle, "potuit, decuit, ergo fecit" (He [i.e., God] could do it, it was appropriate, therefore He did it), Duns Scotus devised the following argument: Mary was in need of redemption like all other human beings, but through the merits of Jesus' crucifixion, given in advance, she was conceived without the stain of original sin. God could have brought it about (1) that she was never in original sin, (2) she was in sin only for an instant, (3) she was in sin for a period of time, being purged at the last instant. Whichever of these options was most excellent should probably be attributed to Mary. This apparently careful statement provoked a storm of opposition at Paris, and suggested the line 'fired France for Mary without spot' in the famous poem "Duns Scotus's Oxford," by Gerard Manley Hopkins.

Scotus's argument appears in Pope Pius IX's 1854 declaration of the dogma of the Immaculate Conception, "at the first moment of Her conception, Mary was preserved free from the stain of original sin, in view of the merits of Jesus Christ." Scotus's position was hailed as "a correct expression of the faith of the Apostles."

Another of Scotus's positions also gained official approval of the Catholic Church: his doctrine on the universal primacy of Christ became the underlying rationale for the feast of Christ the King instituted in 1925.

Scotus disagreed with Augustine on forced conversion of the Jews, declaring that a small number should be left unmolested on an island to serve as the remnant.

During his pontificate, Pope John XXIII recommended the reading of Duns Scotus's theology to modern theology students.

== Veneration ==
Duns Scotus was long honored as a Blessed by the Order of Friars Minor, as well as in the Archdioceses of Edinburgh and Cologne. In the 19th century, the process was started seeking his recognition as such by the Holy See, on the basis of a cultus immemorabilis, i.e., one of ancient standing. On 27 July 1920, a committee of theologians was convened to evaluate his spiritual writings for orthodoxy. He was declared Venerable by Pope John Paul II in 1991, who officially recognized his liturgical cult, effectively beatifying him on 20 March 1993.

== Later reputation and influence ==
=== Later medieval period ===
Duns Scotus and the Immaculate Conception, attributed to Manuel Pereira de Brito, c. 1700. Church of Our Lady of the Conception, Covilhã, Portugal.

Owing to Scotus's early and unexpected death, he left behind a large body of work in an unfinished or unedited condition. His students and disciples extensively edited his papers, often confusing them with works by other writers, in many cases leading to misattribution and confused transmission. Most 13th-century Franciscans followed Bonaventura, but the influence of Scotus (as well as that of his arch-rival William of Ockham) spread in the fourteenth century. Franciscan theologians in the late Middle Ages were thus divided between so-called Scotists and Ockhamists. Fourteenth century followers included Francis of Mayrone (died 1325), Antonius Andreas (died 1320), William of Alnwick (died 1333), and John of Bassolis (died 1347), supposedly Scotus's favourite student.

=== Sixteenth to nineteenth centuries ===
His reputation suffered during the English reformation, probably due to its association with the Franciscans. In a letter to Thomas Cromwell about his visit to Oxford in 1535, Richard Layton described how he saw the court of New College full of pages from Scotus's work, "the wind blowing them into every corner." John Leland described the Oxford Greyfriar's library in 1538 (just prior to its dissolution) as an accumulation of "cobwebs, moths and bookworms."

Critics of Scotus' work described his followers as "dunces"; the "dunce cap" was later used as a form of punishment in schools and the word "dunce" has come to be used as a term to describe someone dull-witted. When in the sixteenth century the Scotists argued against Renaissance humanism, the term duns or dunce became, in the mouths of humanists and reformers, a term of abuse and a synonym for one incapable of scholarship.

Despite this, Scotism grew in Catholic Europe. Scotus's works were collected into many editions, particularly in the late fifteenth century with the advent of printing. His school was probably at the height of its popularity at the beginning of the seventeenth century; during the sixteenth and the seventeenth centuries there were special Scotist chairs, e.g. at Paris, Rome, Coimbra, Salamanca, Alcalá, Padua, and Pavia. New ideas were included pseudographically in later editions of his work, such as the principle of explosion, now attributed to Pseudo-Scotus. Scotism flourished well into the seventeenth century, and its influence can be seen in such writers as Descartes and Bramhall. Interest dwindled in the eighteenth century, and the revival of scholastic philosophy, known as neo-Scholasticism, was essentially a revival of Thomistic thinking.

In Portugal, in the Church of the Conception of Covilhã (formerly St. Francis), there is an exceptionally rare painting in which Scotus tramples a seven-headed dragon, each representing a heresy. This image served both as a warning and an invitation to denounce others. Dr. Duns Scotus, a champion of the doctrine of the Immaculate Conception, is depicted in a manner suited to the climate of intense religiosity that prevailed in Counter-Reformation Covilhã. Here, the dragon of heresy is shown spewing forth the heads of Judas, Arius, Caleb, Pelagius, John Calvin, Subeito, and Luther. In 1704, the Inquisition prosecuted nearly fifty wool manufacturers and workers in Covilhã for "Judaizing" – one of the heresies represented in the painting. It was the deadliest year within two and a half centuries of persecution directed at the wool industry. Many fled the country.

Gerard Manley Hopkins was able to reconcile his religious calling and his vocation as a poet thanks to his reading of Duns Scotus. His poem As Kingfishers Catch Fire expresses Duns Scotus's ideas on "haecceity".

=== Twentieth century ===
The twentieth century saw a resurgence of interest in Scotus, with a range of assessments of his thought.

For one thing, Scotus has received interest from secular philosophers such as Martin Heidegger, Peter King, Gyula Klima, Paul Vincent Spade, and others.

For some today, Scotus is one of the most important Franciscan theologians and the founder of Scotism, a special form of Scholasticism. He came out of the Old Franciscan School, to which Haymo of Faversham (died 1244), Alexander of Hales (died 1245), John of Rupella (died 1245), William of Melitona (died 1260), St. Bonaventure (died 1274), Cardinal Matthew of Aquasparta (died 1289), John Peckham, Archbishop of Canterbury (died 1292), Richard of Middletown (died c. 1300) and others belonged. He was known as "Doctor Subtilis" because of the subtle distinctions and nuances of his thinking.

An important question since the 1960s has revolved over whether Scotus's thought heralded a change in thinking on the nature of 'being,' a change which marked a shift from Aquinas and other previous thinkers; this question has been particularly significant in recent years because it has come to be seen as a debate over the origins of 'modernity.' This line of argument first emerged in the 1960s among popular French philosophers who, in passing, singled out Duns Scotus as the figure whose theory of univocal being changed an earlier approach which Aquinas had shared with his predecessors. Then, in 1990, the historian of philosophy Jean-Francois Courtine argued that, between the time of Aquinas in the mid-thirteenth century and Francisco Suárez at the turn of the seventeenth, a fundamentally new approach to being was developed, with Scotus taking a major part in its development. During the 1990s, various scholars extended this argument to locate Scotus as the first thinker who succumbed to what Heidegger termed 'onto-theology'.

In recent years, this criticism of Scotus has become disseminated in particular through the writings of the 'Radical Orthodox' group of theologians, drawing on John Milbank and Catherine Pickstock. The Radical Orthodox model has been questioned by Daniel Horan and Thomas Williams, both of whom claim that Scotus's doctrine of the univocity of being is a semantic, rather than an ontological theory. Both thinkers cite Ord. 1, d. 3, pars 1, q. 3, n. 163, in which Scotus claims that "This [univocally] is how all the authoritative passages one might find on this topic in the Metaphysics or Physics should be interpreted: in terms of the ontological diversity of those things to which the concept is attributed, which is compatible with there being one concept that can be abstracted from them". Such a quotation seems to refer to epistemology, with abstracted concepts, rather than with ontology, which Scotus admits can be diverse.

== In popular media ==
In 2012 Fernando Muraca directed for TVCO and the Franciscan Friars of the Immaculate the biopic Blessed Duns Scotus: Defender of the Immaculate Conception in Italian. It centers on the debate at the Paris University with glimpses of his infancy and Franciscan vocation. Adriano Braidotti played the adult Scotus and Emanuele Maria Gamboni played Scotus as a child.

== Bibliography ==
Works in rough chronological order

- Before 1295:
  - Parva logicalia
    - Quaestiones super Porphyrii Isagogem
    - Quaestiones in librum Praedicamentorum
    - Quaestiones in I et II librum Perihermeneias
    - Octo quaestiones in duos libros Perihermeneias
    - Quaestiones in libros Elenchorum
- Quaestiones super libros De anima (1295–1298?)
- Quaestiones super libros Metaphysicorum Aristotelis (1298–1300?; revised later)
- Notabilia Scoti super Metaphysicam (a set of notes concerning books II–X and XII of Aristotle's Metaphysics, discovered only in 1996)
- Lectura (Early Oxford Lectures on the four books of the Sentences of Peter Lombard)
  - Books 1 and 2 (1300–1301)
  - Book 3 (probably written in Paris, 1303–04)
  - Book 4 (not extant)
- Ordinatio or Opus Oxoniense (Oxford Lectures: a revision of the lectures given at Oxford, books 1 and 2 summer 1300–1302, books 3 and 4, 1303–1304)
- Collationes oxonienses (1303–04 or 1305–08)
- Collationes parisienses (1302–07)
- Reportatio parisiensis (Paris Lectures, 1302–07)
- Quaestiones Quodlibetales (edited by Felix Alluntis in Obras del Doctor Sutil, Juan Duns Escoto, Madrid, Biblioteca de Autores Cristianos, 1963)
- Tractatus de Primo Principio (Treatise on the First Principle) English Translation
- Theoremata (uncertain date)

Dubious works

- Theoremata

Spurious works

- De Rerum Principio (Of the Beginning of Things). An inauthentic work once attributed to Scotus.

Latin editions

- OPERA OMNIA. (Wadding Edition, so-called after its editor Luke Wadding) Lyon, 1639; reprinted Hildesheim: Georg Olms Verlagsbuchhandlung, 1968. [Despite the title, this edition does not represent all the works of Scotus. Certain works printed in it are no longer attributed to Scotus; certain works by Scotus are omitted (including his early Lectura on the Sentences of Peter Lombard); what the book presents as Book I of Scotus's late Reportatio is in fact an entirely separate work whose authenticity and authority are vigorously disputed.]
- OPERA OMNIA. (Vatican Edition = VE) Civitas Vaticana: Typis Polyglottis Vaticanis, 1950–.
  - ORDINATIO (complete critical edition)
  - I, De Ordinatione Ioannis Duns Scoti disquisitio historico critica. Prologus totius operis, 1950.
  - II, Ordinatio. Liber Primus. Distinctiones 1–2, 1950.
  - III, Ordinatio. Liber Primus. Distinctio 3, 1954.
  - IV, Ordinatio. Liber Primus. Distinctiones 4–10, 1956.
  - V, Ordinatio. Liber Primus. Distinctiones 11–25, 1959.
  - VI, Ordinatio. Liber Primus. Distinctiones 26–48, 1963.
  - VII, Ordinatio. Liber Secundus. Distinctiones 1–3, 1973.
  - VIII, Ordinatio. Liber Secundus. Distinctiones 4–44, 2001.
  - IX, Ordinatio. Liber Tertius. Distinctiones 1–17, 2006.
  - X, Ordinatio. Liber Tertius. Distinctiones 26–40, 2007.
  - XI, Ordinatio. Liber Quartus. Distinctiones 1–7, 2008.
  - XII, Ordinatio. Liber Quartus. Distinctiones 8–13, 2010.
  - XIII, Ordinatio. Liber Quartus, Distinctiones 14–42, 2011.
  - XIV, Ordinatio. Liber Quartus, Distinctiones 43–49, 2013.
  - LECTURA
  - XVI, Lectura in Librum Primum Sententiarum. Prologus et Distinctiones 1–7, 1960.
  - XVII, Lectura in Librum Primum Sententiarum. Distinctiones 8–45, 1966.
  - XVIII, Lectura in Librum Secundum Sententiarum. Distinctiones 1–6, 1982.
  - XIX, Lectura in Librum Secundum Sententiarum. Distinctiones 7–44, 1993.
  - XX, Lectura in Librum Tertium Sententiarum. Distinctiones 1–17, 2003.
  - XXI, Lectura in Librum Tertium Sententiarum. Distinctiones 18–40, 2004.
- OPERA PHILOSOPHICA (= OP). St. Bonaventure, NY: The Franciscan Institute:, 1997–2006:
  - Vol. I: Quaestiones super Porphyrius Isagoge et Aristoteles Categoriae, Franciscan Institute Publications, 1999. ISBN 978-1-57659-121-5
  - Vol. II: Quaestiones super Peri hermeneias et Sophistici Elenchis (along with) Theoremata, Franciscan Institute Publications, 2004, ISBN 978-1-57659-122-2.
  - Vol. III-IV: Quaestiones super libros Metaphysicorum Aristotelis Franciscan Institute Publications, 2004. ISBN 978-1-57659-124-6.
  - Vol. V: Quaestiones super Secundum et Tertium de Anima. Franciscan Institute Publications, 2006. ISBN 978-0-8132-1422-1.
- The Examined Report of the Paris Lecture, Reportatio I-A, Volume 1, edited and translated by Allan B. Wolter, OFM and Oleg Bychkov. Franciscan Institute Publications, 2004 ISBN 978-1-57659-193-2
- The Examined Report of the Paris Lecture, Reportatio I-A, Volume 2, edited and translated by Allan B. Wolter, OFM and Oleg Bychkov. Franciscan Institute Publications, 2008. ISBN 978-1-57659-150-5

English translations

- John Duns Scotus, A Treatise on God as First Principle. Chicago: Franciscan Herald Press 1982. A Latin text and English translation of the De Primo Principio. Second edition, revised, with a commentary by Allan Wolter, (First edition 1966).
- John Duns Scotus, God and Creatures. The Quodlibetal Questions, Translated by Wolter, Allan B., OFM, and Felix Alluntis, Washington, D.C.: The Catholic University of America Press, 1975.
- Duns Scotus on the Will and Morality, Translated by Wolter, Allan B., OFM, Washington, DC: The Catholic University of America Press, 1986.
- Duns Scotus: Philosophical Writings, Translated by Wolter, Allan B., OFM, Indianapolis: Hackett Publishing Company, 1987.
- Duns Scotus' Parisian Proof for the Existence of God, edited By Allan B. Wolter and Marilyn McCord Adams, Franciscan Studies 42, 1982, pp. 248–321. (Latin text and English translation).
- John Duns Scotus, Contingency and Freedom. Lectura I 39, translation, commentary and introduction by A. Vos Jaczn, H. Veldhuis, A.H. Looman-Graaskamp, E. Dekker and N.W. den Bok. The New Synthese Historical Library 4. Dordrecht/Boston/London: Kluwer, 1994.
- Questions on the Metaphysics of Aristotle by John Duns Scotus, Translated by Etzkorn, Girard J., and Allan B. Wolter, OFM, St. Bonaventure, NY: The Franciscan Institute, 1997–1998.
- John Duns Scotus. Four Questions on Mary, Introduction with Latin text and English translation and notes by Allan B. Wolter, OFM, Franciscan Institute Publications, 2000.
- John Duns Scotus. A Treatise on Potency and Act. Questions on the Metaphysics of Aristotle Book IX, Introduction with Latin text and English translation and notes by Allan B. Wolter, OFM, Franciscan Institute Publications, 2000.
- John Duns Scotus. Political and Economic Philosophy, Introduction with Latin text and English translation and notes by Allan B. Wolter, OFM, Franciscan Institute Publications, 2001.
- Duns Scotus on Divine Love: Texts and Commentary on Goodness and Freedom, God and Humans, translated by A. Vos, H. Veldhuis, E. Dekker, N.W. den Bok and A.J. Beck (ed.). Aldershot: Ashgate 2003.
- John Duns Scotus. Early Oxford Lecture on Individuation, Introduction with Latin text and English translation and notes by Allan B. Wolter, OFM, Franciscan Institute Publications, 2005.
- John Duns Scotus. Questions on Aristotle's Categories, Translated by Lloyd A. Newton, Washington, DC: Catholic University of America Press, 2014.
- Duns Scotus on Time and Existence: The Questions on Aristotle's "De interpretatione", Translated with Introduction and Commentary by Edward Buckner and Jack Zupko, Washington, DC: Catholic University of America Press, 2014.

== See also ==
- Oxford Franciscan school
- Virgin and Child with Saint Anne – Early depictions of the Immaculate Conception in three generations
