= Defensor pacis =

Treatise by Marsilius of Padua

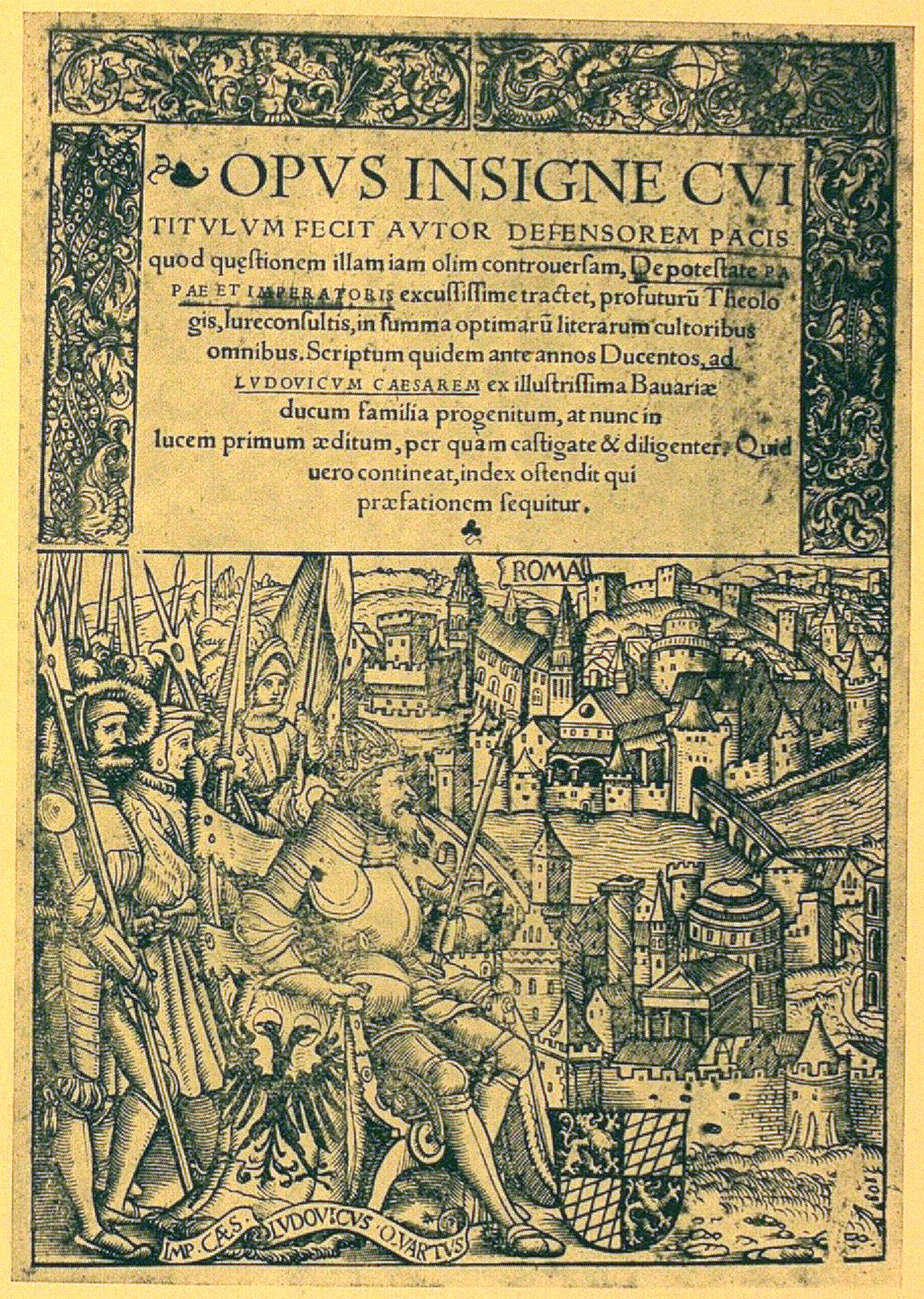
Defensor pacis

The tract Defensor pacis (The Defender of Peace) laid the foundations of modern doctrines of popular sovereignty. It was written by Marsilius of Padua (Italian: Marsilio da Padova), an Italian medieval scholar. It appeared in 1324 and provoked a storm of controversy that lasted through the century. The context of the work lies in the political struggle between Louis IV, Holy Roman Emperor and Pope John XXII. The treatise is vehemently anticlerical. Marsilius' work was censured by Pope Benedict XII and Pope Clement VI.

Defensor pacis extends the tradition of Dante's De Monarchia separating the secular State from religious authority. It affirmed the sovereignty of the people and civil law and sought to greatly limit the power of the Papacy, which he viewed as the "cause of the trouble which prevails among men" and which he characterized as a "fictitious" power. He proposed the seizure of church property by civil authority and the elimination of tithes. In his view, the Papacy would retain only an honorary pre-eminence without any authority to interpret the scriptures or define dogma.

As its name implies, it describes the State as the defender of the public peace, which is the most indispensable benefit of human society. The author of the law expresses the will of the people, not of the whole populace, but of the most important part (valentior) of the citizens; these people should themselves elect, or at least appoint, the head of the government, who, lest he should be tempted to put himself above the scope of the laws, should have at his disposal only a limited armed force. This chief is responsible to the people for his breaches of the law, and in serious cases they can sentence him to death. The real cause of the trouble which prevails among men is the Papacy, the development of which is the result of a series of usurpations.

Marsilius denies, not only to the pope, but to the bishops and clergy, any coercive jurisdiction or any right to pronounce in temporal matters. He also denies episcopal authority of excommunications and interdicts, or other imposed interpretations of divine law. He is not opposed to penalties against heretics, but he would have them pronounced only by civil tribunals. Desiring to see the clergy practice a holy poverty, he proposes the suppression of tithes and the seizure by the secular power of the greater part of the property of the church. The clergy, thus deprived of its wealth, privileges and jurisdiction, is further to be deprived of independence, for the civil power is to have the right of appointing to benefices, etc. The supreme authority in the church is to be the council, but a council summoned by the emperor.

Some of the ideas about the nature of the Church were denounced as heretical by John XXII:

1. Christ surrendered to the Roman authorities because he was coerced by a secular ruler
2. The apostle Peter did not have any special authority
3. The Emperor can appoint or remove the pope
4. Priests are equal in spiritual authority, and any rank among the clergy is bestowed by secular powers
5. The Church can not impose coercive punishments without imperial permission

The pope, no longer possessing any more power than other bishops (though Marsilius recognizes that the supremacy of the See of Rome goes back to the earliest times of Christianity), is to content himself with a pre-eminence mainly of an honorary kind, without claiming to interpret the Holy Scriptures, define dogmas or distribute benefices; moreover, he is to be elected by the Christian people, or by the delegates of the people, i.e. the princes, or by the council, and these are also to have the power to punish, suspend or depose him. The theory was purely democratic, but was all ready to be transformed, by means of a series of fictions and implications, into an imperialist doctrine; and in like manner it contained a visionary plan of reformation which ended, not in the separation of the church from the state, but in the subjection of the church to the state.

In 1535, Thomas Cromwell paid William Marshall to translate Defensor into English in order to give intellectual support towards the implementation of Royal Supremacy.

== See also ==
- Separation of church and state (medieval)
- A Dispute Between a Priest and a Knight
- Tractatus Eboracenses
- Defensor minor
