= Auctoritates Aristotelis =

Medieval florilegium

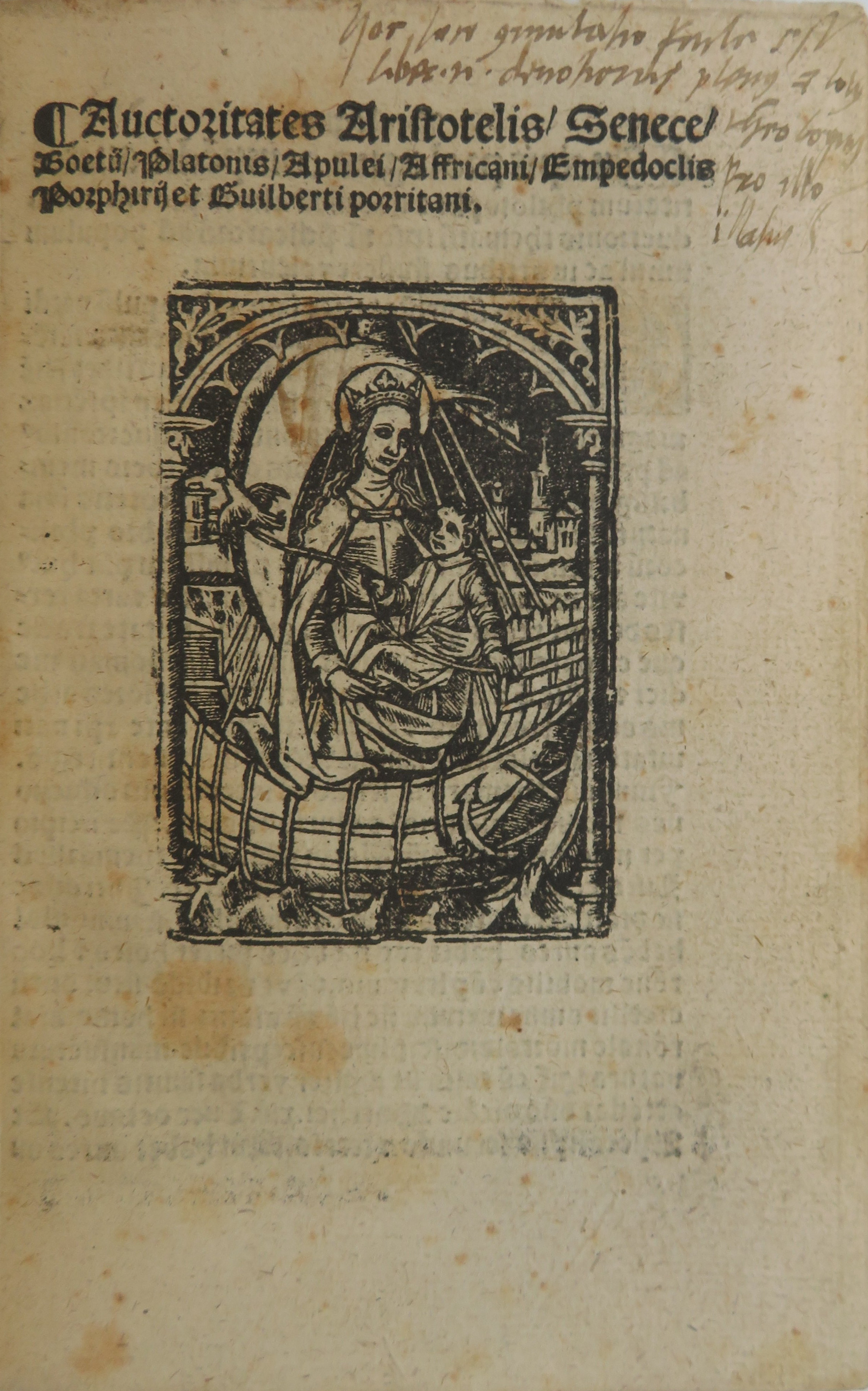

The Auctoritates Aristotelis ("Authoritative [passages of] Aristotle") was a popular florilegium (anthology of brief extracts) probably composed around the end of the thirteenth century. In the manuscripts, it was entitled Parvi flores (little flowers), but, when it was printed in the las years of the fifteenth century and in the first quarter of the sixteenth, the title became Auctoritates Aristotelis, Senecae, Boethii, Platonis, Appulei, Empedoclis, Porphyrii et Gilberti Porretani or, for some Italian editions, Propositiones universales Aristotelis et aliorum philosophorum.

This large collection of sententiae (opinions) derived from scholastic texts was compiled around 1300.

In 1974, Jacqueline Hamesse proposed, "in the absence of other information", to consider Marsilius of Padua as the most probable author of the collection, but by 1994, she had come to the conclusion that the author was Johannes de Fonte, a Franciscan and lector in theology at the Franciscan convent in Montpellier.

Johannes de Fonte says in the prologue that his work is intended to provide assistance “as much for preaching to the people as study of the arts.” The work enjoyed a wide circulation, providing a convenient way to access Aristotle's philosophy, or to embellish a composition or sermon with quotations from his work.

The Auctoritates Aristotelis are of great importance in the formation of the first act of the Spanish novel in dialogues La Celestina.

== Sources ==
- Jacqueline Hamesse, Les auctoritates Aristotelis, Louvain & Paris, 1974.
- Iñigo Ruiz Arzalluz, El mundo intelectual del antiguo autor: las ‘Auctoritates Aristotelis’ en la ‘Celestina’ primitiva, Boletín de la Real Academia Española, 76 (1996): 265-284.
