= Church and state in medieval Europe =

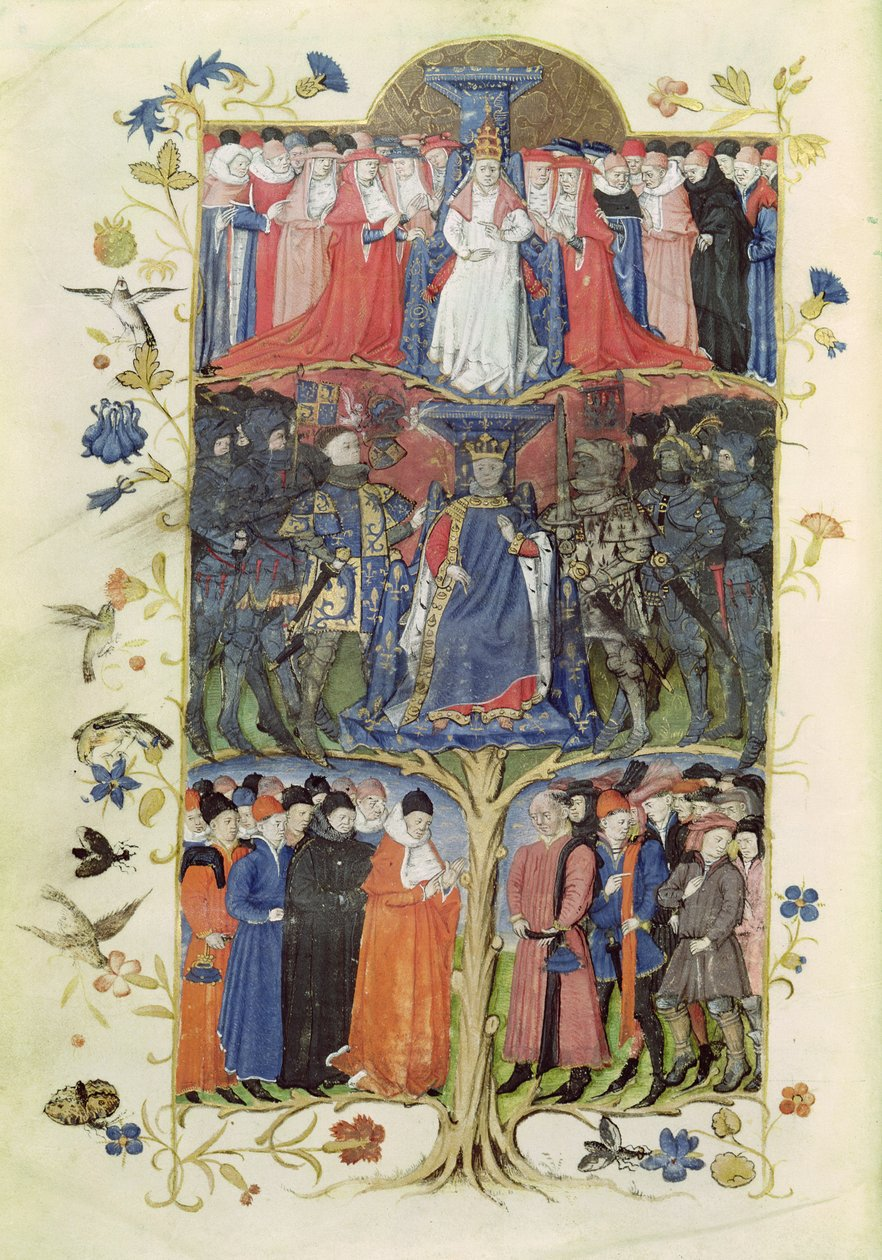
The traditional social stratification of the Occident in the 15th century

Church and state in medieval Europe was the relationship between the Catholic Church and the various monarchies and other states in Europe during the Middle Ages (between the end of Roman authority in the West in the fifth century to their end in the East in the fifteenth century and the beginning of the Modern era).

== Origins ==
Church gradually became a defining institution of the Roman Empire. Emperor Constantine issued the Edict of Milan in 313 proclaiming toleration for the Christian religion and summoned the First Council of Nicaea in 325 whose Nicene Creed included belief in "one, holy, catholic, and apostolic Church". Emperor Theodosius I made Nicene Christianity the state church of the Roman Empire with the Edict of Thessalonica of 380.

Pope Leo the Great defined the role of the state as being a defender of the church's cause and a suppressor of heresies in a letter to the Eastern Roman Emperor Leo I: "You ought unhesitatingly to recognize that the Royal Power has been conferred to you not only for the Rule of the world, but especially for the defense of the Church, so that by suppressing the heinous undertakings you may defend those Statutes which are good and restore True Peace to those things which have been disordered".

After the fall of the Roman Empire in the 5th century, there emerged no single powerful secular government in the West. There was however a central ecclesiastical power in Rome, the Catholic Church. In this power vacuum, the church rose to become the dominant power in the West. The church started expanding in the 10th century, and as secular kingdoms gained power at the same time, there naturally arose the conditions for a power struggle between church and state over ultimate authority.

The earliest vision of Christendom was a vision of a Christian theocracy, a government founded upon and upholding Christian doctrine, whose institutions uphold Christian values. In this period, members of the Christian clergy wield political authority. The specific relationship between the political leaders and the clergy varied but, in theory, the national and political divisions were at times subsumed under the leadership of the Catholic Church as an institution. This model of Church–State relations was accepted by various Church leaders and political leaders in European history.

The classical heritage flourished throughout the Middle Ages in both the Byzantine Greek East and the Latin West. In the Greek philosopher Plato's ideal state there are three major classes, which was representative of the idea of the "tripartite soul", which is expressive of three functions or capacities of the human soul: "reason", "the spirited element", and "appetites" (or "passions"). Will Durant made a case that certain prominent features of Plato's ideal community were discernible in the organization, dogma and effectiveness of "the" Medieval Church in Europe:

... For a thousand years Europe was ruled by an order of guardians considerably like that which was visioned by our philosopher. During the Middle Ages it was customary to classify the population of Christendom into laboratores (workers), bellatores (soldiers), and oratores (clergy). The last group, though small in number, monopolized the instruments and opportunities of culture, and ruled with almost unlimited sway half of the most powerful continent on the globe. The clergy, like Plato's guardians, were placed in authority... by their talent as shown in ecclesiastical studies and administration, by their disposition to a life of meditation and simplicity, and ... by the influence of their relatives with the powers of state and church. In the latter half of the period in which they ruled [800 AD onwards], the clergy were as free from family cares as even Plato could desire [for such guardians]... [Clerical] Celibacy was part of the psychological structure of the power of the clergy; for on the one hand they were unimpeded by the narrowing egoism of the family, and on the other their apparent superiority to the call of the flesh added to the awe in which lay sinners held them.... In the latter half of the period in which they ruled, the clergy were as free from family cares as even Plato could desire.

The Catholic Church's peak of authority over all European Christians and their common endeavours of the Christian community — for example, the Crusades, the fight against the Moors in the Iberian Peninsula and against the Ottomans in the Balkans — helped to develop a sense of communal identity against the obstacle of Europe's deep political divisions. This authority was also used by local Inquisitions to root out divergent elements and create a religiously uniform community.

The conflict between Church and state was in many ways a uniquely Western phenomenon originating in Late Antiquity (see Saint Augustine's City of God (417)). The Papal States in Italy, today downsized to the State of Vatican, were ruled directly by the Holy See. Moreover, throughout the Middle Ages the Pope claimed the right to depose the Catholic kings of Western Europe, and tried to exercise it, sometimes successfully (see the investiture controversy, below), sometimes not, as with Henry VIII of England and Henry III of Navarre. However, in the Eastern Roman Empire, also known as the Byzantine Empire, Church and state were closely linked and collaborated in a "symphony", with some exceptions (see Iconoclasm).

Before the Age of Absolutism, institutions, such as the Church, legislatures, or social elites, restrained monarchical power. Absolutism was characterized by the ending of feudal partitioning, consolidation of power with the monarch, rise of the state, rise of professional standing armies, creation of professional bureaucracies, codification of state laws, and the rise of ideologies that justify the absolutist monarchy. Hence, absolutism was made possible by new innovations and characterized as a phenomenon of Early Modern Europe, rather than that of the Middle Ages, where the clergy and nobility counterbalanced as a result of mutual rivalry.

== Historical events ==
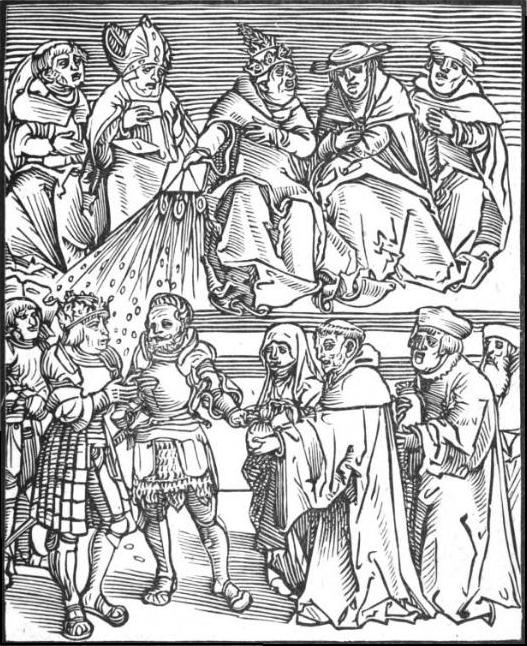
Antichristus, a woodcut by Lucas Cranach the Elder of the pope using the temporal power to grant authority to a generously contributing ruler

=== Investiture controversy ===
When the Holy Roman Empire developed as a force from the tenth century, it was the first real non-barbarian challenge to the authority of the Church. A dispute between the secular and ecclesiastical powers emerged known as the Investiture Controversy, beginning in the mid-eleventh century and was resolved with the Concordat of Worms in 1122. While on the surface it was over a matter of official procedures regarding the appointments of offices, underneath was a powerful struggle for control over who held ultimate authority, the King or the Pope.

=== Philip the Fair ===
Pope Boniface VIII put some of the strongest claims to temporal as well as spiritual supremacy of any Pope and intervened incessantly in foreign affairs. He proclaimed that it "is necessary for salvation that every living creature be under submission to the Roman pontiff", pushing Papal Supremacy to its historical extreme. Boniface's quarrel with Philip the Fair became so resentful that he excommunicated him in 1303. However, before the Pope could lay France under an interdict, Boniface was seized by Philip. Although he was released from captivity after three days, he died of shock one month later. No subsequent popes were to repeat Boniface VIII's claims.

=== Thomas Becket ===
Although initially close to King Henry II, as Archbishop of Canterbury Thomas Becket became an independent figure. King Henry devoted his reign to the restoration of the royal customs of his grandfather King Henry I, as part of this he wanted to extend his authority over the Church and limit its freedoms. The Becket dispute revolved around the Constitutions of Clarendon, a document which Becket and the Pope largely condemned. Becket eventually fled England and went into exile in France; during these six years there were a number of attempts at restoring peace. The fourth meeting at Fréteval ended in an agreement and Becket decided to return to Canterbury. However the King reneged on his promises made at Fréteval and in response Becket produced a number of censures on royal officials and clergymen. Four barons of the King sought to gain the King's favour and therefore proceeded to Canterbury Cathedral to confront Becket; some claim that they intended to scare and possibly arrest Becket rather than to kill him. Nonetheless after a heated argument the four barons murdered Becket on the steps of the altar in Canterbury Cathedral. The King publicly expressed remorse for this killing, but took no action to arrest Becket's killers. He attended Canterbury in sackcloth and ashes as an act of public penance. Later in 1174 he submitted himself before the tomb of Thomas Becket, thus recognizing St. Thomas's sanctity.

=== King John and Innocent III ===
A further conflict between the English monarchy and the papacy occurred during the reign of John, King of England. A dispute arose over the appointment of the Archbishop of Canterbury after Pope Innocent III supported Stephen Langton for the position and John refused to accept him. In response, Innocent placed England under an interdict in 1208, restricting the celebration of church services, and excommunicated John in 1209.

The dispute continued until 1213, when John submitted to the pope and was subsequently absolved from excommunication. The interdict remained in effect until 1214.

=== Guelphs and Ghibellines ===
The conflict between the Guelphs and Ghibellines began as part of the secular-papal struggle. Guelf (also spelled Guelph) and Ghibelline, were members of two opposing factions in German and Italian politics during the Middle Ages. The split between the Guelfs, who were sympathetic to the papacy, and the Ghibellines, who were sympathetic to the German (Holy Roman) emperors, contributed to chronic strife within the cities of northern Italy in the 13th and 14th centuries.

The division between Guelphs and Ghibellines was not simply a contest between supporters of papal and imperial authority. The conflict became intertwined with rivalries among Italian cities and competing factions within individual communes, where the labels could represent local political and familial interests as much as allegiance to pope or emperor. During the thirteenth century the wider struggle remained closely connected to the conflict between the papacy and the Hohenstaufen emperors. Frederick II's attempts to assert imperial authority in Italy intensified these divisions, while the papacy supported forces opposed to imperial expansion.

=== First Crusade ===
There was some uncertainty about what would happen to Jerusalem after it was conquered in 1099. Godfrey de Bouillon refused to take the title "king", and was instead called "Defender of the Holy Sepulcher". Dagobert of Pisa was named Patriarch in 1100, and attempted to turn the new state into a theocracy, with a secular state to be created elsewhere, perhaps in Cairo. Godfrey soon died however and was succeeded by his brother Baldwin, who did not hesitate to call himself king and actively opposed Dagobert's plans. By Dagobert's death in 1107, Jerusalem was a secular kingdom.

== See also ==
- Caesaropapism
- Christian anarchism
- Defensor pacis
- Dominium mundi
- Hierocracy (medieval)
- Imperial church system
- Papal appointment
- Separation of church and state
- Concordat of Worms
- The Norman Anonymous
- Precedence among European monarchies
- The clash between the Church and the Empire
