= Defensor minor =

Treatise by Marsilius of Padua

The Defensor minor is a work by Marsilius of Padua written around 1342. The Defensor minor is a restatement and defense of Marsilius's best known work, the Defensor pacis.

The text discusses civil and ecclesiastical jurisdiction, the confession, penance, indulgences, the Crusades, pilgrimages, plenitudo potestatis, legislative power, the origin of the sovereignty, wedding, and divorce.

== Civil jurisdiction ==
With regard to jurisdiction, Marsilius distinguishes between divine and human laws, the first event which is independent of any human will and on the conduct of man in view of the afterlife, the second which determines the will of the people, endowed with coercive power and not modifiable by any clergyman.

This applies also to the Pope that even with his decrees may waive the law, manifestation of the people's sovereignty. While the beneficiaries of the two laws are identical, its object and purpose are different. The one seeks the good of the soul and the other cares for earthly well-being, with the result that the church is denied the power to make laws, even in the persistent silence of human legislation. The same applies to amendments and changes, which should remain solely with the people. The only thing that is relevant to the clergy is the non-legal rules that affect morality and resolve themselves into simple counsels and take effect with counsellors.

== The clergy ==
The task and the main function of the clergy is to teach the sacred texts and preparing souls for the afterlife. The Church has repeatedly stated that for the sinner there is no other system of redemption from sin but confession. Marsilius, in an effort to bring man to God, regardless of any broker, says that confession should be done directly to God and that salvation comes only by true repentance. This anticipates what will be one of the tenets of Protestantism. The necessity of this Sacrament, that is only recommended and not required, is not detected from the Holy Scriptures. Only sincere repentance to the outside of any denominational can give that peace in the soul that is the prelude of eternal salvation. Absolution from sin belongs only to God and the priest, who may do so, does so only within the Church. Sufficit soli Deo confiteri peccata ipsa, videlicet recognoscendo, et de ipsis poenitendo cum proposito talia alterius non committendi. These words can be regarded as harbingers of what will be the principles of the Lutheran Reformation.

Sufficit sola contritio et vera poenitentia de commisso absque omni confessione facta vel fienda sacerdoti, ut immediate absolvatur per Deum. Marsilio does not exclude absolutely confession: he says only that it is useful but not essential, which it would be if it were a precept, therefore he also denies the priestly power to inflict penalties. Only contrition frees from sin, not repentance of any material or spiritual character almost like a compensation for the sin. Quamvis in hoc saeculo nullam realem aut personalem satisfactionem exhibeat pro peccatis.
