= Clash between the Church and the Empire =

Conflict between the papacy and Holy Roman Empire

From the time of Constantine I's conversion to Christianity in the 4th century, the question of the relationship between temporal and spiritual power was constant, causing a clash between the Church and the Empire. The decline of imperial power initially allowed the pope to assert greater independence. However, beginning in 962, the Holy Roman Emperor assumed control over papal elections and the appointment of bishops, reinforcing imperial authority over the Church.

In response to this, the Gregorian Reform commenced in the mid-11th century. By 1059, Pope Nicholas II had transferred the election of the pope to the college of cardinals. In 1075, Gregory VII proclaimed the dictatus papae, asserting papal supremacy and removing bishops from imperial appointment. This initiated a period of conflict known as the Investiture Dispute, highlighted by Henry IV's excommunication and his subsequent penance at Canossa. At the end of this conflict, the Pope succeeded in freeing himself from imperial guardianship. In 1122, under the Concordat of Worms, the Emperor agreed to the free election of bishops, reserving the right to give prelates temporal investiture. This compromise marked the defeat of the Empire.

The issue of Church and state relations reemerged during the reigns of Frederick Barbarossa and Frederick II, escalating into more intense confrontations. Despite significant weakening of the Holy Roman Empire during this time, the Papacy faced challenges in its attempts to establish a global theocracy. The conflict with the Holy Roman Empire would be succeeded by a new one with the Kingdom of France which forced the Pope to resettle to Avignon and later escalated in the Western Schism and Italian Wars.

== The theocratic temptation ==
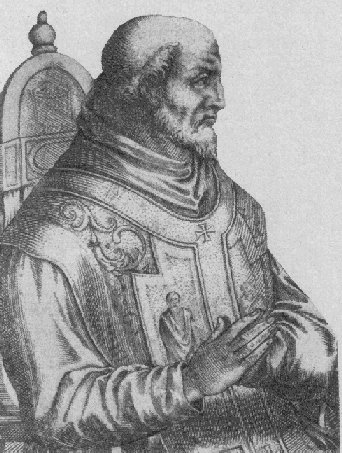
Innocent II

In the 12th century, following the Gregorian Reform, the Holy Roman Emperor lost the ability to control papal elections, leading to a resurgence of the Roman nobility's attempts to reclaim their former privileges. This power struggle intensified with the death of Pope Honorius II, resulting in clashes among various Roman factions.

The death of Henry V in 1125 marked the end of the Salian dynasty at the head of the Holy Roman Empire. The new emperor, Lothaire of Supplinburg, was known for his loyalty to the Papacy. The Pope called upon Lothaire to assist in countering the claims of Roger II of Sicily, who posed a threat to papal territories.

On February 1, 1130, Pope Innocent II was elected, but some of the cardinals elected an antipope, Cardinal Pierleoni, who took the name of Anacletus II. Threatened by Anaclet's schism, which lasted 8 years, Innocent II regained his power only with the support of France, England and the Emperor.

Over time, the Papacy began to interpret Lothaire's actions—initially seen as gestures of deference—as signs of the Empire's submission. In Liege in 1131, Lothaire took the pope's horse by the bridle, and in 1133, he was presented with a ring signifying that he took Tuscany from the Holy See. Papal propaganda depicted Lothaire as the pope's squire, with frescoes showing him humbly kneeling to receive a crown from Innocent II.

In 1139, Innocent II organized the second Lateran Council, asserting the Papacy's aspiration for global authority and its claim over the imperial crown. The Council proclaimed: "Rome is at the head of the world", reinforcing the developing theocratic doctrine that subordinated secular affairs to spiritual authority.

In Italy, Arnold of Brescia defended the idea of total poverty and wanted to force the Pope to renounce all his temporal powers. Although condemned for heresy in 1140, he joined a republican revolt that drove the pope and his cardinals out of Rome in 1145. Rome was plagued by endemic power struggles. Pope Eugene III had to resort to force, and thus to Emperor Frederick Barbarossa. At Konstanz in 1153, the two men signed an agreement. In exchange for the Pope's reconquest of the Papal States, he agreed to crown Barbarossa emperor. Rome was recaptured in 1155. Barbarossa was crowned by Adrian IV the day after he entered the city, on June 18, 1155. Despite this exchange, tensions between the Papacy and the Empire persisted, and Rome remained unstable. The Pope, claiming dominium mundi, struggled to maintain control over his capital.

The situation escalated when, in 1157, at the Diet of Besançon, where the Pope's legate, Orlando Bandinelli (later Pope Alexander III), stated that "Rome is so well disposed towards Frederick that it would grant him even greater beneficia". The term "beneficia" can mean both benefit and fief, implying a potential subservience of the Emperor to the Pope. This declaration nearly resulted in the legate's death, as it was perceived as an affront in the feudal context. This incident marked the rupture between the Papacy and Frederick Barbarossa, initiating a more violent phase in the struggle between the Church and the Empire.

The Pope's aspirations for dominium mundi faced challenges beyond the Empire; in England, King Henry II successfully maintained control over the English Church, while some clerics within the Church questioned the superiority of papal authority over that of secular princes.

== The conflict between Frederick Barbarossa and the Pope ==
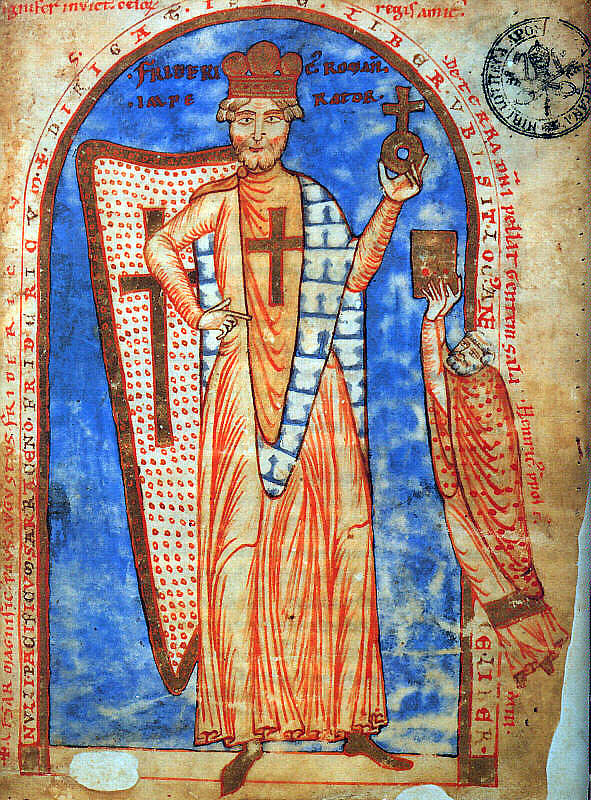
Barbarossa dressed as a crusader. Miniature from 1188

During this period, two prominent factions were engaged in conflict within the Holy Roman Empire: the Guelphs, and the Ghibellines. The Guelphs, whose name is derived from the Bavarian ducal family, supported the Papacy, while the Ghibellines, named after Waiblingen, the ancestral fief of the Hohenstaufen dynasty, backed the Emperor.

Frederick wanted to restore imperial power. The revival of Roman law enabled him to revive the idea of the state and the superiority of the power of the temporal sovereign. He was supported in his fight against the Holy See by his chancellor, Rainald of Dassel, who urged him to break with the papacy, and by German princes and prelates. Through a bold interpretation of the Concordat of Worms, he succeeded in taking control of the German clergy. Frederick asserted control over the German clergy, claiming the right to intervene in episcopal elections when disputes arose among electors. He also withheld temporal investiture from candidates he deemed unacceptable. As a result, he was able to impose his will in Augsburg in 1152, Worms in 1153, and even on the Pope in Magdeburg in 1154, effectively re-establishing bishops and abbots as "imperial officials." This jeopardized the balance of power established by the Concordat.

Frederick further asserted that the selection of the sovereign, viewed as divinely chosen, was the prerogative of the Empire's nobility, thereby diminishing the Pope's role in this process. After resolving issues within Germany, Frederick traveled to Italy in 1154, convening a Diet in Roncaglia to address grievances from Italian cities regarding Milan's dominance. In retaliation for its support of Milan, Frederick ordered the destruction Tortona.

In 1159, Alexander III was elected pope by a narrow majority of the conclave.

An antipope, Victor IV, was immediately elected, supported by the emperor. Alexander III had to flee Italy and took refuge in France. Open conflict erupted when Frederick Barbarossa sought to impose the imperial tax on Italian cities, which they refused. In 1162, Milan was destroyed and its inhabitants dispersed. This provoked the alliance of a number of towns to form the Lombard League, supported by Alexander III. Frederick Barbarossa had a new antipope elected each time the previous one disappeared. From the Würzburg Diet of 1165 onwards, all bishops in the Holy Roman Empire owed obedience to the antipope. Alexander III excommunicated the Emperor.

In 1167, Frederick's forces captured and pillaged Rome. However, with the army decimated by plague, he was forced to withdraw. At Legnano in 1176, he was defeated by the Italian cities. In 1177, he traveled to Venice, where he publicly submitted to the Pope and renounced his involvement in the papal elections. As a result, Alexander III lifted the excommunication against him, and Frederick agreed to serve as the Pope's squire. This reconciliation highlighted the potential benefits of cooperation between the Papacy and the Empire. Ultimately, Frederick's military losses, the impact of excommunication, and the rebellion of Italian cities thwarted his ambitions in Italy, at least temporarily.

In 1179, Pope Alexander III convened the Third Lateran Council to address issues stemming from the ongoing schism. To prevent further divisions, the council established that the pope would be elected by a two-thirds majority of the cardinals.

During this period, Emperor Frederick Barbarossa sought to reinforce his control over the Kingdom of Italy. He negotiated agreements with Italian cities and refused to return the inheritance of Tuscany, originally bequeathed to the Holy See by Matilda of Tuscany. Frederick also continued to appoint bishops and abbots in Germany, disregarding the original intent of the Concordat of Worms.

In 1186, Frederick married his son to the heiress of the Norman kingdom of Sicily, Constance, daughter of William II of Sicily. This union posed a geopolitical threat to the Papacy, as it indicated a potential encirclement of Papal influence.

After Frederick's accidental death during the Third Crusade, his son Henry VI prolonged the conflict with the Papacy over the question of Sicilian inheritance. After the death of William II, the Norman nobility chose Tancred, nephew of Constance, as king, with papal support. However, Tancred's reign was short-lived, and upon his death in 1194, Henry VI seized Sicily, refusing to swear vassalage to the Pope for his Norman possessions. He aimed to integrate Sicily into his empire but died before he could fully implement his plans.

This series of events led to the formation of urban leagues in Italy, such as the Lombard League, usually supported by the pope, and struggles between the Guelphs and the Ghibellines. After the death of Frederick II in 1250, the Holy Roman Empire entered a period of anarchy, the Great Interregnum from 1250 to 1273.

During this time, a political doctrine known as Caesaropapism gained prominence, advocating for the fusion of spiritual and temporal powers under the emperor, specifically the Emperor of the West. Although elements of this doctrine were evident during the Investiture Controversy, it became a focal point of political discourse during the Great Interregnum. In contrast, the Papacy emphasized theocratic governance, asserting that the Pope should hold both spiritual and temporal authority, thereby subordinating civil power to religious power. This clash of ideologies highlighted the persistent and opposing nature of the relationship between popes and emperors.

== The conflict between Frederick II and the Pope ==
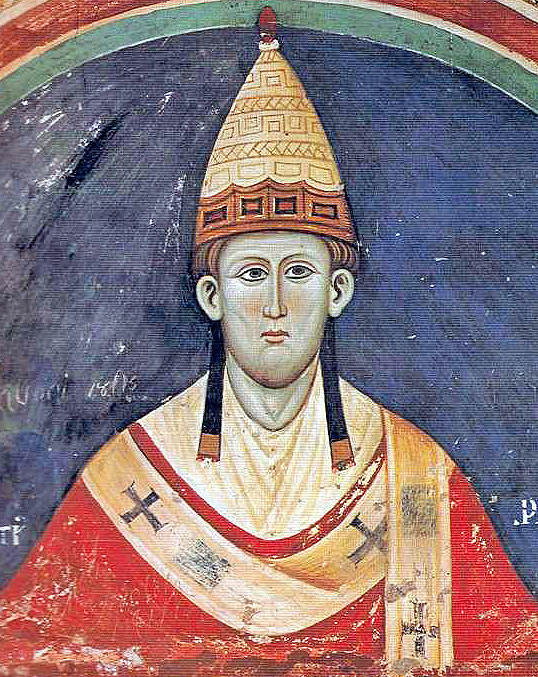
Innocent III, fresco in the Benedictine cloister at Subiaco.

In 1198, Lothaire de Segni was elected Pope under the name of Innocent III. He supported the idea that the pope alone possessed full sovereignty (the auctoritas of the Romans), while princes held potestas, a political power granted to them directly by God. According to Innocent III, rulers were inherently subject to papal authority, as were national churches. His doctrine was more nuanced than the dictatus papae of the Gregorian reform, allowing for limited papal intervention in temporal matters under specific circumstances: grave sins committed by rulers, situations lacking other authoritative jurisdiction, and the defense of ecclesiastical property.

Innocent III sought to reassert his authority over Rome and his territories. He effectively dismantled the remnants of the Roman Republic by securing the resignation of the municipality and the dismissal of officials appointed by the republican senate.

The Prefect of Rome, previously an agent of the emperor, was transformed into an official of the Holy See. These actions incited a revolt among the nobility, and it took Innocent approximately six years to regain control of the city. Concurrently, he succeeded in acquiring Countess Matilda's inheritance, which included the March of Ancona, Campania, and the Duchy of Spoleto.

Innocent III also capitalized on the rivalries between the Hohenstaufen dynasty, associated with the late emperor, and the Welfs. Following the death of Henry VI, the German princes were divided over his succession. The Welfs elected Otto of Brunswick, while the majority of Hohenstaufen supporters opted for Philip of Swabia, Henry's brother.

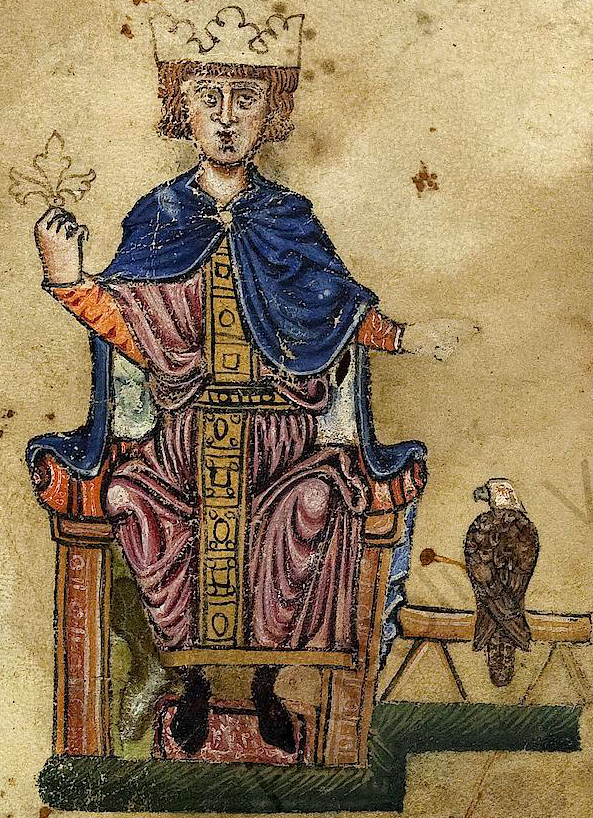
Frederick II and his falcon depicted in his book De arte venandi cum avibus (The art of hunting with birds), 13th century.

Innocent III took advantage of the internal divisions within the Holy Roman Empire to assert the superior rights of the papacy. In the decretal Per Venerabilem of 1202, he declared that the final decision in the event of a challenge to the imperial election rested with the pope. At first, he favored the Welf Otto IV, who, to gain papal support, had promised him total sovereignty over the Church states, plus the exarchate of Ravenna, the estates of Countess Matilda, the march of Ancona, the duchy of Spoleto and recognition of his sovereignty over Sicily. However, once Otto IV consolidated his power, he reneged on these promises and acted like previous emperors. In response, Innocent III excommunicated him in 1210 and endorsed the rise of Frederick II, a ward of the pope and the grandson of Frederick Barbarossa. Innocent III intervened repeatedly in the choice of emperors. Frederick II was crowned king at Aachen in 1215 after assuring the pope that he would uphold the rights of the Church and maintain a separation between the German and Sicilian kingdoms.

Frederick's travels to Germany in 1212 granted greater freedom to the princes. Through two significant acts—the Statutum in favorem principum for temporal princes and the Confoederatio cum principibus ecclesiasticis for ecclesiastics—Frederick II secured essential rights to gain their support. He wanted his son Henry to be elected and recognized as his successor. These privileges formed the legal foundation for the princes to build their autonomous power, marking the beginning of the formation of states within the imperial territories in the later Middle Ages. This movement contributed to the weakening of imperial power in favor of the prince-electors, a process that would be codified in the Golden Bull of 1356. Under the Statutum in favorem principum, the princes were granted the right to mint coins and establish customs. Frederick II also granted princes the right to legislate. The emperors, in their struggle for influence during each election, increasingly allied with the prince-electors, offering them greater privileges at the expense of central authority, already weakened by the investiture controversy.

Innocent III also pioneered the concept of "political crusades," a strategy adopted by his successors. He articulated the right to "exposure of prey," which permitted the pope to authorize Catholics to seize lands from those who failed to suppress heresy. His successors would leverage this principle to exert control over the emperors. Additionally, Innocent III utilized the remaining funds from the decima paid by the French clergy for the Albigensian Crusade to wage war against Frederick II.

The latest episode in the struggle between the Church and the Empire pitted Frederick II against Popes Gregory IX and Innocent IV. As the heir to the Norman kingdom of Sicily, which he inherited from his mother, Frederick II sought to reorganize it into a centralized, modern state with ambitions to conquer the entirety of Italy. He placed his nine-year-old son on the German throne, setting the stage for inevitable conflict. Pope Gregory IX, reigning from 1227 to 1241, aimed to assert papal authority over the Hohenstaufens and excommunicated Frederick II in 1227 for failing to depart on a promised crusade in a timely manner.

When Frederick II left for the East, Gregory IX forbade the Knights Templar and the Hospitallers of the Order of St. John of Jerusalem to help the Emperor in his reconquest of the Holy Land, forcing the latter to negotiate an agreement with the Sultan Al-Kamil, without fighting. This led to the signing of the Treaty of Jaffa in February 1229, under which Frederick II took possession of the city and kingdom of Jerusalem. This maneuver infuriated Pope Gregory IX, who responded by launching an army against Frederick, financed by taxes on clergy incomes and funds from the Albigensian crusade. The papal army initially succeeded in overcoming resistance at Monte Cassin and advanced into Apulia but was forced to retreat in June.

In 1230, following the defeat of the papal army, Frederick obtained a temporary lifting of his excommunication in exchange for material compensation.

As soon as he was absolved, Frederick waged a fierce battle against the Pope. In the Liber Augustalis, also known as the Constitutions of Melfi, his jurists developed the idea that the ruler was the absolute master of his kingdom, and denounced the Pope's claim to rule the world. Amidst this turmoil, Frederick faced a new revolt from the Lombard cities, which were covertly supported by the Pope, as well as a rebellion from German princes led by his son Henry, whom he had appointed to lead Germany. In response, Frederick placed another son, Conrad, in charge and had him crowned King of the Romans in 1237. Frederick II triumphed over the Lombard League on November 27, 1237, at Cortenuova. Confident of his strength, he then offended the Pope, claiming part of the Lombard cities and writing to the Romans to remind them of their former greatness under the Roman Empire. In 1239, he wanted to place his bastard son, Enzio, at the head of Sardinia. Conflict resumed between the Emperor and the Pope.

Frederick II was excommunicated a second time in 1239. Pope Gregory IX mounted a significant campaign against him, promising crusader privileges to soldiers who fought on his behalf, even inviting Hungarians who had vowed to take part in a crusade to redirect their efforts against Frederick II. The Pope denounced Frederick as the Antichrist, and opposition to him intensified.

In March 1240, Frederick began his invasion of the Papal States, which included Lazio, Umbria and Marche. He marched on Rome in 1241 to prevent a council from being held to approve a new excommunication requested by Pope Gregory IX. However, Pope Gregory IX died on August 22, 1241, before the council could convene, allowing Frederick to temporarily lift the siege of Rome while maintaining control over the Papal States. The newly elected Pope Innocent IV resumed the struggle. He called on the Germans and Italians to crusade against the Emperor, but was forced to take refuge in Lyon, where he convened a council in 1245. At this council, he deposed Frederick II and released his subjects from their oaths of loyalty, thereby asserting papal authority over both spiritual and temporal realms. The Council of Lyon marked a significant moment in the development of papal theocracy.

The battle continued until Frederick II's death in 1250, turning Italy into a battlefield between Guelphs and Ghibellines. Despite his deposition—which no European monarch accepted—and some setbacks in northern Italy, Frederick was not defeated, indeed far from it. For the greater part of his reign, Frederick was arguably the most powerful monarch in Europe, and certainly the most prestigious. For his many-sided activities, dynamic personality and talents Frederick II has been called the greatest of all the German emperors, perhaps even of all medieval rulers. His intrepid defiance of the papacy marked an important diminishment of the papacy's power and status, even in the face of his dynasty's eventual collapse. After overcoming several reverses, he was on the verge of consolidating his authority in northern Italy at the time of his death in Apulia and it seemed likely that he would finally march on Lyon against the pope.

== Interregnum ==
Frederick II had been wildly successful again during the year of 1250 and across Italy and Germany, the imperial cause had reversed its losses during 1248–1249. Everywhere Innocent IV's cause looked dire: Frederick's lieutenants had secured the greater part of Italy including the Romagna, Tuscany, and most of Lombardy and Frederick's son Conrad IV, King of Germany had routed the papal anti-king William II of Holland and forced the bishops of the Rhineland into a truce. Always it must be reiterated that, while he lived, the emperor and the imperial cause were nearly always in the ascendant. Only Frederick's sudden death later in the year gave the papacy its opportunity in the very jaws of defeat. Innocent, eager to put an end to the Hohenstaufens, excommunicated Conrad IV and preached a crusade against him. Conrad IV died in 1254, leaving the Empire without a ruler until 1273—a period known as the Great Interregnum. The Great Interregnum allowed German princes and cities to gain substantial independence from central authority, leading to a fragmented political landscape. This state of affairs was later formalized by the emperors, particularly Charles IV, through the Golden Bull of 1356. The next king to be crowned emperor was Henry VII in 1312.

However, the papacy's seeming triumph was very short-lived. It faced rising challenges from emerging national monarchies especially France which rose to become a European great power and ultimately suffered a significant setback following the attack on Anagni in 1303 by King Philip of France. The dispute with the empire would escalate again under Louis IV who was excommunicated and took the imperial crown without papal permission in 1328.

The conflict shortly be revived in the 1519 imperial election, when Pope Leo X unsuccessfully backed King Francis I of France, fearing to be sandwiched between Habsburg Naples and Northern Italy as during Hohenstaufen times.

== See also ==
- Caesaropapism
- Church and state in medieval Europe
- Hierocracy (medieval)
- History of Germany
- Pope Gregory IX
- Guelphs and Ghibellines
- Pope Innocent IV
- Investiture controversy
- Interregnum
- Italienzug
- Papal deposing power
- Political theology
- Theocracy

== Bibliography ==
- Balard, Michel; Genêt, Jean-Philippe; Rouche, Michel (1973). Des Barbares à la Renaissance. Hachette. ISBN 978-2-87673-415-9.
- Chélini, Jean (1991). Histoire religieuse de l'Occident médiéval (in French). Paris: Hachette. ISBN 2-01-279074-7.
- J.-P. Cuvillier, L'Allemagne médiévale, tome 1 : Naissance d'un État (7th century - 8th century Payot, 1979.
- A. Fliche et V. Martin, Histoire de l'Église, des origines jusqu'à nous jours, Bloud & Gay
- A. Fliche, R. Foreville, J. Rousset de Pina, volume 9, Du premier concile de Latran à l'avènement d'Innocent III (1123-1198), 2 volumes, Bloud & Gay, Paris, 1944 et 1953. ASIN B0000DP6RD
- A. Fliche, C. Thouzellier, Y. Azaïs, volume 10, La Chrétienté romaine (1198-1274), Bloud & Gay, Paris, 1950.
- Robert Folz, L'Idée d'Empire en Occident from the 5th to the 14th century, Aubier, Paris, 1953.
- Patrick Gilli et Julien Théry, "Le combat contre les Hohenstaufen et leurs alliés", in Le gouvernement pontifical et l'Italie des villes au temps de la théocratie, Montpellier, Presses universitaires de la Méditerranée, 2010, p. 73-90.
- E Jordan, L'Allemagne et l'Italie aux aux xiie siècle et xiiie siècles, Presses universitaires de France, Paris, 1937–1939.
- Marcel Pacaut, Histoire de la papauté de l'origine au concile de Trente, Fayard, 1976. ISBN 2213002991
- Marcel Pacaut, Frédéric Barberousse, Fayard, Nouvelle édition augmentée, 1991, ISBN 2213027544
- Marcel Pacaut, La Théocratie, l'Église et le pouvoir au Moyen ge, Aubier, 1957. ASIN B0000DOG7K
- Marcel Pacaut, La Théocratie, Desclée, Paris, 1989. ISBN 2718904380
- Francis Rapp, Le Saint-Empire romain germanique, d'Othon le Grand à Charles Quint, Point Histoire, Seuil, 2003. ISBN 2020555271
- J. Schillinger, Le Saint-Empire, Ellipses, 2002. ISBN 272980868X
- André Vauchez, Apogée de la papauté et expansion de la chrétienté, tome 5 de l'Histoire du christianisme, Desclée, 1991–2001. ISBN 2-718-90573-5
- Morrisson, Cécile (2006). Les Croisades. PUF.
- Moreau, Jean-Paul (2005). Disputes et conflits du christianisme dans l'empire romain et l'occident médiéval. L'Harmattan.
- Schneidmüller, Bernd (2010). "Kaiser sein im spätmittelalterlichen Europa" (PDF). Spielregeln der Mächtigen (in German). Wissenschaftliche Buchgesellschaft. pp. 265–290. ISBN 9783534230143.
