= Francesco della Rossa Bartholi =

Italian Franciscan chronicler

Francesco della Rossa Bartholi (died c. 1372) was an Italian Franciscan chronicler.

== Life ==
Little is known of his life save what may be gathered from his own writings. A native of Assisi, he is found in 1312 as a student in Perugia, and in 1316 at Cologne, whence he returned to Umbria bearing many relics, including those of St. Louis, King of France, given him by the latter's daughter, Princess Blanche, who had become a Poor Clare.

In 1320 and in 1326, he was lector of theology at the Porziuncula; in 1332, he was guardian at San Damiano; and in 1334 he was at the Sacro Convento. He appears to have lived to a great age.

He was acquainted with Marinus of Assisi, John of La Verna, Alvarus Pelagius and other well-known Franciscans. Whether he is to be identified with the Francesco Rubea who is mentioned among the partisans of Michael de Cesena or with the Franciscus de Assisio who was long imprisoned at Florence on a charge of heresy is a matter of conjecture.

== Works ==
Bartholi wrote several works including a history of the Passion. He is best known for his Tractatus de Indulgentiâ Sanctae Mariae de Portiunculâ composed about 1335. He spent many of his later years in retouching and completing this treatise, on the origin and evolution of the Indulgence of Portiuncula. It comprises a collection of the ecclesiastical information and popular legends then obtainable on the subject. It was first published by Paul Sabatier with a wealth of critical apparatus in the Collection d'Etudes" (Paris, 1900, Vol. II).
