= Augustinus Triumphus =

Italian hermit and writer (1243–1328)

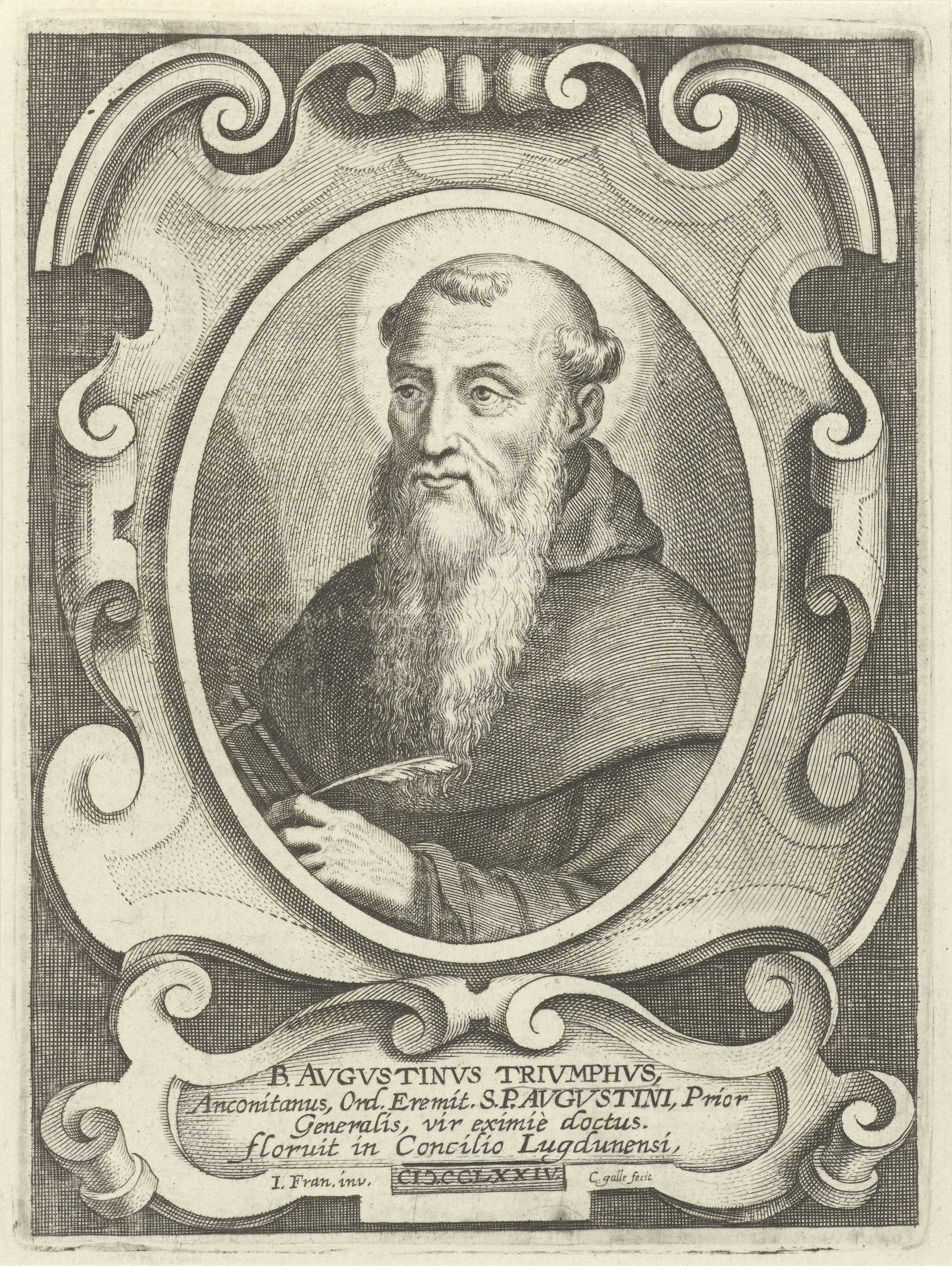
Augustinus Triumphus

Augustinus Triumphus OSA (Italian: Agostino Trionfo; 1243 – 2 April 1328), also known as Augustinus of Ancona, was a Hermit of St. Augustine and writer. He is celebrated for his work Summa de potestate ecclesiastica, printed in 1473. The Summa became a standard reference for papalist arguments in the later 16th century, and was several times reprinted.

Alongside James of Viterbo, Giles of Rome, and Alvarus Pelagius, Augustinus was among the leading pro-papal jurists. His title Triumphus is first attested in the 16th century.

== Works ==
- Summa de potestate ecclesiastica. Arnold ter Hoernen, Cologne 26.I.1475 digital
