= Hierocracy (medieval) =

Medieval theory of papal temporal supremacy

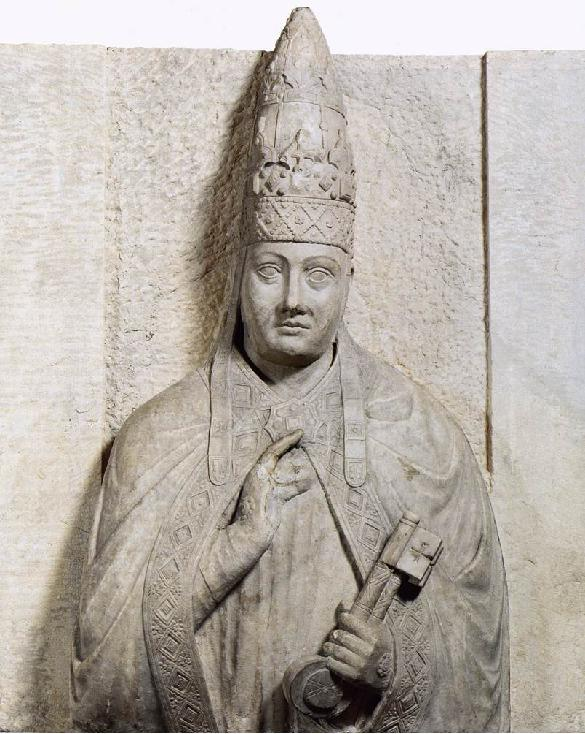
Tomb effigy of Boniface VIII

In the Middle Ages, hierocracy or papalism (Note: Hierocracy is sometimes construed as a more radical, specifically late medieval variant of papalism. Izbicki 1981, p. 108.) was a current of Latin legal and political thought that argued that the Pope held supreme authority over not just spiritual, but also temporal affairs. In its full, late medieval form, hierocratic theory posited that since Christ was lord of the universe and both king and priest, and the Pope was his earthly vicar, the Pope must also possess both spiritual and temporal authority over everybody in the world. Papalist writers at the turn of the 14th century such as Augustinus Triumphus and Giles of Rome depicted secular government as a product of human sinfulness that originated, by necessity, in tyrannical usurpation, and could be redeemed only by submission to the superior spiritual sovereignty of the Pope. At the head of the Catholic Church, responsible to no other jurisdiction except God, the pope, they argued, was the monarch of a universal kingdom whose power extended to Christians and non-Christians alike.

The hierocrats limited their extensive conception of the Pope's authority by acknowledging that the day-to-day exercise of temporal power belonged, in general, to secular princes, albeit under the guidance of the Pope. Hierocracy was criticised at the time from a pro-royal perspective by John of Paris, in defence of the universal monarchy of the Holy Roman Emperor by Dante Alighieri, and by critics of papal supremacy over the Catholic Church itself such as Marsilius of Padua. Though hierocracy continued to influence papal policy until the time of the Reformation, by the 17th century the doctrine was generally rejected by Catholic theologians.

== History ==
Medieval hierocratic theory originated with the Gregorian Reform of the mid-11th century. Since the pontificate of Gregory I at the start of the 7th century, successive popes had rarely felt the need to assert the principle of papal primacy explicitly. The growing frequency of papal intervention in church government incentivised medieval canonists to clarify the relationship between the Pope and the bishops, and by the 11th century this articulation of papal primacy had begun to extend to the Pope's authority in the secular sphere as well. In his 1075 Dictatus papae, Pope Gregory VII gave the principle a detailed legal form that sought to translate the abstract theory of primacy into concrete government policy. Once the Pope's internal monarchy within the church itself had been firmly established under Pope Innocent III at the beginning of the 13th century, the canonists could direct their attention further towards temporal affairs.

The mid-13th century elaboration by the canonist Hostiensis of the Pope's plenitudo potestatis, "plenitude of power", was an important milestone in the development of hierocratic theory. Hostiensis noted the traditional Christian argument that all political power derived from God, but argued that the Pope had a special status: as God's vicar, the Pope, when he exercised his office and did not sin, acted as God. The Pope's power was "miraculous"; he could issue dispensations at will from any positive law, rendering bastards legitimate, for example, and restoring the reputation of the infamous. Pope Innocent IV, who reigned from 1243 to 1254, gave papal policy an increasingly hierocratic direction by asserting that the pope had the right to elect a monarch himself if any Christian kingdom should fall vacant.

Hierocratic ideas developed further at the time of the struggle between Pope Boniface VIII and Philip IV of France, and received their ultimate official formulation in Boniface's 1302 bull Unam sanctam, which pronounced that the "spiritual power has to institute the earthly power and judge it" and that "it is entirely necessary for salvation that every human creature be subject to the Roman pontiff". Elaborate expositions of the hierocratic theory were composed at around the same time, such as Giles of Rome's De ecclesiastica potestate ("On Ecclesiastical Power") in 1301 and James of Viterbo's De regimine Christiano ("On Christian Government") in 1302. Boniface's eventual defeat dealt a blow to hierocratic aspirations from which they would not recover; nonetheless, hierocratic theory continued to influence the papacy well into the 16th century, as shown by the Fifth Lateran Council's republishing of Unam sanctam shortly before the Reformation and Pope Pius V's attempt to depose Elizabeth I of England in his 1570 bull Regnans in excelsis.

Despite their sweeping conception of the authority of the papal office, the hierocratic theorists did not believe that the Pope should, in the ordinary course of events, directly exercise temporal power himself. Though inferior to the Pope, they held that the office of the secular prince was nonetheless ordained by God, and the Pope's temporal authority was to be exercised indirectly through his guidance and direction of princes. The hierocratic canonist Augustinus Triumphus, in his 1326 Summa de potestate ecclesiastica ("Summary Account of Ecclesiastical Power"), argued that the Pope had universal jurisdiction in both temporal and spiritual matters across the whole world (in toto orbe terrarum spiritualium et temporalium ... universalis iurisdictio), but his immediate temporal administration extended only to the lands then believed to "have been granted" to him by the Donation of Constantine. Originally this was the Western Roman Empire, but when later monarchs arose and unjustly carved out territories for themselves, the Pope had chosen to suffer their claims to sovereignty to avoid schism among the faithful, and subsequently limited his administration in practice to Italy—without, however, renouncing any rights.

== Doctrinal Models ==
Hierocratic thought has been expressed through a few different doctrinal models describing the relationship between the clergy and the magistrate, most notably the Two Suns, Sun and Moon, and Two Swords theories.

=== Overview of the Models ===
==== Two Suns Theory ====
The Two Suns Theory argues that spiritual and secular authority are separate institutions, each receiving its authority directly from God. In Dante's formulation, Rome possessed "two suns", one guiding humanity towards the path of the world and the other towards the path of God. The clergy and the magistrate therefore have distinct roles: the clergy guides humanity towards eternal life, while the magistrate guides humanity towards progress in temporal affairs. This theory rejects the idea that secular authority depends upon spiritual authority.

==== Sun And Moon Theory ====
The Sun and Moon theory represents a medieval Christian view that the clergy holds a superior position over secular authority. Based on the imagery of Genesis 1:16, the pope is compared to as the "sun" and the emperor to the "moon". According to this model, the magistrate's authority is derived from and dependent upon the greater authority of the clergy, just as the moon's light depends upon the sun.

==== Two Swords Theory ====
Using the metaphor of two swords representing spiritual and temporal authority, Pope Boniface VIII argued that both swords were in the power of the church. The temporal sword, representing the magistrate's authority, was therefore subordinate to the spiritual sword, with secular authority subject to the judgment of the clergy.

=== Comparison Ranking by Degree of Clericalism ===
Based on the descriptions above, the doctrines can be ranked from least clericalist to most clericalist as follows:

==== Two Suns Theory (Least Clericalist) ====
The two suns theory is the least clerical because it presents the clergy and the magistrate as independent authorities, each receiving power directly from God. Dante's view is roughly that they are "separate, autonomous institutions" with the clergy responsible for eternal matters, and the magistrate responsible for progress in wordly affairs.

==== Sun and Moon Theory (Moderate Clericalism) ====
The sun and moon theory is more clerical because it places secular authority in a dependent relationship under spiritual authority. It is stated that under this model, the "lesser sphere" of the emperor is "wholly dependent" on the greater sphere of the Pope for its authority and influence.

==== Two Swords Theory (Most Clericalist) ====
The two swords theory is the most clerical as it explicitly places both spiritual and temporal authority within the power of the church. It is stated that Boniface VIII declared that "one sword ought to be under the other", and that temporal authority should be "subject to the spiritual power", making the magistrate subordinate to the clergy. Most clearly, Boniface states that "both are in the power of the Church", signifying a more extreme version of subordination.

== Critiques ==
Medieval opposition to hierocracy, insisting on a clear separation of temporal and spiritual power, is often termed "dualism": in practice hierocratic and dualist positions often overlapped, with hierocrats acknowledging the distinct authority of secular princes while dualists accepted the Pope's overall leadership of the Christian community.

Hierocracy was critiqued by other medieval writers on a number of fronts. Writing in the context of the dispute between Boniface and Philip of France, John of Paris argued in his 1303 De potestate regia et papali ("On Royal and Papal Power") that Christ's kingship was not of this world, and could not be interpreted as temporal jurisdiction. Moreover, while spiritual authority was united in the church and its steward the Pope, political authority was naturally plural. In his De Monarchia, composed roughly around 1310, Dante Alighieri adopted a different line of attack, defending the universal authority of the Holy Roman Emperor: it was against nature for the church to exercise temporal power, but also for political authority to be divided. Marsilius of Padua, in his 1324 Defensor pacis ("The Defender of the Peace"), rejected the entire basis of the papacy as a divinely sanctioned office, arguing that it was a political office like any other and that the Pope's illegitimate claims to universal authority were a cause of civil discord.

Hierocratic arguments were discredited in later Catholic theology. Cardinal Robert Bellarmine attacked the hierocratic conception in his 1610 work De potestate Summi Pontifici ("On the Power of the Supreme Pontiff") on the basis that the Pope's duties descended from Christ as a mortal man, not as God, and the Jesuit theologian Francisco Suárez argued around the same time that the Pope could not infringe, even in extraordinary cases, on the supremacy of secular sovereigns in worldly affairs. Hierocracy had very few notable supporters by the early 17th century, and these critiques were concerned less with refuting it as a live position than with reassuring secular rulers that Catholicism would not undermine their authority.

== See also ==
- Ultramontanism
- Decretalist
- Guelphs and Ghibellines
- Sun and Moon allegory
- Alvarus Pelagius
- Doctrine of the two swords
- Papal deposing power
