= William Marshall (translator) =

16th century English Protestant reformer, printer and translator

William Marshall (died 1540?) was an English Protestant reformer, printer, and translator.

== Early life ==
Marshall apparently acted as clerk to Sir Richard Broke, the chief baron of the exchequer, and was acquainted with Sir Thomas More. He advocated for Henry VIII's divorce from Catherine of Aragon, and in 1535 was one of Thomas Cromwell's confidential agents.

== Translations and other works ==
Through Thomas Cromwell's favour, Marshall obtained a license for printing books, and his main occupation from about 1534 seems to have been in preparing works for his press. At the period when he first began literary work, he was living in Wood Street, London. He was then translating Lorenzo Valla's undermining of the Donation of Constantine, and a work by Erasmus that appeared under the titles Maner and Forme of Confession or Erasmus of Confession.

Borrowing from Cromwell, Marshall published The Defence of Peace, on 27 July 1535. It was a translation of Marsilio of Padua's Defensor pacis, the 14th century work against the temporal power of the Pope. It was printed by Robert Wyer. In the same year appeared his Pyctures and Ymages, printed by John Gough, an English translation via Latin of Martin Bucer's Das einigerlei Bild. Lord Chancellor Thomas Audeley and Thomas Broke thought it too provocative. Cromwell, however, let it go ahead, with a noticeable reaction to its suggestions on burning images.

Marshall built up a reformist portfolio, with a translation by William Turner from Joachim Vadian, an English primer that presaged the Bishops' Book and Thomas Cranmer's Litany, and a Flemish work on poor relief. The Defensor pacis, however, did not sell well. In 1536, Marshall encountered money troubles, and a family problem as John Gostwick pursued a loan of his brother Thomas, parson at South Molton. Cromwell was unwilling to help as Gostwick was one of his closest friends, or give Marshall preferments stripped from Reginald Pole.

In 1542 there appeared Marshall's An Abridgement of Sebastian Munster's Chronicle, printed by Wyer. Joseph Ames also attributed to Marshall the Chrysten Bysshop and Counterfayte Bysshop, n.d., printed by Gough. The date of his death is unknown, but may be around 1540.

== Family ==
Marshall was married and had two sons, Richard, who has been tentatively identified with Richard Marshall the dean of Christ Church, and another named Thomas. Nothing is known of his marriage or of any other children.

== Notes ==
Attribution

This article incorporates text from a publication now in the public domain: Lee, Sidney, ed. (1893). "Marshall, William (fl.1535)". Dictionary of National Biography. Vol. 36. London: Smith, Elder & Co.
