= A Dispute Between a Priest and a Knight =

Dialogue written between 1296 and 1303

Disputatio inter clericum et militem (A Dispute Between a Priest and a Knight) is a dialogue, written in France between 1296 and 1303. Although anonymous, it could have been written by John of Paris, master of the University of Paris. The treatise examines the relationship between Church and King through a fictional dialogue between a Priest and a Knight.

It was written during the period of the acrimonious dispute between King Philip IV and Pope Boniface VIII, which culminated in the Papal bull Unam sanctam of 1302. It is essentially propaganda. The furious reaction of Philip and his ministry expressed in the Disputatio (written in simple language for a popular audience) can be understood within the context of a conflict between the increasing power of secular rulers in France and England, who were attempting to tax the clergy to support warfare. Boniface's stringent reaction was the fierce bull Clericis laicos of 1296, which set off the dispute. The dialogue can be fitted into the context of the debate over the extent of church powers that was raging in the time delimited by the two bulls.

However, the work remained unknown in its own time and was not published until 1378. A translation by John Trevisa (1342-1402) was popular in England because of its antipapalism, and it continued to be popular in the 16th century for similar reasons.

In the story the knight and priest exchange rapid fire and simple dialogue designed to reach a broad audience. The knight's intention is to prove that soft-living wealthy clerics, who have more money than needed, should hand the extra income over to secular leaders, whose job it is to deal in more earthly affairs. Specifically it is the job of secular leaders to protect the Church from outside threats, and the Church must pay the nobles for their own protection. Within the realm of the kingdom, kings have ultimate authority over all matters and the Church must obey the right of the king to tax the Church for the purpose of protection. If it refuses, the king may seize Church property.

Disputatio was a sharp criticism of the church and foreshadowed further 14th century arguments that pitted royalist national sovereignty against the principles of papal supremacy.

John of Paris also wrote a related work entitled "On Royal and Papal Power" about the autonomous nature of kingdoms, an early expression of the concept of sovereignty.

== See also ==
- Tractatus Eboracenses
