= Investiture Controversy =

Medieval dispute between secular rulers and the papacy (1076–1122)

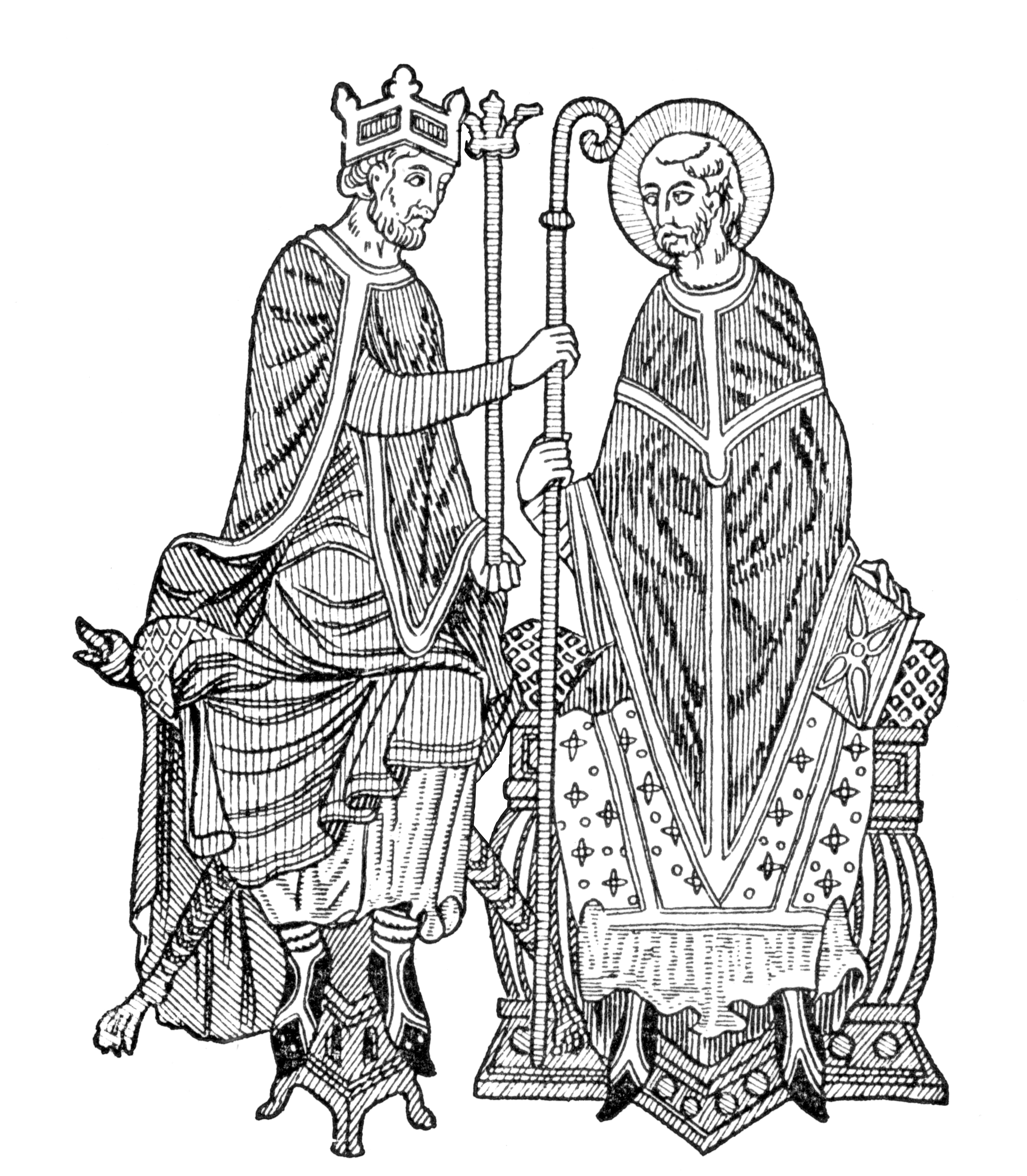
Woodcut of a medieval king investing a bishop with the symbols of office, Philip Van Ness Myers, 1905

The Investiture Controversy or Investiture Contest (Latin: Controversia de Investitura, German: Investiturstreit, pronounced [ɪnvɛstiˈtuːɐ̯ˌʃtʁaɪt]) was a conflict between the Church and the state in medieval Europe over the ability to choose and install bishops (investiture), abbots of monasteries, and the Pope himself. A series of popes in the 11th and 12th centuries undercut the power of the Holy Roman Emperor and other European monarchies, and the controversy led to nearly 50 years of conflict.

It began as a power struggle between Pope Gregory VII and Henry IV (then King, later Holy Roman Emperor) in 1076. The conflict ended in 1122, when Pope Callixtus II and Emperor Henry V agreed on the Concordat of Worms. The agreement required bishops to swear an oath of fealty to the secular monarch, who held authority "by the lance" but left selection to the church. It affirmed the right of the church to invest bishops with sacred authority, symbolized by a ring and staff. In Germany (but not Italy and Burgundy), the Emperor also retained the right to preside over elections of abbots and bishops by church authorities, and to arbitrate disputes. Holy Roman Emperors renounced the right to choose the Pope.

In the meantime, there was also a brief but significant investiture struggle between Pope Paschal II and King Henry I of England from 1103 to 1107. The earlier resolution to that conflict, the Concordat of London, was very similar to the Concordat of Worms.

== Background ==
=== Practical problems ===
After the decline of the Western Roman Empire, investiture was performed by members of the ruling nobility (and was known as lay investiture) despite theoretically being a task of the church. Many bishops and abbots were themselves part of the ruling nobility. Given that most members of the European nobility practiced primogeniture, and willed their titles of nobility to the eldest surviving male heir, surplus male siblings often sought careers in the upper levels of the church hierarchy. This was particularly true where the family may have established a proprietary church or abbey on their estate. Since a substantial amount of wealth and land was usually associated with the office of a bishop or abbot, the sale of church offices—a practice known as simony—was an important source of income for leaders among the nobility, who themselves owned the land and by charity allowed the building of churches. Emperors had been heavily relying on bishops for their secular administration, as they were not hereditary or quasi-hereditary nobility with family interests. The imperial rulers justified their power by the theory of the divine right of kings.

=== Political antagonisms and the transformation of authority ===
Apart from the desire to improve the literacy and piety of personnel appointed to the administration of parishes and estates, the investiture controversy was sparked when the (German) Holy Roman Emperor Henry III appointed and dismissed three popes in quick succession within a few years during the mid-11th century.

Pope Gregory VII's policy of resistance to this kind of administrative disruption—best expressed in his excommunication of Emperor Henry IV, temporarily disabling his military regime—elides the geopolitical stakes involved in the controversy: The German episcopate composed the effective cabinet of counselors to the Emperor, and the soldiers which these dioceses provided to the lists were the main source of the Empire's military might.

The Carolingian emperors (succeeded by the Ottonians and Salians) rose to power partly by aligning themselves with the Western papacy, who partnered in the usurpation (and/or reinstatement) of certain authorities and rights that had previously belonged to absentee institutions and figures in the Byzantine Empire by the Western church in Rome and by the western Emperor when this role was (re)created when Charlemagne was anointed as ruler. But by the eleventh century, when the investiture controversy broke out, the German bishoprics had much greater power than the Pope in Rome in practice. The shift in Papal policy during the investiture controversy represents an assertion (or recovery) of centralized power in Rome within the Western church.

=== Trajectory and cycle ===
Many of the papal selections before 1059 were influenced politically and militarily by European powers, often with a king or emperor announcing a choice which would be rubber-stamped by church electors. The Holy Roman Emperors of the Ottonian dynasty believed they should have the power to appoint the pope. Since the ascendance of the first of that line, Otto the Great (936–972), the bishops had been princes of the empire, had secured many privileges, and had become to a great extent feudal lords over great districts of the imperial territory. The control of these great units of economic and military power was for the king a question of primary importance due to its effect on imperial authority. It was essential for a ruler or nobleman to appoint (or sell the office to) someone who would remain loyal.

Simony became particularly unpopular as Pope Benedict IX was accused of selling the papacy in 1045. From 1046 to 1056, Henry III settled the papal schism, and named several popes, the last emperor to successfully dominate the selection process. Six-year-old Henry IV became King of the Germans in 1056.

== Pope Nicholas II ==
Benedict X was elected under the influence of the Count of Tusculum, allegedly by bribing the electors. Dissenting cardinals elected Pope Nicholas II in 1058 at Siena. Nicholas II successfully waged war against Benedict X and regained control of the Vatican. Nicholas II convened a synod in the Lateran on Easter in 1059. The results were codified in the papal bull In nomine Domini. It declared that leaders of the nobility would have no part in the selection of popes (though the Holy Roman Emperor might confirm the choice) and that electors would be cardinals (which would later evolve into the College of Cardinals) assembled in Rome. The bull also banned lay investiture. In response, all the bishops in Germany (who supported the Emperor) assembled in 1061 and declared all the decrees of Nicholas II null and void. Nevertheless, the elections of Pope Alexander II and Pope Gregory VII proceeded according to church rules, without the involvement of the Emperor.

== Henry IV and Pope Gregory VII ==
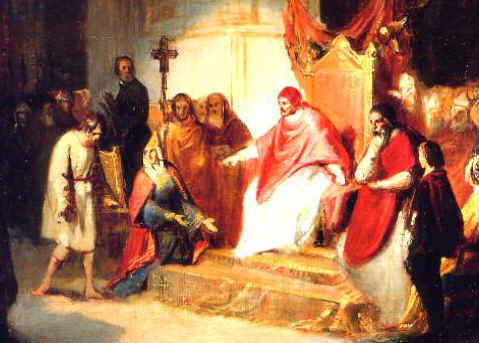
Henry IV begging forgiveness of Pope Gregory VII at Canossa, the castle of the Countess Matilda, 1077

Both Emperor Henry IV and Pope Gregory VII claimed supreme power. In 1075, Gregory VII composed the Dictatus papae, though this was not published at the time, cataloging principles of his Gregorian Reforms. One clause asserted that the pope held the exclusive power to depose an emperor. It declared that the Roman church was founded by God alone—that the papal power (the auctoritas of Pope Gelasius) was the sole universal power; in particular, a council held in the Lateran Palace from 24 to 28 February the same year decreed that the pope alone could appoint or depose churchmen or move them from see to see. The pope objected to bishops being 'invested' with the symbols of their office by their lay lord to show their fealty. By this time, Henry IV was no longer a child, and he continued to appoint his own bishops, angering Gregory. He reacted to this declaration by sending Gregory VII a letter in which he withdrew his imperial support of Gregory as pope in no uncertain terms: the letter was headed "Henry, king not through usurpation but through the holy ordination of God, to Hildebrand, at present not pope but false monk". It called for the election of a new pope. His letter ends, "I, Henry, king by the grace of God, with all of my Bishops, say to you, come down, come down!", and is often quoted with "and to be damned throughout the ages", which is a later addition.

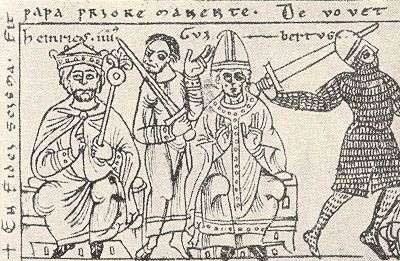
Contemporary illustration of Henry IV (left) and Antipope Clement III (centre)

The situation was made even more dire when Henry IV installed his chaplain, Tedald, a Milanese priest, as Bishop of Milan, when another priest of Milan, Atto, had already been chosen in Rome by the pope. In 1076 Gregory responded by excommunicating Henry, and deposed him as German king, releasing all Christians from their oaths of allegiance and causing many of Henry's subjects to refuse to obey him. Henry decided to beg Gregory's pardon, which was granted.

Enforcing these declarations was a different matter, but the advantage gradually came to be on the side of Gregory VII. German princes and the aristocracy were happy to hear of the king's deposition. They used religious reasons to continue the rebellion started at the First Battle of Langensalza in 1075, and to seize royal holdings. Aristocrats claimed local lordships over peasants and property, built forts, which had previously been outlawed, and built up localized fiefdoms to secure their autonomy from the empire.

Henry IV requests mediation from Matilda of Tuscany and abbot Hugh of Cluny.

This combination of factors forced Henry IV to back down, as he needed time to marshal his forces to fight the rebellion. In 1077, he traveled to Canossa in northern Italy, where the Pope was staying in the castle of Countess Matilda, to apologize in person. The pope was suspicious of Henry's motives, and did not believe he was truly repentant. As penance for his sins, and echoing his own punishment of the Saxons after the First Battle of Langensalza, he wore a hair shirt and stood barefoot in the snow in what has become known as the Road to Canossa. Gregory lifted the excommunication, but the German aristocrats, whose rebellion became known as the Great Saxon Revolt, were not as willing to give up their opportunity and elected a rival king, Rudolf von Rheinfeld. Three years later, Pope Gregory declared his support for von Rheinfeld and then on the Lenten synod of 7 March 1080 excommunicated Henry IV again. In turn, Henry called a council of bishops at Brixen that proclaimed Gregory illegitimate. The internal revolt against Henry effectively ended that same year, however, when Rudolf von Rheinfeld died.

Henry IV named Guibert of Ravenna (whom he had invested as bishop of Ravenna) to be pope, referring to Clement III (known by the Catholic Church as Antipope Clement III) as "our pope". In October 1080, troops raised by the pro-Imperial bishops of Northern Italy clashed with the pro-papal forces of Countess Matilda in the Battle of Volta Mantovana. The pro-Imperial forces were victorious, and in March 1081 Henry IV marched from the Brenner Pass into the March of Verona unopposed, entering Milan in April that year. He then attacked Rome and besieged the city with the intent of forcibly removing Gregory VII and installing Clement III. The city of Rome withstood the siege, but the Vatican and St. Peter's fell in 1083. On the outskirts of the city, Henry gained thirteen cardinals who became loyal to his cause. The next year the city of Rome surrendered and Henry triumphantly entered the city. On Palm Sunday, 1084, Henry IV solemnly enthroned Clement at St. Peter's Basilica; on Easter Day, Clement returned the favour and crowned Henry IV as Emperor of the Holy Roman Empire.

Gregory VII was meanwhile still resisting a few hundred yards away from the basilica in the Castel Sant'Angelo, then known as the house of Cencius. Gregory called on his allies for help, and Robert Guiscard (the Norman ruler of Sicily, Apulia, and Calabria) responded, entering Rome on 27 May 1084. The Normans came in force and attacked with such strength that Henry and his army fled. Gregory VII was rescued, but Rome was plundered in the process, for which the citizens of Rome blamed him. As a result, Gregory VII was forced to leave Rome under the protection of the Normans, fleeing to Salerno, where he grew ill and died on 25 May 1085. The last words he uttered were, "I have loved justice and hated iniquity, and therefore I die in exile."

Upon the death of Gregory, the cardinals elected a new pope, Pope Victor III. He owed his elevation to the influence of the Normans. Antipope Clement III still occupied St. Peter's Basilica. When Victor III died, the cardinals elected Pope Urban II (1088–1099). He was one of three men Gregory VII suggested as his successor. Urban II preached the First Crusade, which united Western Europe, and more importantly, reconciled the majority of bishops who had abandoned Gregory VII.

The reign of Henry IV showed the weakness of the German monarchy. The ruler was dependent upon the good will of the nobility of his land. These were technically royal officials and hereditary princes. He was also dependent on the resources of the churches. Henry IV alienated the Church of Rome and many of the magnates in his own kingdom. Many of these spent years in open or subversive rebellion. Henry failed to create a proper bureaucracy to replace his disobedient vassals. The magnates became increasingly independent, and the Church withdrew support. Henry IV spent the last years of his life desperately grasping to keep his throne. It was a greatly diminished kingdom.

== Henry V, Holy Roman Emperor ==
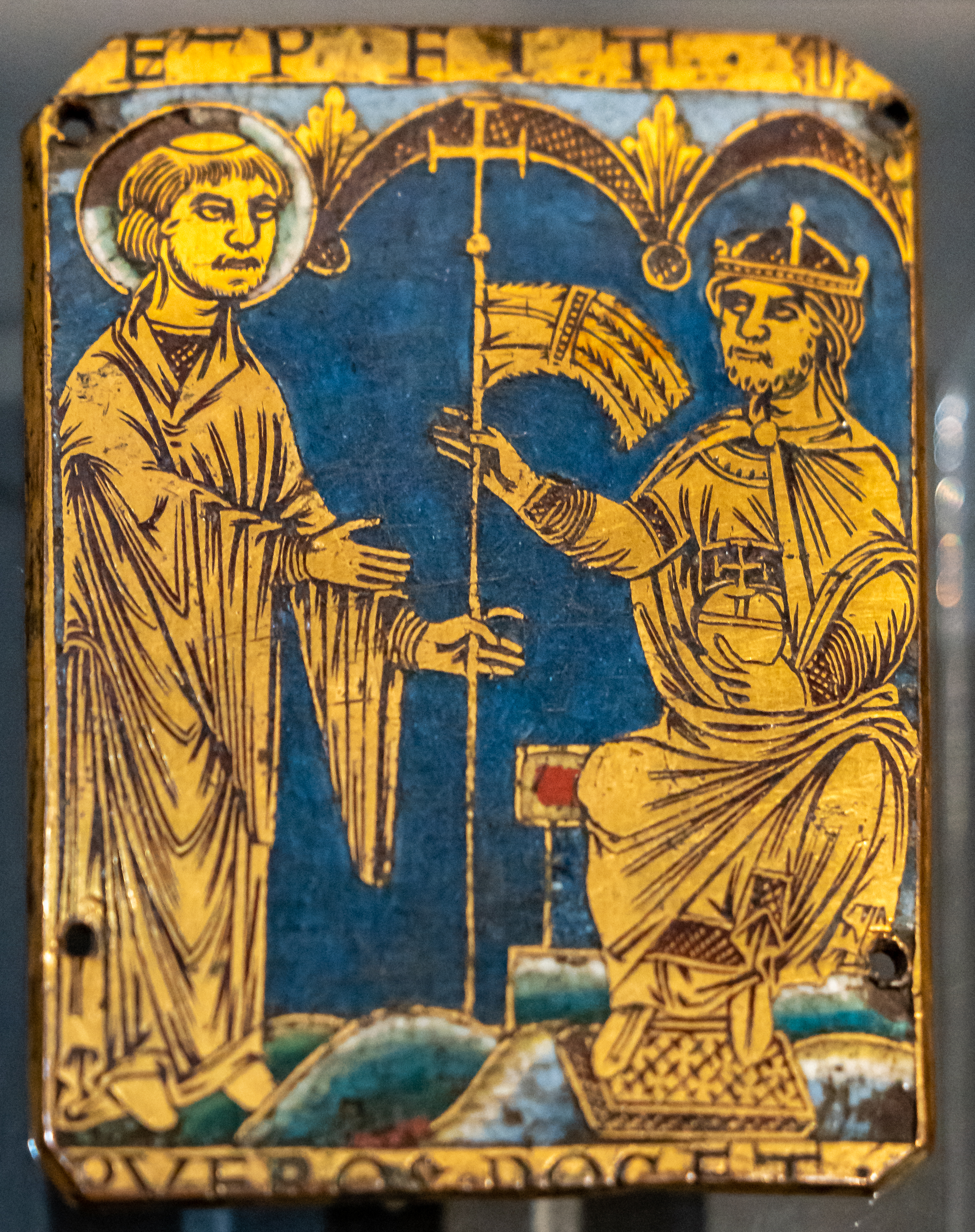
Enamel panel from Cologne figuring the investiture of a bishop (c. 1160–1170), Museum für Kunst und Gewerbe Hamburg, Germany

The Investiture Controversy continued for several decades as each successive pope tried to diminish imperial power by stirring up revolt in Germany. These revolts were gradually successful. The reign of Henry IV ended with a diminished kingdom and waning power. Many of his underlords had been in constant or desultory revolt for years. Henry IV's insistence that Antipope Clement III was the real pope had initially been popular with some of the nobles, and even many of the bishops of Germany. But as years passed, this support was slowly withdrawn. The idea that the German king could and should name the pope was increasingly discredited and viewed as an anachronism from a by-gone era. On 31 December 1105, Henry IV was forced to abdicate and was succeeded by his son Henry V, who had rebelled against his father in favor of the papacy, and made his father renounce the legality of his antipopes before he died.

Henry V realised swift action and a change in his father's policy was necessary. Pope Paschal II rebuked Henry V for appointing bishops in Germany. The king crossed the Alps with an army in 1111. The pope, who was weak and had few supporters, was forced to suggest a compromise, the abortive Concordat of 1111. Its simple and radical solution of the investiture controversy between the prerogatives of regnum and sacerdotium proposed that German churchmen would surrender their lands and secular offices to the emperor and constitute a purely spiritual church. Henry gained greater control over the lands of his kingdom, especially those that had been in the hands of the church, but of contested title. He would not interfere with ecclesiastical affairs and churchmen would avoid secular services. The church would be given autonomy and to Henry V would be restored large parts of his empire that his father had lost. And finally, Henry V would be crowned as the Holy Roman Emperor by Paschal II. When the concessions of land were read in St. Peter's, however, the crowd erupted in anger. Henry took the pope and cardinals hostage until the pope granted Henry V the right of investiture. Then he returned to Germany—crowned emperor and apparent victor over the papacy.

Henry's victory was, however, as short-lived as that of his father, Henry IV over Gregory VII. The clergy urged Paschal to rescind his agreement, which he did in 1112. The quarrel followed the predictable course: Henry V rebelled and was excommunicated. Riots broke out in Germany; a new antipope, Gregory VIII, was appointed by the German king; and nobles loyal to Rome seceded from Henry. The unrest and conflict in Germany continued, just as under Henry IV. And the controversy with respect to investiture dragged on for another ten years. Like his father before him, Henry V was faced with waning power. Ultimately, he had no choice but to give up investiture and the old right of naming the pope. The Concordat of Worms in 1122 was the result. After the Concordat, the German kings never had the same control over the Church as had existed in the time of the Ottonian dynasty. Henry V was received back into communion and recognized as legitimate emperor as a result.

Henry V died without heirs in 1125, three years after the Concordat. He had designated his nephew, Frederick von Staufen duke of Swabia, also known as Frederick II, Duke of Swabia as his successor. Instead, churchmen elected Lothair III. A long civil war erupted between the Staufen, also known as Hohenstaufen, and the heirs of Lothar III, paving the way for the rise to power of the Hohenstaufen Frederick I (1152–1190).

== English investiture controversy (1102–1107) ==
At the time of Henry IV's death, Henry I of England and the Gregorian papacy were also embroiled in a controversy over investiture, and its solution provided a model for the eventual solution of the issue in the empire.

William the Conqueror had accepted a papal banner and the distant blessing of Pope Alexander II upon his invasion, but had successfully rebuffed the pope's assertion after the successful outcome, that he should come to Rome and pay homage for his fief, under the general provisions of the Donation of Constantine.

The ban on lay investiture in Dictatus papae did not shake the loyalty of William's bishops and abbots. In the reign of Henry I, the heat of exchanges between Westminster and Rome induced Anselm, Archbishop of Canterbury, to give up mediating and retire to an abbey. Robert of Meulan, one of Henry's chief advisors, was excommunicated, but the threat of excommunicating the king remained unplayed. The papacy needed the support of English Henry while German Henry was still unbroken. A projected crusade also required English support.

Henry I commissioned the Archbishop of York to collect and present all the relevant traditions of anointed kingship. On this topic, the historian Norman Cantor would note: "The resulting 'Anonymous of York' treatises are a delight to students of early-medieval political theory, but they in no way typify the outlook of the Anglo-Norman monarchy, which had substituted the secure foundation of administrative and legal bureaucracy for outmoded religious ideology."

== Concordat of London (1107) ==
The Concordat of London, agreed in 1107, was a forerunner of a compromise that was later taken up in the Concordat of Worms. In England, as in Germany, the king's chancery started to distinguish between the secular and ecclesiastical powers of the prelates. Bowing to political reality and employing this distinction, Henry I of England gave up his right to invest his bishops and abbots while reserving the custom of requiring them to swear homage for the "temporalities" (the landed properties tied to the episcopate) directly from his hand, after the bishop had sworn homage and feudal vassalage in the commendation ceremony (commendatio), like any secular vassal. The system of vassalage was not divided among great local lords in England as it was in France, since the king was in control by right of the conquest.

=== Later developments in England ===
Henry I of England perceived a danger in placing monastic scholars in his chancery and turned increasingly to secular clerks, some of whom held minor positions in the Church. He often rewarded these men with the titles of bishop and abbot. Henry I expanded the system of scutage to reduce the monarchy's dependence on knights supplied from church lands. Unlike the situation in Germany, Henry I of England used the Investiture Controversy to strengthen the secular power of the king. It would continue to boil under the surface. The controversy would surface in the Thomas Becket affair under Henry II of England, the Great Charter of 1217, the Statutes of Mortmain and the battles over Cestui que use under Henry VII of England, and finally come to a head under Henry VIII of England.

== Concordat of Worms (1122) ==
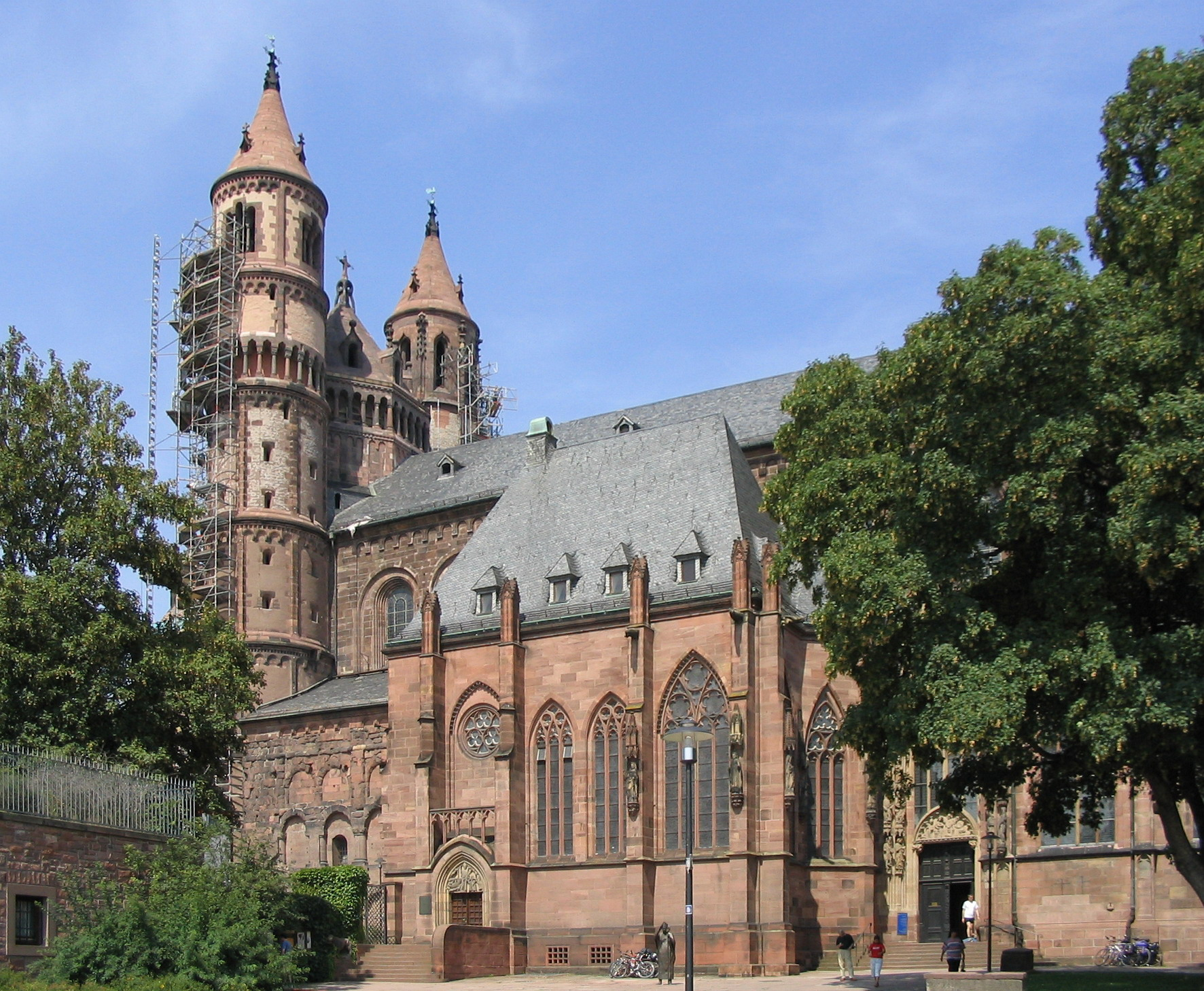
The Cathedral of Worms was 10 years old when the Concordat was issued there in 1122.

The European mainland experienced about 50 years of fighting, with efforts by Lamberto Scannabecchi, the future Pope Honorius II, and the 1121 Diet of Würzburg to end the conflict. On 23 September 1122, near the German city of Worms, Pope Callixtus II and Holy Roman Emperor Henry V entered into an agreement, now known as the Concordat of Worms, that ended the Investiture Controversy. It eliminated lay investiture, while allowing secular leaders some room for unofficial but significant influence in the appointment process.

By the terms of the agreement, the election of bishops and abbots in Germany was to take place in the emperor's presence (or his legate's) as a judge ("without violence") between potentially disputing parties, free of bribes, thus retaining to the emperor a crucial role in choosing these great territorial magnates of the Empire. But absent a dispute, the canons of the cathedral were to elect the bishop, monks were to choose the abbot. Beyond the borders of Germany, in Burgundy and Italy, the election would be handled by the church without imperial interference.

Callixtus' reference to the feudal homage due the emperor on appointment is guarded: "shall do unto thee for these what he rightfully should" was the wording of the privilegium granted by Callixtus. The emperor's right to a substantial imbursement (payment) on the election of a bishop or abbot was specifically denied.

The emperor renounced the right to invest ecclesiastics with ring and crosier, the symbols of their spiritual power, and guaranteed election by the canons of cathedral or abbey and free consecration. To make up for this and symbolise the worldly authority of the bishop which the pope had always recognised to derive from the Emperor, another symbol, the scepter, was invented, which would be handed over by the king (or his legate).

The two ended by promising mutual aid when requested and by granting one another peace. The Concordat was confirmed by the First Council of the Lateran in 1123.

=== Terminology ===
In modern terminology, a concordat is an international convention, specifically one concluded between the Holy See and the civil power of a country to define the relationship between the Catholic Church and the state in matters in which both are concerned. Concordats began during the First Crusade's end in 1098.

The Concordat of Worms (Latin: Concordatum Wormatiense) is sometimes called the Pactum Callixtinum by papal historians, since the term "concordat" was not in use until Nicolas of Cusa's De concordantia catholica of 1434. (Note: In his article "The Pactum Callixtinum: An Innovation in Papal Diplomacy", P. W. Browne observes that the term concordat was not in use until Nicolas of Cusa's De concordantia catholica of 1434.)

== Legacy ==
=== Local authority ===
In the long term, the decline of imperial power would divide Germany until the 19th century. Similarly, in Italy, the investiture controversy weakened the emperor's authority and strengthened local separatists.

While the monarchy was embroiled in the dispute with the Church, its power declined, and the localized rights of lordship over peasants increased, which eventually led to:

- Increased serfdom that reduced rights for the majority
- Local taxes and levies increased, while royal coffers declined
- Localized rights of justice where courts did not have to answer to royal authority

=== Selection of leaders ===
The papacy grew stronger, and the laity became engaged in religious affairs, increasing its piety and setting the stage for the Crusades and the great religious vitality of the 12th century.

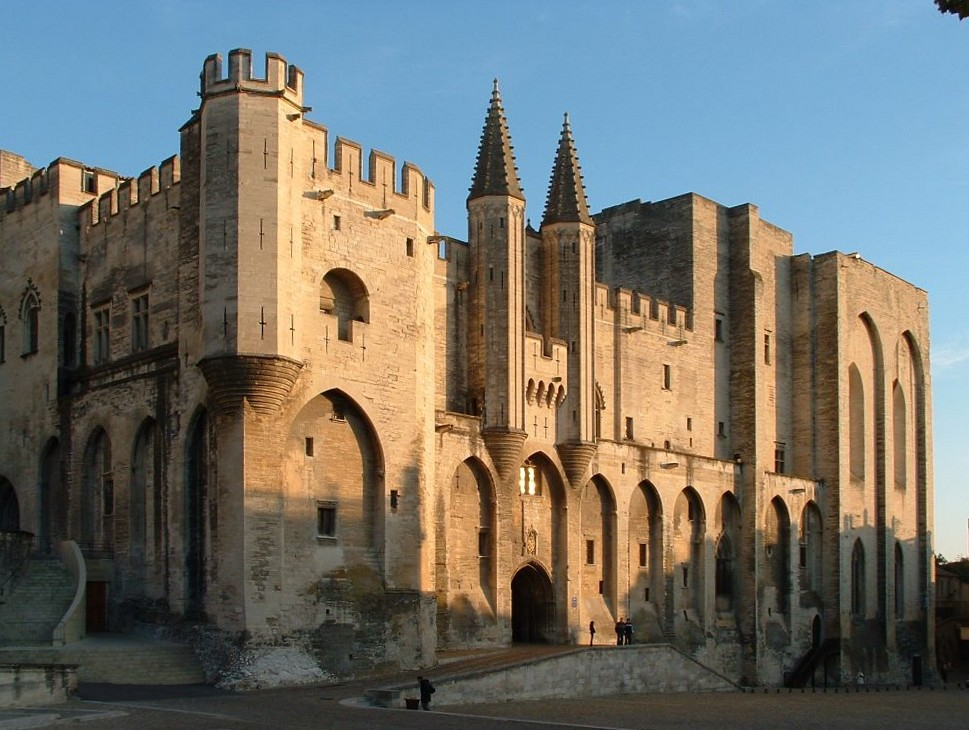
The Avignon Papacy occurred several centuries after the Concordat, and indicated that there was continued interference in the papacy by kings.

German kings still had de facto influence over the selection of German bishops, though over time, German princes gained influence among church electors. The bishop-elect would then be invested by the Emperor (or representative) with the scepter and, sometime afterwards, by his ecclesial superior with ring and staff. The resolution of the Controversy produced a significant improvement in the character of men raised to the episcopacy. Kings no longer interfered so frequently in their election, and when they did, they generally nominated more worthy candidates for the office.

The Concordat of Worms did not end the interference of European monarchs in the selection of the pope. Practically speaking, the German kings retained a decisive voice in the selection of the hierarchy. All kings supported King John of England's defiance of Pope Innocent III ninety years after the Concordat of Worms in the matter concerning Stephen Langton. In theory, the pope named his bishops and cardinals. In reality, more often than not, Rome consecrated the clergy once it was notified by the kings who the incumbent would be. Recalcitrance by Rome would lead to problems in the kingdom. For the most part it was a no-win situation for Rome. In this, the Concordat of Worms changed little. The growth of canon law in the Ecclesiastical Courts was based on the underlying Roman law and increased the strength of the Roman Pontiff.

Disputes between popes and Holy Roman Emperors continued until northern Italy was lost to the empire entirely, after the wars of the Guelphs and Ghibellines. Emperor Otto IV marched on Rome and commanded Pope Innocent III to annul the Concordat of Worms and to recognise the imperial crown's right to make nominations to all vacant benefices. The church would crusade against the Holy Roman Empire under Frederick II. As historian Norman Cantor put it, the controversy "shattered the early-medieval equilibrium and ended the interpenetration of ecclesia and mundus". Indeed, medieval emperors, which were "largely the creation of ecclesiastical ideals and personnel", were forced to develop a secular bureaucratic state, whose essential components persisted in the Anglo-Norman monarchy.

Kings continued to attempt to control either the direct leadership of the church, or indirectly through political means for centuries. This is seen most clearly in the Avignon Papacy when the popes moved from Rome to Avignon. The conflict in Germany and northern Italy arguably left the culture ripe for various Protestant sects, such as the Cathars, the Waldensians and ultimately Jan Hus and Martin Luther.

=== Authority and reform ===
Though the Holy Roman Emperor retained some power over imperial churches, his power was damaged irreparably because he lost the religious authority that previously belonged to the office of the king. In France, England, and the Christian state in Spain, the king could overcome rebellions of his magnates and establish the power of his royal demesne because he could rely on the Church, which, for several centuries, had given him a mystical authority. From time to time, rebellious and recalcitrant monarchs might run afoul of the Church. These could be excommunicated, and after an appropriate time and public penance, be received back into the communion and good graces of the Church.

Of the three reforms Gregory VII and his predecessors and successor popes had attempted, the most successful had been that in regard to celibacy of the clergy. Simony had been partially checked. Against lay investiture they won only a limited success, and one that seemed less impressive as the years passed. During the time following the Concordat of Worms, the Church gained in both stature and power.

The wording of the Concordat of Worms was ambiguous, skirted some issues and avoided others altogether. This has caused some scholars to conclude that the settlement turned its back on Gregory VII's and Urban II's genuine hopes for reform. The emperor's influence in episcopal matters was preserved, and he could decide disputed elections. If the compromise was a rebuke to the most radical vision of the liberty of the Church, on at least one point its implication was firm and unmistakable: the king, even an emperor, was a layman, and his power at least morally limited (hence, totalitarianism was unacceptable). According to the opinion of W. Jordan, the divine right of kings was dealt a blow from which it never completely recovered, yet unfettered authority and Caesaropapism was not something the later Mediaevals and Early Moderns understood by the phrase "by the grace of God" (which many of them ardently defended). If anything, a blow was dealt to subconsciously remaining pre-Christian Germanic feelings of "royal hail".

=== Unifications of Germany and Italy ===
It was the consequence of this lengthy episode that a whole generation grew up in Germany and Northern Italy in an atmosphere of war, doubt and scepticism. The papal backers had been busy propounding arguments to show that royal power was not of divine origin. They had been so successful that the moral authority of the Emperor had been undermined in the minds of many of his subjects. Serious divisions existed from this battle over the Investiture Controversy, which fractured large portions of the Holy Roman Empire in Germany and Italy. Davis argues these rifts were so deep and lasting that neither Germany nor Italy were able to form a cohesive nation-state until the 19th century. A similar situation arose from the French Revolution, which caused fractures in France that still exist. The effect of Henry IV's excommunication, and his subsequent refusal to repent left a turbulence in central Europe that lasted throughout the Middle Ages. It may have been emblematic of certain German attitudes toward religion in general, and the perceived relevance of the German Emperor in the universal scheme of things.

=== German culture ===
The catastrophic political consequences of the struggle between pope and emperor also led to a cultural disaster. Germany lost intellectual leadership in western Europe. In 1050, German monasteries were great centres of learning and art and German schools of theology and canon law were unsurpassed and probably unmatched anywhere in Europe. The long war over investiture sapped the energy of both German churchmen and intellectuals. They fell behind advances in philosophy, law, literature and art taking place in France and Italy. In many ways, Germany never caught up during the rest of the Middle Ages. Universities were established in France, Italy, Spain and England by the early 13th century. Notable are the University of Bologna, 1088, Oxford University, 1096, the University of Salamanca, 1134, the University of Paris, 1150, and the University of Cambridge, 1207. The first German university, the Heidelberg University, was not established until 1386. It was immediately steeped in medieval nominalism and early Protestantism.

=== Development of liberty and prosperity in northern Europe ===
The political scientist Bruce Bueno de Mesquita argues that the Concordat of Worms contained within itself the germ of nation-based sovereignty that would one day be confirmed in the Peace of Westphalia (1648). The Concordat of Worms created an incentive structure for the rulers of the Catholic parts of Europe such that in the northern regions, local rulers were motivated to raise the prosperity and liberty of their subjects because such reforms helped those rulers assert their independence from the pope.

With the Concordat of Worms, the pope became the de facto selector of bishops, as his recommendations all but guaranteed a candidate's nomination. Instead of myriad local customs, it all came down to negotiations between the pope and the local secular ruler. Therefore, the influence of the pope in the region became the common deciding factor across the Catholic parts of Europe.

As a consequence of the Concordat, if the local ruler rejected the pope's nominee for bishop, the ruler could keep the revenue of the diocese for himself, but the pope could retaliate in various ways, such as: ordering the local priests to not perform certain sacraments such as marriages, which would annoy the ruler's subjects; forgiving oaths made by the vassals to the ruler; and even excommunicating the ruler, thereby undermining his moral legitimacy. Eventually, the ruler would have to give in to the pope and accept a bishop. The longer a local ruler could hold out against the pope, the more leverage the ruler had to demand a bishop who suited his interests.

In a region where the pope's influence was weak, the local priests might have performed sacraments anyway, having calculated that defying the pope was not as dangerous as angering their parishioners; the ruler's vassals might have honored their oaths anyway because the pope could not protect them from their lord's wrath; and the subjects might still have respected their ruler despite excommunication.

If the pope's influence in a diocese was weak, the local ruler could force the pope to choose between getting the tax revenue and appointing a loyal bishop. If said diocese was relatively poor, the pope would stubbornly hold out until the local ruler accepted the pope's choice of bishop. During this standoff, the pope would not get any money from the diocese, but this was fine with him because the diocese didn't yield much money anyway. But if said diocese was prosperous, the pope wanted to resolve the dispute more quickly so that he could sooner get that ample revenue flowing into his coffers, and so he was more inclined to let the local ruler pick the bishop.

A local secular ruler could stimulate the economy of his domain, and thereby collect more tax revenue, by giving his subjects more liberty and more participation in politics. The local ruler was required to raise enough tax revenue so that he could provide sufficient rewards to his essential supporters in order to secure their loyalty. But liberalization and democratization would also make his subjects more assertive, which in itself made the ruler's hold on power less secure. Generally, a shrewd ruler would permit his people just enough liberty that he could raise sufficient tax revenue to provide his essential supporters with just enough rewards to keep them loyal (see selectorate theory for a thorough explanation of these trade-offs). In this specific context, the ruler of a diocese also had to consider whether to raise additional money, by risking liberalization, to convince the pope to compromise on the choice of bishop.

Under this incentive structure, if the pope's influence in a region was strong, the local ruler would see little point in liberalizing his state. He would raise more tax revenue, but it would not be enough to get out from under the pope's thumb which was just too strong. Liberalization would make his people more assertive and the pope would incite them to revolt. The pope would get both the money and his choice of bishop. Thus, the local ruler decided that oppressing his people was the sounder strategy for political survival.

On the other hand, if the pope's influence in the region was weak, the local ruler calculated that liberalizing his state, thereby making it more prosperous, could give him enough leverage to get his choice of bishop. The pope would try to incite the people to revolt, but to weak effect. Thus, the local ruler could hold out for longer against the pope, and the pope would concede. The local ruler would get his preferred bishop, and the pope would get the money.

In the Catholic regions of Europe, the pope's influence was weaker the further away a region was from Rome because in general it is difficult to project power over long distances and across difficult terrain such as mountains. This, Bueno de Mesquita argues, is why the northern regions of Europe, such as England and the Netherlands, became more prosperous and free than the southern regions. He further argues that this dynamic is what enabled the Protestant Reformation, which mostly happened in northern Europe. The northern parts of Europe were so prosperous and the influence of the pope there was so weak, their local rulers could reject the pope's bishops indefinitely.

== See also ==
- Caesaropapism
- Cestui que
- Charter of Liberties
- The clash between the Church and the Empire
- Cluniac Reforms
- First Council of the Lateran
- History of the papacy (1048–1257)
- Papal appointment
- Papal deposing power
- Petrus Crassus
- Quia Emptores
- Statutes of Mortmain
- Renaissance of the year 1000
