= Richard Marshall (priest) =

English clergyman and academic administrator

Richard Marshall D.D. (1517 – in or after 1575) was an English clergyman and academic administrator at the University of Oxford.

Marshall was elected Dean (head) of Christ Church, Oxford in 1553, a post he held until 1559. He was Vice-Chancellor of Oxford University during 1552–4.

== Life ==
He is thought to have been the son of William Marshall, was said to be from Kent, and was a scholar of Corpus Christi College, Oxford, from 1532 until 1538. He graduated B.A. 5 December 1537, and his subsequent degrees were M.A. 5 October 1540, B.D. October 1544, and D.D. 18 July 1552. He became fellow of his college in 1538, but migrated to Christ Church about 1540, becoming a student there.

At Corpus Marshall was Greek lecturer, and noted as a strong Roman Catholic traditionalist. He was one of the witnesses against John Dunne in October 1538. In Edward VI's reign he is said to have turned Protestant, and was vice-chancellor in 1552, but he changed his views under Mary I. He also dug up the body of Peter Martyr's wife in Christ Church, and had it cast on his dunghill.

Marshall became dean of Christ Church in 1553, and is probably the Marshall or Martial who held prebends at St. Paul's and Winchester during Mary's reign. In 1554 he took part in the Oxford disputation on transubstantiation, was one of the witnesses against Thomas Cranmer, aided in the degradation of Nicholas Ridley. He almost caught John Jewel when he fled from Oxford after his recantation in the autumn of 1555.

At Elizabeth I's accession Marshall lost his preferments. He retained powerful friends, as he had been domestic chaplain to Lord Arundell. He found refuge with Henry Clifford, 2nd Earl of Cumberland and Christopher Metcalf in the north. He was captured and brought to London, and signed a fresh recantation.

Marshall then worked again as a Catholic priest, among the northern recusants. Finally he went into exile, in Leuven and Douai.

Academic offices
Preceded by James Brokes	Vice-Chancellor of Oxford University; 1552–1554	Succeeded by John Warner
Preceded by Richard Cox	Dean of Christ Church, Oxford; 1553–1559	Succeeded by George Carew
