= Norman Anonymous =

Author (fl. between 1075 and 1150)

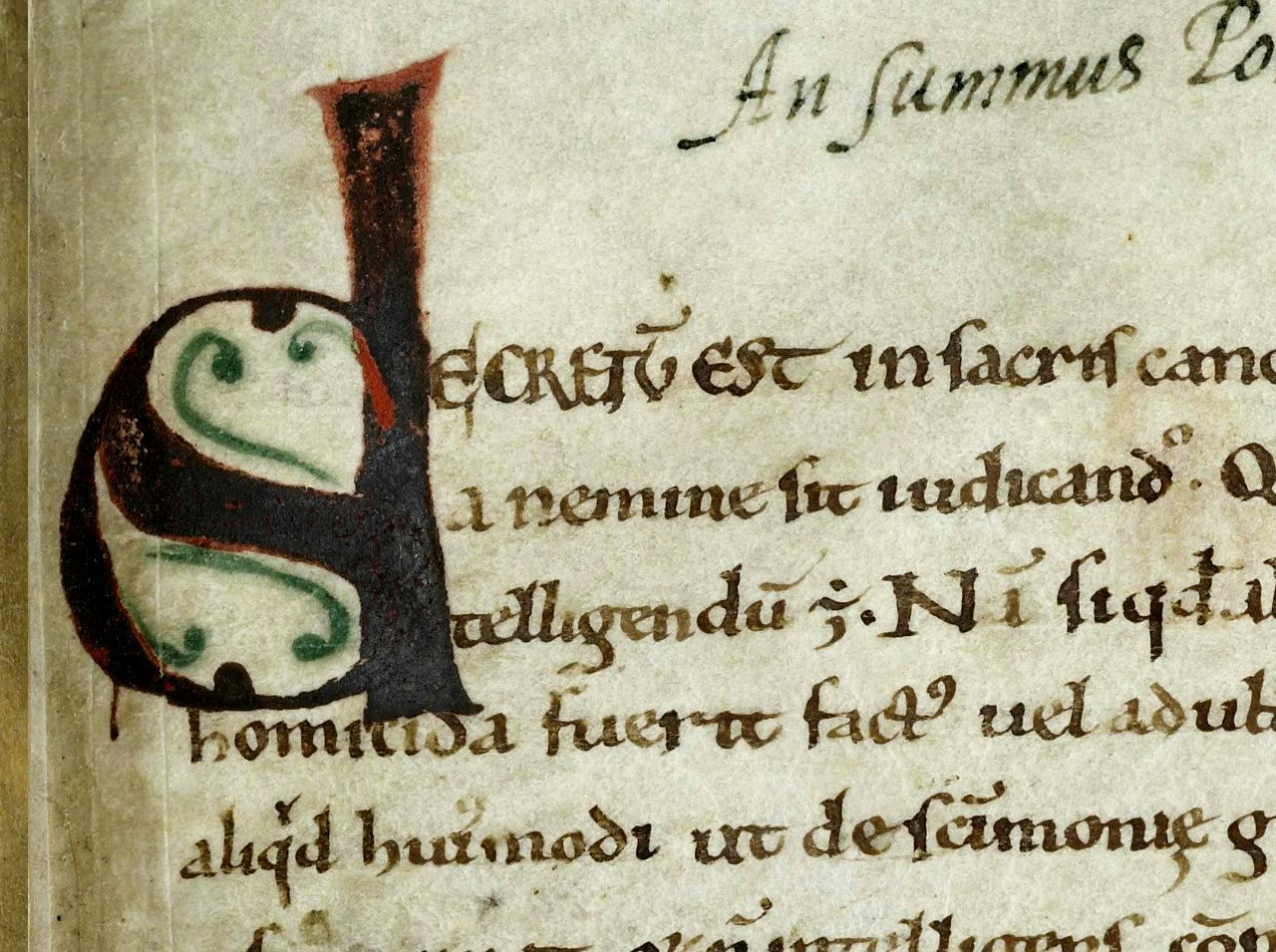
Illuminated letter from the first page of Tractatus Eboracenses, MS415 Corpus Christi College, Cambridge

The Norman Anonymous (sometimes Anonymous of Rouen or Anonymous of York) is the name given to the author of a collection of treatises, the Tractatus Eboracenses, dealing with the relationship between kings and the Catholic Church, written c. 1100. The author, whose identity remains a mystery, offered some of the most strongly worded defences of royal authority and even superiority to the Catholic Church ever uttered in the medieval West. Surviving in just a single manuscript, the text is the only contribution made by the Anglo-Norman realm to the Investiture Controversy.

== See also ==
- Dominium mundi
- A Dispute Between a Priest and a Knight
- Proverbia Grecorum
