= Marsilius of Padua =

Italian philosopher (c. 1275–1342)

- Fifteenth-century engraved portrait of Marsilius of Padua in his study
- Born: c. 1275; Commune of Padua
- Died: c. 1342; Munich, Duchy of Bavaria, Holy Roman Empire

Education
- Education: University of Paris

Philosophical work
- Era: Medieval philosophy
- Region: Western philosophy
- School: Scholasticism
- Main interests: Theology; Politics
- Notable works: Defensor pacis
- Notable ideas: Criticism of the plenitude of power

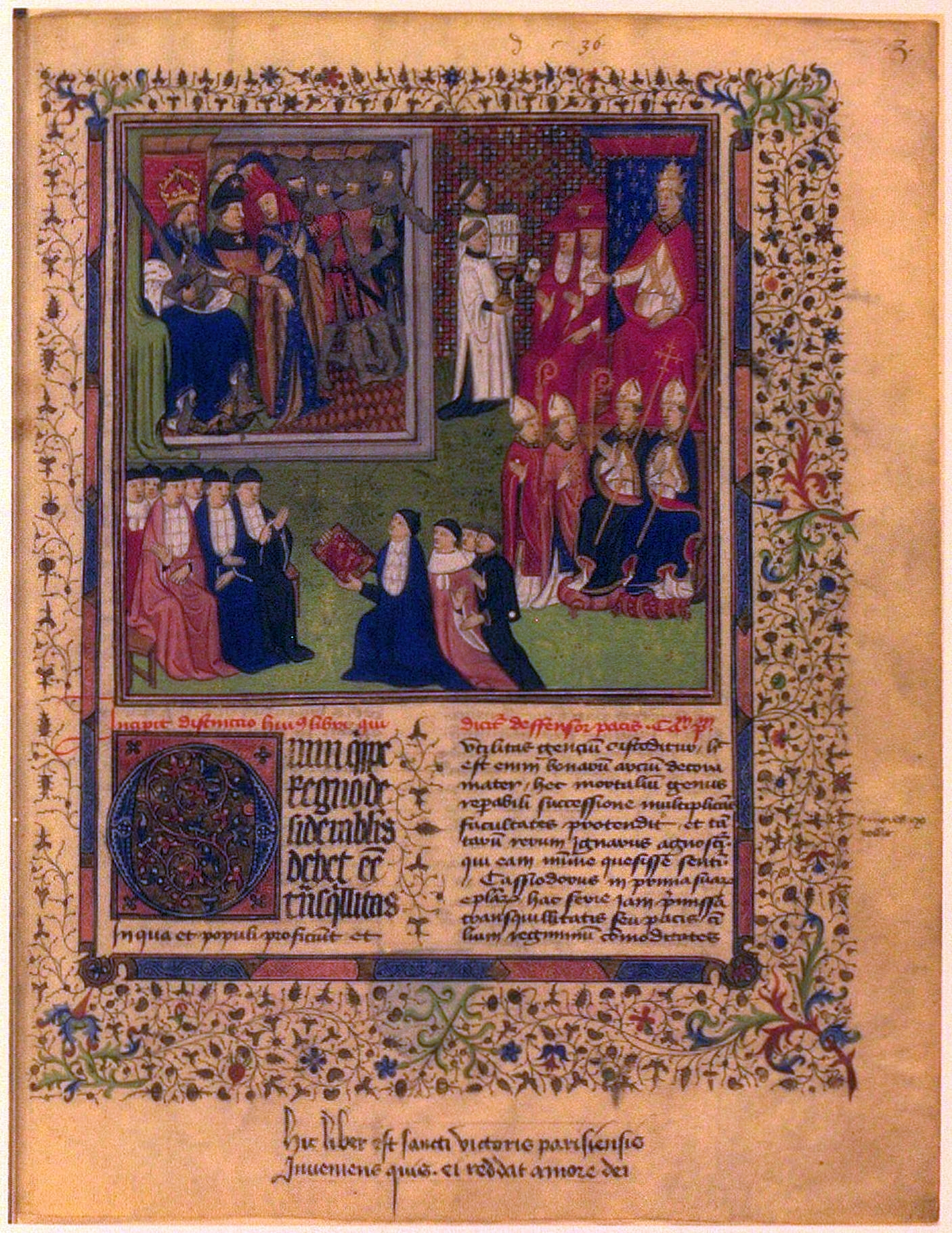
Miniature on the first page of a luxury manuscript of the Defensor pacis (15th century). Marsilius is shown presenting a copy to the Emperor

Marsilius of Padua (Italian: Marsilio da Padova; born Marsilio Mainardi, Marsilio de i Mainardini or Marsilio Mainardini; c. 1275 – c. 1342) was an Italian scholar, trained in medicine, who practised a variety of professions. He was also an important 14th-century political figure. His political treatise Defensor pacis (The Defender of Peace), an attempt to refute papal claims to a "plenitude of power" in affairs of both church and state, is seen by some scholars as the most revolutionary political treatise written in the later Middle Ages. It is one of the first examples of a trenchant critique of ultramontanism in Western Europe. Marsilius is sometimes seen as a forerunner of the Protestant reformation, because many of his beliefs were later adopted by John Calvin and Martin Luther.

== Early years ==
Marsilius was born in Padua, an important city near Venice, circa 1275. He probably studied medicine at the University of Padua and later went to the University of Paris, where he became a devoted admirer of Aristotle, whom he called 'the divine philosopher". He served as rector of the University of Paris approximately 1312–1313. It is probable that he taught at the University of Paris before and after his tenure as rector.

== Political theory and later years ==
Marsilius wrote Defensor pacis in 1324. This treatise was written in the context of a power struggle between Pope John XXII and Louis of Bavaria (or Ludwig of Bavaria), the elected candidate for Holy Roman Emperor. Louis' policies in the Italian peninsula, where the Empire had important territories, threatened papal territorial sovereignty. In 1323, Louis had sent an army to Italy to protect Milan against the powerful Kingdom of Naples. Naples, along with France, was a strong ally of John XXII. John excommunicated Louis and demanded that he relinquish his claim to the imperial crown. Louis responded to John XXII with fresh provocations.

In Defensor pacis, Marsilius sought to demonstrate, by arguments from reason (in Dictio I of the text) and by argument from authority (in Dictio II) the independence of the Holy Roman Empire from the Papacy and the emptiness of the prerogatives alleged to have been usurped by the Roman pontiffs. A number of Marsilius's views were declared to be heretical by Pope John XXII in 1327.

Most of Defensor pacis is devoted to theology. Relying heavily on Scripture, Marsilius seeks to show that Jesus did not claim to possess any temporal power and that he did not intend his church to exercise any. On the contrary, Scripture teaches that the church should be thoroughly subordinate to the state in both secular and spiritual matters. All authority in the church lies with the whole body of the faithful, the secular ruler who acts as the people's representative, and general councils called by the secular ruler. Some of Marsilius's arguments on these themes had a marked influence during the Reformation.

Today, Marsilius's Defensor pacis is best remembered not for its theology but for its political philosophy and legal theory. Marsilius agrees with Aristotle that the purpose of government is the rational fulfilment of humans' natural desire for a "sufficient life". However, he goes beyond Aristotle in embracing a form of republicanism that views the people as the only legitimate source of political authority. Sovereignty lies with the people, and the people should elect, correct, and, if necessary, depose its political leaders. Democracy, Marsilius argues, is the best form of government because it tends to produce the wisest laws, protects the common benefit, promotes "sufficiency of life", and produces laws that are most likely to be obeyed.

Marsilius and John of Jandun, who has sometimes been credited as a co-author of Defensor pacis, left France for Louis' court in Bavaria. Louis admitted Marsilius and John to his circle. Others were also under his protection, including Michael of Cesena and the philosopher William of Ockham, an advocate of an early form of church and state separation. In 1326, Marsilius accompanied Louis to Italy, where he preached or circulated written attacks against the pope. The Lord of Milan Galeazzo I Visconti, suspected of conspiring with John XXII, was deposed, and Louis was crowned King of Italy in Milan in 1327.

In January 1328, Louis entered Rome and had himself crowned emperor by the aged senator Sciarra Colonna, called captain of the Roman people. Three months later, Louis published a decree declaring "Jacque de Cahors"—Pope John XXII—deposed on grounds of heresy. He then installed the Franciscan Pietro Rainalducci as Nicholas V. Nicholas was deposed upon Louis's departure from Rome in 1329.

In Bavaria, as imperial vicar, Marsilius persecuted the clergy who had remained faithful to John XXII. In recompense for his services, he was appointed archbishop of Milan, and John of Jandun obtained from Louis IV the bishopric of Ferrara.

Marsilius also composed a treatise De translatione [Romani] imperii, which some authorities consider is a rearrangement of a similar work by Landolfo Colonna called De jurisdictione imperatoris in causa matrimoniali. This work, and Marsilius's variation, sought to justify the exclusive jurisdiction of the emperor in matrimonial affairs: Louis of Bavaria had recently annulled the marriage of the son of the King of Bohemia.

== Death ==
Marsilius died in Munich around 1342, still unreconciled to the Church.

== Legacy ==
Some authorities consider Defensor pacis one of the most important political and religious works of the fourteenth century Europe. In the Defensor minor, Marsilius completed and elaborated on different points in the doctrine laid down in the Defensor pacis. He dealt here with problems concerning ecclesiastical jurisdiction, penance, indulgences, crusades and pilgrimages, vows, excommunication, the general church council, marriage and divorce, and unity with the Greek Orthodox Church. In this work, he even more clearly articulates imperial supremacy over the Church.

== Theological beliefs ==
Marsilius saw the scriptures as being above the church and believed the papacy to be created by human arrangement rather than being divinely ordained.
