= Plenitudo potestatis =

Term employed by medieval canonists

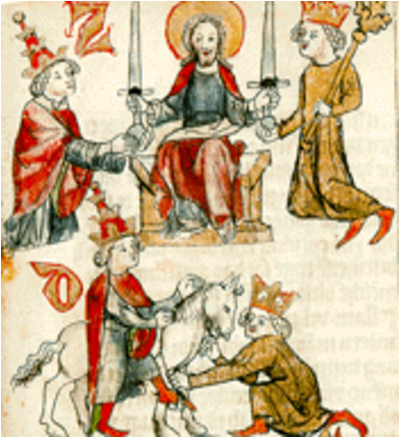
Illumination of the Sachsenspiegel or Mirror of the Saxons, drafted around 1220–1235, is a collection of customary laws compiled by Eike von Repgow (1180–1235). Encouraged by his master, Hoyer von Falkenstein, a high Saxon nobleman, who reproduced a German version of the original Latin book itself, lost today. At the top of the illumination, Christ hands two swords to the Pope and the Holy Emperor, an allegory taken from Luke 22:38, originally created by St. Bernard of Clairvaux, expressing the distinction between the two powers: spiritual and political. At the bottom of the illumination, the emperor holds the pope's stirrup. Although it seems that the author's intention was to show that the powers of the pope and the emperor are equal and distinct, traditionally the illumination was interpreted as demonstrating that the pope is lord of the emperor and has a more sublime, important and excellent power.

Plenitudo potestatis (fullness of power) was a term employed by medieval canonists to describe the jurisdictional power of the papacy. In the thirteenth century, the canonists used the term plenitudo potestatis to characterize the power of the pope within the church, or, more rarely, the pope's prerogative in the secular sphere. However, during the thirteenth century the pope's plenitudo potestatis expanded as the Church became increasingly centralized, and the pope's presence made itself felt every day in legislation, judicial appeals, and finance.

Although plenitudo potestatis had been used in canonical writings since the time of Pope Leo I (440-461), Pope Innocent III (1198–1216) was the first pope to use the term regularly as a description of papal governmental power. Many historians have concluded that the pope's jurisdiction within the church was unchallenged. Essentially, the pope was the highest judge in the Church. His decisions were absolute and could not be abrogated by inferior members of the ecclesiastical hierarchy.

== Bibliography (chronological order) ==
- (in German) Hof, Hans, "Plenitudo potestatis und imitatio imperii zur Zeit Innocenz III", Zeitschrift für katholische Theologie, 77, 1954–1955, p. 39-71.
- Watt, John A., "The Use of the Term plenitudo potestatis by Hostiensis", dans Proceedings of the Second International Congress of Medieval Canon Law (1963), éd. S. Kuttner, J. J. Ryan, Cité du Vatican, BAV, 1965, p. 161-187.
- Benson, Robert L. "Plenitudo potestatis : Evolution of a Formula from Gregory VII to Gratian", dans Collectanea Stephan Kuttner. Studia Gratiana 14, 1967, p. 195-217.
- McCready, William D., "Papal Plenitudo Potestatis and the Source of Temporal Authority in Late Medieval Papal Hierocratic Theory", Speculum 48, 1973, p. 654-674.
- (in Italian) Marchetto, Agostino, "In partem sollicitudinis… non in plenitudinem potestatis : evoluzione di una formula di rapporto primato-episcopato", dans Studia in honorem eminentissimi cardinalis Alphonsi M. Stickler, éd. R. J. Castillo Lara, Rome, Libreria Ateneo Salesiano, 1992, p. 269-298.
- (in German) Kéry, Lotte, "De plenitudo potestatis sed non de jure. Eine inquisitio von 1209/1210 gegen Abt Walter von Corbie (X, 5, 1, 22)", dans Licet preter solitum. Ludwig Falkenstein zum 65. Geburtstag, éd. L. Kéry, D. Lohrmann, H. Müller, Aix-la-Chapelle, Shaker Verlag, 1998, p. 91-117.
- Recchia, Alessandro, "L'uso della formula plenitudo potestatis da Leone Magno ad Uguccione da Pisa", Roma, Mursia, 1999.
- Schmidt, Hans-Joachim, "The Papal and Imperial Concept of plenitudo potestatis : the Influence of Pope Innocent III on Emperor Frederick II"", dans Pope Innocent III and his World, éd. J. C. Moore, Aldershot, Ashgate, 1999, p. 305-314.
- (in French) Julien Théry, « Innocent III et les débuts de la théocratie pontificale», dans Mémoire dominicaine, 21 (2007), p. 33-37.
- (in French) Julien Théry, « Le triomphe de la théocratie pontificale, du IIIe concile du Latran au pontificat de Boniface VIII (1179–1303) », in Structures et dynamiques religieuses dans les sociétés de l’Occident latin (1179–1449), ed. by Marie-Madeleine de Cevins et Jean-Michel Matz, Rennes : Presses Universitaires de Rennes, 2010, p. 17-31, online.
- (in Italian) Rizzi, Marco "Plenitudo potestatis. Dalla teologia politica alla teoria dello stato assoluto", dans Images, cultes, liturgies. Les connotations politiques du message religieux, éd. P. Ventrone, L. Gaffuri, Rome, Paris, École Française de Rome, Publications de la Sorbonne, 2014, p. 49-60.
- (in French) Julien Théry-Astruc, « Introduction », in Innocent III et le Midi (Cahiers de Fanjeaux, 50), Toulouse, Privat, 2015, p. 11-35, online].
