= Alvarus Pelagius =

Spanish lawyer and bishop

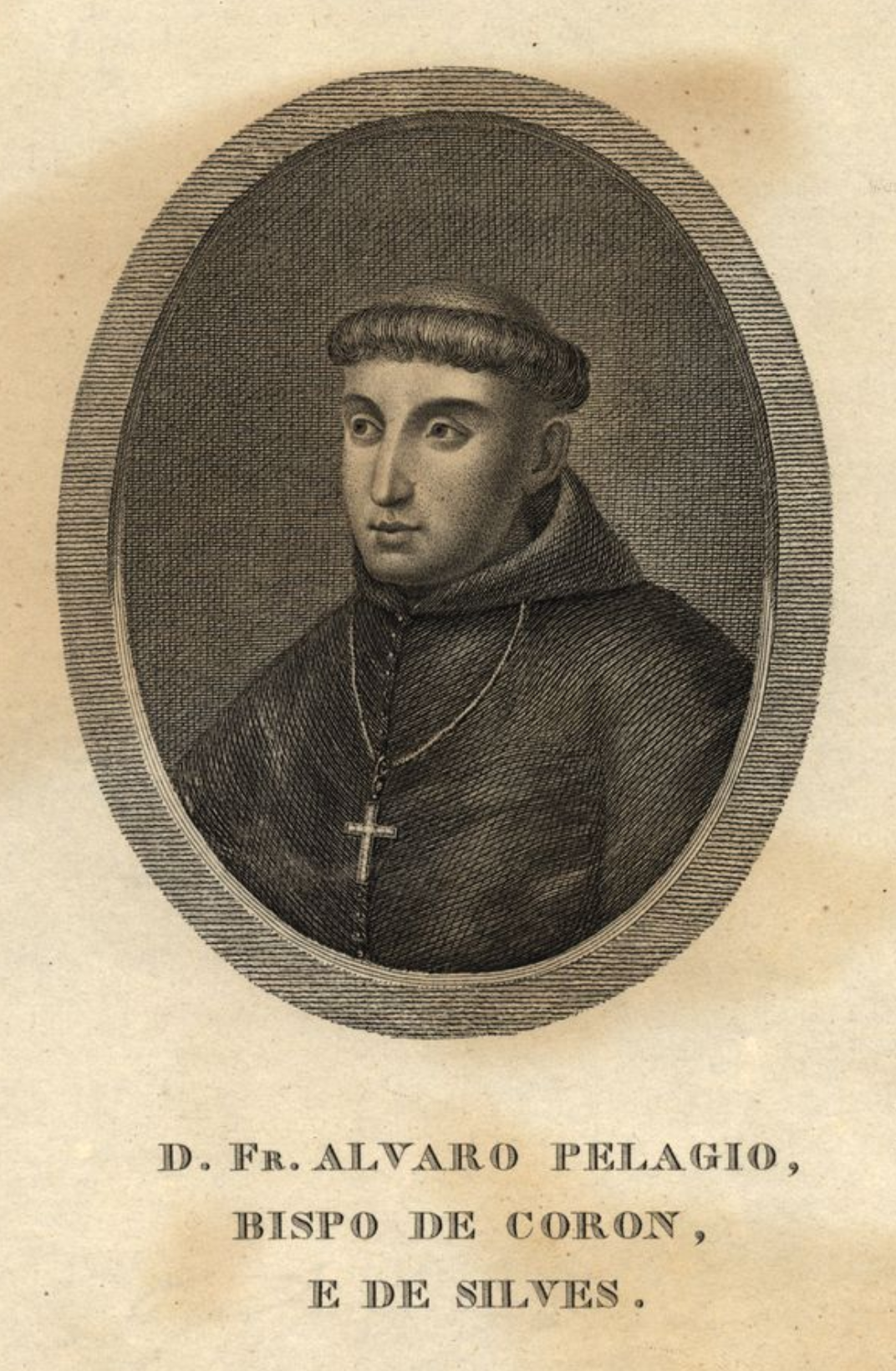
Print of Alvarus Pelagius (Biblioteca Nacional de Portugal)

Alvarus Pelagius (Galician: Álvaro Pais; c. 1280 – 25 January 1352) was a celebrated Galician canonist.

== Life ==
Alvarus was born at Salnés, Galicia. He studied Canon law at Bologna, but in 1304 resigned his benefices, and entered the Franciscan Order. He is said to have been a pupil of Duns Scotus and to have been tutor to the children of Pedro Afonso, Count of Barcelos. Certain it is that he became penitentiary to Pope John XXII at Avignon, that he enjoyed much favour with this pontiff, and was employed by him to refute the claims of the antipope Pietro Rainalducci of Corbario. In 1333 Alvarus became titular Bishop of Coron in Achaia, and two years later was appointed to the See of Silves in Portugal. He also served as Apostolic nuncio in Portugal, but was not created cardinal, as some writers have asserted. He died in Seville, where he was buried in the Monastery of St. Clare.

== Works ==
Alvarus is chiefly remarkable for his work De planctu ecclesiae libri duo. This work, begun at Avignon in 1330, completed in 1332, corrected in 1335 and again in 1340 at Compostela, is notable not only for its extreme defence of ecclesiastical rights but still more, perhaps, for the freedom and force with which the author assails and rebukes the ecclesiastical abuses of his time. Alvarus has been reproached by St. Antoninus and others with having too far favoured the error of the Fraticelli about poverty, but, as Sbaralea shows, it is not difficult to justify him against this charge. On the then agitated question of poverty in the Franciscan Order he wrote with less passion and with more weight than Ubertino da Casale, although he addressed almost the same reproaches as the latter to the relaxed friars within the order. The De planctu was first published at Ulm in 1474. This edition is very rare, and is not free from error. Later editions appeared at Venice (1500) and at Lyons (1517).

Besides the "De planctu", Wadding attributed to Alvarus the following: "Collyrium adversus haereses"; "Speculum regum" (one book); "Super sentent. libros 4"; "Apologia contra Marsilum Patav. et Guliel. Ocham"; and other unedited works.
