= List of Medieval European scholars =

This is a list of philosophers and other scholars, historians and preachers – very much overlapping activities – working in the Christian tradition in Western Europe during the medieval period, including the early Middle Ages. See also scholasticism.

== A ==
- Abbo of Fleury (or Abbon), (945–1004)
- Abélard, Pierre, (1079–1142)
- Abner of Burgos, (1270–1348)
- Acca of Hexham, (660–740)
- Adam of Bremen
- Adam de Buckfield
- Adam Parvipontanus
- Adam de Wodeham
- Adam Pulchrae Mulieris/Adam de Puteorumvilla
- Adelard of Bath
- Adomnan of Iona, (c. 624–704)
- Adrian of Canterbury, (or Hadrian, born before 637, died 710)
- Aelfheah, (died 1012)
- Ailred of Rievaulx
- Ælfric of Eynsham (the Grammarian), (died c. 1010)
- Æthelbert of York, (sometimes Æthelberht, Albert, Ælberht, Aethelberht, or Ælbert; died 780)
- Aethelwulf, (poet)
- Alain, bishop of Auxerre
- Alain de Lille / Alanus de Insulis / Montepessulano, (c. 1128–1202)
- Albric of London
- Alberich of Reims, (c. 1085 – 1141)
- Albert of Saxony, (1316–1390)
- Albertus Magnus, (c. 1200–1280)
- Alcuin of York, (c. 735–804)
- King Aldfrith of Northumbria, (died 705)
- Aldhelm of Malmesbury, (c. 639–709)
- Alexander of Hales, (died 1245)
- Alexander Nequam/Neckam/of St Alban's
- Alfred of Sareshel/Alfredus Anglicus
- Amalric of Bena/Bène, (died c. 1204–1207)
- Aimoin, (born c. 965—died after 1008)
- Anno of Cologne, (c 1010–1075)
- Anselm of Laon, (died 1117)
- Anselm of Canterbury, (1034–1109)
- Ardengus
- Arnaldus de Villa Nova
- Arnold Fitz Thedmar, (1201–1274/5)
- Arnulf of Lisieux, (1104/9–1184)

== B ==
- Bartholomaeus Arnoldi von Usingen (1465–1532)
- Bartholomew of Bologna
- Bartolus de Saxoferrato
- Bede, (672/673–735)
- Benedict Biscop, (c. 628–690)
- Benedict of Nursia
- Bernard of Chartres
- Bernard of Clairvaux, (1090–1153)
- Bernard Silvestris
- Bero Magni de Ludosia
- Berthold of Moosburg
- Boetius of Dacia
- Boisil, (d 664)
- Bonaventure
- Burgundio of Pisa
- Jean Buridan, (died c. 1359)
- Byrhtferth of Ramsey, (fl. c. 986 – c. 1016)

== C ==
- Cesare Cremonini, (1550–1631); alias Caesar Cremoninus
- Chad of Mercia, (died 672)
- Clarembald of Arras
- Colman of Lindisfarne, (605–675)
- Cummian Fada, (591–661/2)
- Cuthbert Tunstall

== D ==
- Daniel of Morley
- Dante Alighieri, (1265–1321)
- David Cranston
- David of Dinant
- Denys the Carthusian
- Domingo Bañez
- Dudo of Saint-Quentin
- (John) Duns Scotus, (c. 1266–1308)
- Saint Dunod, (mid 6th–early 7th c)
- Saint Dunstan, (908–988)
- Durand of St Pourçain

== E ==
- Eadberht of Lindisfarne, (died 698)
- Ecgbert of York, (or Egbert, died 766)
- Meister Eckhart
- Eddius Stephanus, (Stephen of Ripon)
- Edmund of Abingdon
- Elias Bruneti of Bergerac
- Everard of Ypres

== F ==
- Faritius (or Faricius) (died 1117)
- Fernando de Córdoba (1425–1486)
- Finan of Lindisfarne, (died 611)
- Florence of Worcester (died 1118)
- Francis of Marchia
- Francis of Meyronnes
- Francisco Suárez (1548–1617)
- Fulbert of Chartres (952–1028)

== G ==
- Gabriel Biel
- Gaetano of Thiene
- Garlandus Compotista
- Gaunilo(n) of Montmoutiers
- Geoffrey Gaimar
- Geoffrey of Monmouth, (c. 1095 – c. 1155)
- Gerard of Abbeville
- Gerard of Cremona
- Gerbert of Aurillac, (Pope Sylvester II),(946–1003)
- Gerho of Reichersberg
- Gersonides, (1288–1344)
- Gilbert of Poitiers
- Gildas, (6th c)
- Giles of Rome
- Giovanni Girolamo Saccheri
- Girolamo Savonarola
- Gonsalvo of Spain
- Godfrey of Fontaines
- Goscelin of Canterbury or St Bertin, (c. 1040 – c. 1106)
- Pope Gregory I
- Gregory of Rimini
- Guerric of Saint-Quentin
- Guido Terrena

== H ==
- Hadrian of Canterbury (see Adrian)
- Heinrich Totting von Oytha
- Henry Aristippus
- Henry Bate
- Henry of Ghent
- Henry of Harclay
- Henry of Huntingdon, (1080–1160)
- Henry of Langenstein
- Hermann of Carinthia
- Hermann of Reichenau, (1013–1054)
- Hervaeus Natalis
- Heymeric of Camp
- Honorius Augustodunensis/*Honoré d'Autun (1080–1151)
- Hrabanus: Rabanus
- Hugh of St. Cher
- Hugh of St. Victor

== I ==
- Isidore of Seville, (c. 560–636)
- Ivo of Chartres (c. 1040–1115)

== J ==
- James the Deacon, (died after 671)
- James of Metz
- James of Venice
- James of Viterbo
- Jacques de Vitry
- Jan Kanty/John Cantius, (1390–1473)
- Jan Standonck
- Jean Buridan, (c. 1295–1363)
- Jean de la Rochelle
- Jerome of Prague
- Joachim of Flora
- Jocelin, Bishop of Soissons
- Jodocus Trutfetter
- Johann Eck
- Johann von Goch
- Johann Ruchrat von Wesel
- John Baconthorpe
- John Blund
- John Capreolus
- John Dumbleton
- John Fisher
- John of Fordun, (before 1360 – c. 1380)
- John Gerson, (1363–1429)
- John Halgren of Abbeville
- John of Jandun
- John Mair
- John of Mirecourt
- John Pagus
- John of Paris
- John Peckham
- John Poinsot
- John Punch
- John of Reading
- John of Salisbury, (c. 1115–1180)
- John of Wallingford,(fl. 1195–1215)
- Johannes Scotus Eriugena
- John of Seville
- John of Worcester, (died c. 1140)
- John Wyclif, (born 1324)
- Juan Caramuel y Lobkowitz
- Juan de Mariana
- Julian of Toledo, (642–690)

== L ==
- Luis de Molina
- Lupus Servatus (also known as Servatus Lupus) (c. 805–c. 862)

== M ==
- Máeldub (also Maildubh, Maildulf or Meldun), (died c. 675)
- Manegold of Lautenbach
- Marianus Scotus, (1028–1082/3)
- Marsilius of Inghen
- Marsilius of Padua
- Martin of Dacia
- Matthew of Aquasparta
- Matthew Paris, (1200–1259)
- Mechthild of Magdeburg (c. 1207–c. 1282/1294)
- Melchior Cano
- Michael of Massa
- Michael Servetus (1509 or 1511 to 1553)
- Minnborinus of Cologne, (fl 974–986)

== N ==
- Nennius, (9th c)
- Nicholas of Amiens
- Nicholas of Autrecourt
- Nicholas of Cusa
- Nicole Oresme

== O ==
- Odo of Châteauroux
- Orderic Vitalis, (1075–1142)
- St Oswald of Worcester or York, (925–992)
- Otric

== P ==
- Paul of Pergula
- Paul of Venice
- Peter Abelard, (1079–1142)
- Peter Alfonsi
- Peter Auriol
- Peter of Auvergne
- Peter le Bar
- Peter of Candia
- Peter of Capua the Elder
- Peter Ceffons
- Peter of Corbeil
- Peter Damian
- Peter Helias
- Peter Lombard
- Peter Olivi
- Peter of Pisa
- Peter of Poitiers (Chancellor)
- Peter de Rivo
- Peter of Spain (usually identified with Pope John XXI)
- Peter the Venerable
- Pierre d'Ailly
- Pierre de Maricourt
- Philip the Chancellor
- Plato of Tivoli
- Prévostin of Cremona

== R ==
- Rabanus Maurus Magnentius (also Hrabanus or Rhabanus), (780–856)
- Paschasius Radbertus
- Radulphus Brito
- Radulphus de Longo Campo
- Ralph of Beauvais
- Ralph de Diceto, (c. 1120 – c. 1202)
- Ralph Strode
- Ramon Lull
- Raoul Ardens
- Ratramnus
- Raymond Féraud
- Raymond Gaufredi
- Reginald of Durham, (died c. 1190)
- Reginald Pecock
- Remigius of Auxerre (c. 841–908)
- Richard Brinkley
- Richard of Campsall
- Richard of Devizes, (fl late 12th c)
- Richard l'Evêque
- Richard Fishacre
- Richard Ferrybridge
- Richard Fitzralph
- Richard de Fournival
- Richard Kilvington
- Richard of Middleton
- Richard Rufus of Cornwall
- Richard of Saint-Laurent
- Richard of St. Victor, (died 1173)
- Richard Swineshead
- Robert Blund
- Robert of Courson
- Robert of Gloucester, (fl.1260–1300)
- Robert Grosseteste, (c. 1175–1253)
- Robert Holcot
- Robert Kilwardby, (died 1279)
- Robert of Melun
- Robert Pullus
- Robert de Sorbon, (1201–1274)
- Robert of Torigni, (1106–1186)
- Robertus Anglicus
- Roger Bacon, (1214–1294)
- Roger Marston
- Roger of Hereford, (active c. 1178 – 1198)
- Roger of Wendover, (died 6 May 1236)
- Roland of Cremona
- Roscelin of Compiègne

== S ==
- Saxo Grammaticus, (c. 1150 – c. 1220)
- Servatus Lupus
- Siger of Brabant, (1240–1284)
- Simon of Faversham
- Simon of Tournai
- Snorri Sturluson, (1179–1241)
- Stephen Langton, (c. 1150–1228)
- Stephen of Ripon, (died 709)
- Francisco Suárez, (1548–1617)
- Svend Aggesen, (born c. 1145)
- Symeon of Durham, (died after 1129)
- Symphorien Champier, (1471–1539)

== T ==
- Theodore of Tarsus (or Canterbury), (602–690)
- Theodoric of Freiberg (c.1250 – c.1311)
- Theodulf of Orléans, (c. 750/60–821)
- Thierry of Chartres/Theodoricus Carnotensis
- Thietmar of Merseburg, (975–1018)
- Thomas Aquinas, (1225–1274)
- Thomas Becket, (1118–1170)
- Thomas Bradwardine, (c. 1290–1349)
- Thomas of Chobham
- Thomas of Erfurt
- Thomas Gallus
- Thomas à Kempis, (1380–1471)
- Thomas Netter of Walden
- Thomas of Sutton
- Thomas Wykes of Osney, (1222–1292)
- Thomas Wilton
- Tilmo, (fl 690)
- Tysilio or Sulio, (died 640)

== U ==
- Ulrich of Strassburg
- Urso of Salerno

== V ==
- Vital du Four
- Vitalian, (600–672)
- Vitello, (1230–1314)

== W ==
- Walter Burley
- Walter Chatton
- Walter of Château-Thierry
- Walter of Mortagne
- Walter of Oxford, (died 1151)
- Warner of Rouen
- Wilfrid, (c. 633–709/710)
- William of Alnwick
- William of Auvergne
- William of Auxerre
- William de Brailes, (active 1230–1260)
- William of Champeaux
- William of Conches
- William of Durham
- William of Falagar
- William Heytesbury
- William of Jumieges
- William of Lucca
- William of Malmesbury, (1080–1143)
- William de la Mare
- William of Moerbeke
- William of Ockham, (c. 1285–1349)
- William of Poitiers, (1020–1090)
- William of Saint Albans, (fl. 1170)
- William of Saint-Amour
- William of Sherwood
- William of Ware
- Witelo
- William of Poitiers
