= Terminism =

Soteriological presupposition

Terminism is the Christian doctrine that there is a time limit for repentance from sin, after which God no longer wills the conversion and salvation of that person. This limit is asserted to be known to God alone, making conversion urgent. Among pietists such as Quakers, the doctrine permitted the co-existence, over the span of a human life, of human free will and God's sovereignty.

== Terminism in salvation ==
Terminism in salvation is also mentioned in Max Weber's famous sociological work The Protestant Ethic and the Spirit of Capitalism. "[Terminism] assumes that grace is offered to all men, but for everyone either once at a definite moment in his life or at some moment for the last time" (Part II, Ch. 4, Section B). Weber offers in the same paragraph that terminism is "generally (though unjustly) attributed to Pietism by its opponents".

== See also ==
- Bartholomaeus Arnoldi von Usingen
- Nicholas of Autrecourt
- Gabriel Biel
- Jean Buridan
- John Cantius
- Pierre Ceffons
- Johann Eck
- Robert Holcot
- John Mair
- John of Mirecourt
- William of Ockham
- Henry of Oyta
- Durandus of Saint-Pourçain
- Adam de Wodeham
