= Evrard =

French and English name

Evrard or Évrard is a French and English name derived from the Germanic personal name Eberhard.

== Given name ==
- Everard des Barres (died after 1176), Third Grand Master of the Knights Templa
- Évrard of Béthune (died c. 1212), 13th-century Flemish author
- Évrard Chauveau (1660–1739), French painter
- Évrard d'Espinques (active between 1440 and 1494), French manuscript illuminator
- Evrard d'Orleans (1292–1357), French gothic sculptor, painter, and architect
- Evrard Godefroid (1932–2013), Belgian cyclist
- Évrard Titon du Tillet (1677–1762), French historian
- Evrard Wendenbaum (born 1979), French explorer
- Everard of Ypres (12th century), French scholastic philosopher and Cistercian monk
- Evrard Zag (born 1990), Ivorian footballer

== Surname ==
- Adèle Evrard (1792–1889), Belgian painter
- André Evrard (1936–2021), Swiss painter
- Auguste Evrard (born 2000), French politician
- Bénédicte Evrard (born 1975), Belgian gymnast
- Claude Evrard (1933–2020), French actor
- Francis Evrard (born 1946), French-Belgian serial rapist and pedophile
- Jane Evrard (1893–1984), French musician
- Lydie Evrard, French engineer
- Nicky Evrard (born 1995), Belgian footballer
- Perpète Evrard (1662–1727), Flemish painter
- Peter Evrard (born 1974), Belgian singer
- Ray Evrard (1895–1974), Second president of the Green Bay Football Corporation
