= Bernard of Auvergne =

French Dominican theologian and bishop-elect of Clermont

Start of Bernard's critique of James of Viterbo in the manuscript Toulouse 744

Bernard of Auvergne was a French Dominican theologian and philosopher who was the bishop-elect of Clermont from 1304 to 1307. He is known for his defence of Thomism.

== Life ==
Bernard was a native of Gannat. He entered the Dominican Order at Clermont.

As a Bachelor of Theology, Bernard lectured on Peter Lombard's Sentences at the University of Paris at an unknown date. It is unknown, however, he ever became a regent master. In 1302 or 1303, he became the prior of the convent of Saint-Jacques in Paris. In 1303, he led the convent in opposing Pope Boniface VIII's bull Unam sanctam. In 1304, he was elected to succeed Peter of Auvergne as bishop of Clermont. His election was disputed and ultimately quashed by Pope Clement V in 1307.

== Works ==
Bernard was a Thomist and a staunch defender of Thomas Aquinas against his critics, for which he earned the nickname Malleus (hammer). His commentary on the Sentences is partially extant in a Prague manuscript copy covering only the first book. It was printed at Lyon in 1519. Among his other works are five questions he answered in a public disputation and four sermons he preached between 1301 and 1305. In addition, an anonymous impugnatio (attack) against Giles of Rome is often but not universally attributed to him.

Bernard's most important writings are his three reprobationes, also called impugnationes or improbationes. These were "hostile reviews" or "impugnments" responding to some of the quodlibetal answers of Godfrey of Fontaines, James of Viterbo and Henry of Ghent. They were composed in that order. The reprobatio to Godfrey was written between 1298 and 1304 and that to Henry was finished by 1315. The reprobationes were widely read, being cited by John Capreolus, Peter of Palude, Henry of Herford, James of Metz, Hervaeus Natalis, Durand of Saint-Pourçain, John Baconthorpe, Michael of Massa and Giovanni Pico della Mirandola. Two full and four fragmentary manuscript copies of the reprobatio to Godfrey are known; five copies of the reprobatio to James; and nine of that of Henry.

Against Godfrey and Henry, Bernard defends Aquinas' metaphysical notion of the composition of essence and existence. With Godfrey, he critiques James of Viterbo's notion of divine ideas whereby they have a separate existence from God himself while not actual existence until created. On economic questions, Bernard rejects Henry of Ghent's defence of money-changing (campsoria) as too involved. The ethical money-changer (campsor) is justly compensated for his services and there is no more that needs to be said. He also rejects Henry's early view of rents, arguing that a rental contract created a transferrable "right to receive money" (ius percipiendi pecuniam). Henry himself eventual yielded to this view.
