= Syncategorematic term =

Concept of logic or linguistics

In logic and linguistics, an expression is syncategorematic if it lacks a denotation but can nonetheless affect the denotation of a larger expression which contains it. Syncategorematic expressions are contrasted with categorematic expressions, which have their own denotations.

For example, consider the following rules for interpreting the plus sign. The first rule is syncategorematic since it gives an interpretation for expressions containing the plus sign but does not give an interpretation for the plus sign itself. On the other hand, the second rule does give an interpretation for the plus sign itself, so it is categorematic.

1. Syncategorematic: For any numeral symbols "$n$" and "$m$", the expression "$n + m$" denotes the sum of the numbers denoted by "$n$" and "$m$".
2. Categorematic: The plus sign "$+$" denotes the operation of addition.

Syncategorematicity was a topic of research in medieval philosophy since syncategorematic expressions cannot stand for any of Aristotle's categories despite their role in forming propositions. Medieval logicians and grammarians thought that quantifiers and logical connectives were necessarily syncategorematic. Contemporary research in formal semantics has shown that categorematic definitions can be given for these expressions in which they denote generalized quantifiers, but it remains an open question whether syncategorematicity plays any role in natural language. Both categorematic and syncategorematic definitions are commonly used in contemporary logic and mathematics.

== Ancient and medieval conception ==
The distinction between categorematic and syncategorematic terms was established in ancient Greek grammar. Words that designate self-sufficient entities (i.e., nouns or adjectives) were called categorematic, and those that do not stand by themselves were dubbed syncategorematic, (i.e., prepositions, logical connectives, etc.). Priscian in his Institutiones grammaticae translates the word as consignificantia. Scholastics retained the difference, which became a dissertable topic after the 13th century revival of logic. William of Sherwood, a representative of terminism, wrote a treatise called Syncategoremata. Later his pupil, Peter of Spain, produced a similar work entitled Syncategoreumata.

== Modern conception ==
In its modern conception, syncategorematicity is seen as a formal feature, determined by the way an expression is defined or introduced in the language. In the standard semantics for propositional logic, the logical connectives are treated syncategorematically. Let us take the connective $\land$ for instance. Its semantic rule is:

$\lVert \phi \land \psi \rVert = 1$ iff $\lVert \phi \rVert = \lVert \psi \rVert = 1$

Thus, its meaning is defined when it occurs in combination with two formulas $\phi$ and $\psi$. It has no meaning when taken in isolation, i.e. $\lVert \land \rVert$ is not defined.

One could however give an equivalent categorematic interpretation using λ-abstraction: $(\lambda b.(\lambda v.b(v)(b)))$, which expects a pair of Boolean-valued arguments, i.e., arguments that are either TRUE or FALSE, defined as $(\lambda x.(\lambda y.x))$ and $(\lambda x.(\lambda y.y))$ respectively. This is an expression of type $\langle \langle t, t \rangle, t \rangle$. Its meaning is thus a binary function from pairs of entities of type truth-value to an entity of type truth-value. Under this definition it would be non-syncategorematic, or categorematic. Note that while this definition would formally define the $\land$ function, it requires the use of $\lambda$-abstraction, in which case the $\lambda$ itself is introduced syncategorematically, thus simply moving the issue up another level of abstraction.

== See also ==
- Compositionality
- Generalized quantifier
- John Pagus
- Lambda calculus
- Logical connective
- Supposition theory
- William of Sherwood
