= Peter Ceffons =

French theologian and philosopher

Peter Ceffons (French: Pierre Ceffons, Latin: Petrus de Ceffons Clarevallensis; fl.1340s) was a French Cistercian theologian and scholastic philosopher, who became Abbot of Clairvaux. He is considered an early humanist for his style.

He lectured on the Sentences at Paris in the late 1340s, using angle as a metaphor. He was influenced by Adam Wodeham, Gregory of Rimini and John of Mirecourt.

He wrote a satirical work Epistola Luciferi ad Cleros, an attack on the secular clergy; it is dated to 1352.
