= Mulieris =

Mulieris may refer to:

- Adam Pulchrae Mulieris, a Paris master who studied under Peter of Lamballe and flourished in the first half of the 13th century.
- Mulieris Towers, twin towers located in the Puerto Madero neighborhood of Buenos Aires, Argentina.
- Mulieris Dignitatem, a 1988 apostolic letter by John Paul II on the dignity of women.
