= Lambert of Auxerre =

13th century logical and author

Lambert of Auxerre was a medieval 13th century logician best known for writing the book "Summa Lamberti" or simply "Logica" in the mid 1250s which became an authoritative textbook on logic in the Western tradition. He was a Dominican in the Dominican house at Auxerre. His contemporaries were Peter of Spain, William of Sherwood, and Roger Bacon.

== Works and Translations ==
- Logica (Summa Lamberti), First edition of the Latin text by Franco Alessio, Firenze, La Nuova Italia, 1971.
- Logica, or Summa Lamberti, translated with notes and introduction by Thomas S. Maloney, Notre Dame University Press, 2015.
- Properties of Terms, in Norman Kretzmann, Eleonore Stump, trans., in Cambridge Translations of Medieval Philosophical Texts, Vol. 1: Logic and the Philosophy of Language, Cambridge: Cambridge University Press, 1988, pp. 102–162.
- Alain de Libera, Le traité De appellatione de Lambert de Lagny (Lambert d’Auxerre), Archives d’histoire doctrinale et littéraire du Moyen Age, 48, pp. 227–285, 1982.
