= William of Sherwood =

English scholastic philosopher, logician and teacher

William of Sherwood or William Sherwood (Latin: Guillielmus de Shireswode; c. 1200 – c. 1272), with numerous variant spellings, (Note: Including William Shirwood, William of Shyreswood, and William of Shireswood.) was a medieval English scholastic philosopher, logician, and teacher. Little is known of his life, but he is thought to have studied in Paris, was a master at Oxford in 1252, treasurer of Lincoln from 1254/1258 onwards, and a rector of Aylesbury.

He was the author of two books which were an important influence on the development of scholastic logic: Introductiones in Logicam (Introduction to Logic), and Syncategoremata. These are the first known works to deal in a systematic way with what is now called supposition theory, known in William's time as the logica moderna.

== Life ==
William was probably born in Nottinghamshire, between 1200 and 1210. In common with many educated English men of that time, he may have studied at Oxford University or the University of Paris, or both. There are examples in his logical work which suggest he was a master at Paris. (For example, No man lectures at Paris unless he is a smart person and Whatever runs has feet, the Seine runs, ergo the Seine has feet). Further, those logicians who were influenced by his work also worked in Paris, somewhat reinforcing this thesis, including Peter of Spain (c. 1245) and Lambert of Auxerre (c. 1250). During the years 1235 and 1250, he was possibly a lecturer on logic at Paris.

He is thought to have become treasurer of Lincoln Cathedral some time in the 1250s. The treasurer was one of the four principal officers of the English cathedrals whose duty was to keep the treasures of the church – the gold and silver vessels, ornaments, relics, jewels, and altar cloths. He would have had a personal residence in the Cathedral close, would have employed a deputy and a large staff, and therefore could be absent as long as he performed those duties that could not be delegated. He probably died there in or before 1272.

He is mentioned by Roger Bacon, who had also been a Master at Paris, as among "the more famous wise men of Christendom" one of whom named is Albertus Magnus, another of whom is master William of Sherwood, "the treasurer of the church of Lincoln in England, who is much wiser than Albert".

== The Introduction to Logic ==
William's main work is a small logic manual titled Introductiones in Logicam. It survives in a single manuscript probably written in the late thirteenth century, headed Introductiones Magistri Guilli de Shyreswode in Logicam. It did not appear fully in print until 1937, in Grabman's Latin edition, and was not translated into English until 1966, by Norman Kretzmann. No other works that are definitely by him have ever been printed.

The book consists of six chapters; five of these are expositions of Aristotle's main logical works, as follows:

Chapter	Chapter title	Corresponding work by Aristotle
1	Statements	De Interpretatione
2	The Predicables	Categories
3	Syllogism	Prior Analytics
4	Dialectical Reasoning	Topics
5	Properties of Terms	—
6	Sophistical Reasoning	Sophistical Refutations

Chapter 5, "Properties of Terms", contains material that is not in Aristotle, but is a distinctively medieval development called Supposition theory, which deals with the semantics of statements. The theory attempts to explain how the truth of simple sentences, expressed schematically, depend on how the terms "supposit" or stand for certain extra-linguistic items, and tries to address the problem of sentential forms, like "I promise you a horse", which do not appear to fit the standard syllogistic forms.

In this chapter William introduces what was to become a standard division of supposition into material, formal, and personal. In material supposition, a term stands for itself, as when we say that "Socrates" is a name (note that medieval Latin did not use quotation marks as in modern English). In formal supposition, the word signifies its meaning, as in man is a species. Formal supposition is similar to what is indicated in modern philosophical logic by italicising a common noun, as when we refer to the concept horse. Personal supposition is approximately the relation we now call "satisfied by", or "denotes", as in the term "man" denotes Socrates, Aristotle, etc..

He discusses a number of problem cases. For example, the sentence "every man sees a man" is true when there is a single man that every man sees (for example if "every man sees Socrates" is true). But the sentence is also true when every man sees a different man, or when some men see a single man (such as Socrates), other men see another man, and innumerable cases in between. This is called confused supposition. This instance of the problem of multiple generality is now thought to be insoluble using the fixed schema of Aristotle's semantics.

William's work spurred a development of logic in the thirteenth century under the general designation De Proprietibus Terminorum. Those who engaged in this part of logic were called the Moderni, or Terministae. Its most detailed treatment is found in Ockham, and in the works of those who followed him.

== Legacy ==
Now, William is perhaps best known for a mnemonic poem to help students remember the names of the valid syllogistic forms:

BARBARA, CELARENT, DARII, FERIOque prioris;
CESARE, CAMESTRES, FESTINO, BAROCO secundae;
tertia DARAPTI, DISAMIS, DATISI, FELAPTON, BOCARDO, FERISON habet;
quarta insuper addit: BRAMANTIP, CAMENES, DIMARIS, FESAPO, FRESISON;

This verse might not have originated with him, but it is the oldest known surviving version. Peter of Spain later gives an account of the verses which is more detailed, and also one which lacks mistakes in William's version. According to Kretzmann, this strongly suggests their source is a single earlier version, now lost.

== Works ==
- Introductiones in logicam (Introduction to Logic), edited by Martin Grabmann, Munich: Verlag der Bayerischen Akademie der Wissenschaften, 1937
- William of Sherwood, Introductiones in logicam, Critical edition edited by Charles H. Lohr with P. Kunze and B. Mussler, Traditio 39, 1983: 219–99.
- William of Sherwood. Introductiones in logicam: Einfuhrung in die Logik, edited and translated in German by H. Brands and C. Kann Hamburg: Meiner, 1995 (this critical edition supersedes the two earlier editions).
- Syncategoremata (Treatise on Categorization Words), edited by R. O'Donnell, Medieval Studies, 3, 1941: 46–93.
- William of Sherwood. Syncategoremata, edited and translated in German by C. Kann and R. Kirchhoff. Hamburg: Meiner, 2012 (this critical edition supersedes the previous edition).
- Insolubilia (Insolubles), edited by Marie Louise Roure in 'La problématique des propositions insolubles du XIIIe siècle et du début du XIVe, suivie de l'édition des traités de William Shyreswood, Walter Burleigh et Thomas Bradwardine', Archives d'histoire doctrinale et littéraire du moyen Age 37, 1970: 205–326.

=== English translations ===
- William of Sherwood's Introduction to Logic, translated (from the edition of Grabmann) by Norman Kretzmann, Minneapolis, MN: University of Minnesota Press, 1966.
- Treatise on Syncategorematic Words, translated by Norman Kretzmann, Minneapolis, MN: University of Minnesota Press, 1968.
