= Bernard of Auvergne (disambiguation) =

Bernard of Auvergne (fl. 1303–1307) was a French Dominican theologian and bishop-elect of Clermont.

Bernard of Auvergne or Bernard d'Auvergne may also refer to:

- Bernard I of Auvergne, count of Auvergne from 846 to 868
- Bernard Plantapilosa, count of Auvergne (as Bernard II) from 872 to 886
- Bernard (bishop of Auvergne), bishop of Auvergne from 938 to 940
