= Walter Burley =

English scholastic philosopher (1270s–1340s)

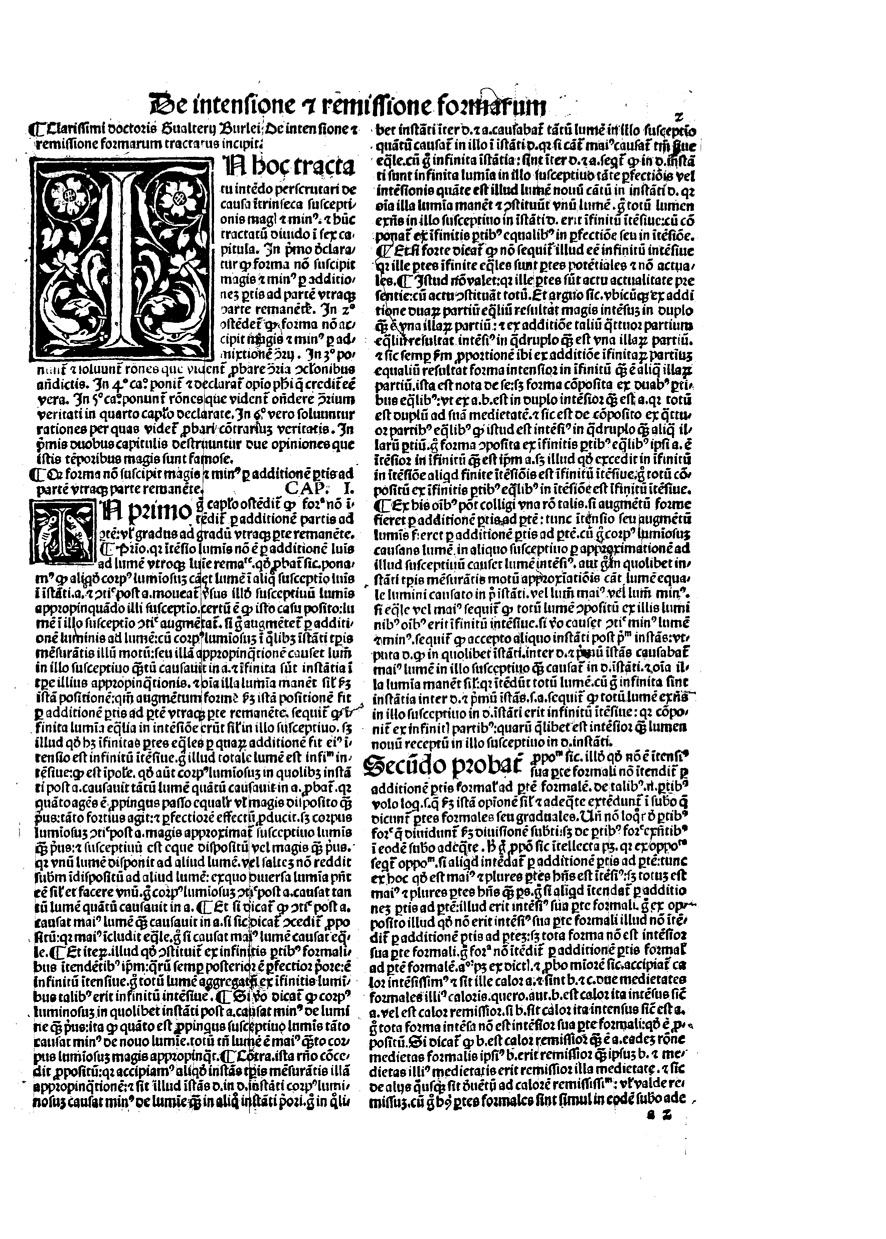
De intensione et remissione formarum, 1496

Walter Burley (or Burleigh; c. 1275 – 1344/45) was an English scholastic philosopher and logician with at least 50 works attributed to him. He studied under Thomas Wilton and received his Master of Arts degree in 1301, and was a fellow of Merton College, Oxford until about 1310. He then spent sixteen years in Paris, becoming a fellow of the Sorbonne by 1324, before spending 17 years as a clerical courtier in England and Avignon. Burley disagreed with William of Ockham on a number of points concerning logic and natural philosophy. He was known as the Doctor Planus et Perspicuus.

== Early life ==
Burley was born in 1274 or 1275, possibly in Burley-in-Wharfedale, Yorkshire, or in Burley near Leeds. Little is known of his early life. He was made rector of Welbury in Yorkshire in 1309, probably through the influence of Sir John de Lisle, a friend of William Greenfield. As throughout his career, he did not act as rector, employing a substitute and using the income from the living to finance his study in Paris, where he completed his lectures on Peter Lombard's Sentences, and probably encountered the work of his contemporary William of Ockham. Burley's commentary on the Sentences has not survived.

== Political career ==
Burley became a courtier during the political events that followed the deposition of Edward II of England in 1327. His first assignment was to try and obtain the canonisation of Thomas, 2nd Earl of Lancaster, who had been one of the leaders of the baronial opposition to Edward II; Thomas had become venerated as a martyr within a few months of his death. Burley was sent to the papal court at Avignon to appeal directly to Pope John XXII. By coincidence, William of Ockham was also staying at Avignon, having been summoned there in 1324 to answer charges of possibly heretical statements (by 1326 there was a list of 51 charges against him).

Burley's associates were all closely involved in these attempts at canonisation (none of which was successful). One was Richard de Bury, a bibliophile and patron of the arts and sciences, who became Burley's patron and at whose request Bury translated some works of Aristotle into English.

== Philosophical work ==
Burley was one of the first medieval logicians to recognize the priority of the propositional calculus over the term logic, despite the fact that the latter had been the main focus of logicians until then. Burley also seems to have been the only 14th-century logician to have taken the position that, in line with modern views on the material conditional, the principle that "from the impossible anything follows" ("ex impossibili sequitur quodlibet") is both a necessary and sufficient condition for explaining the logical relationship between antecedent and consequent. He was also known for his commentaries on Aristotle's Physics, which include the quodlibet De Primo et ultimo instanti (around 1320) and the longer work Expositio in libros octo de physico auditu. Burley wrote 39 Commentaries on Aristotle and 32 Treatises and Questions (many unedited).

- De Puritate Artis Logicae, in two versions:
  - Tractatus brevior (before 1324)
  - Tractatus longior (1325–28)

This is Burley's main work, in which he covers such topics as the truth conditions for complex sentences, both truth-functional and modal, as well as providing rules of inferences for different types of inferences. This book is known to have been written after Ockham's Summa Logicae (c. 1323), possibly partly in response to it. Other works include: (Note: The Liber de vita et moribus philosophorum, once attributed to Burley, is by an anonymous author.)

- In Aristotelis Perihermenias (Questions on Aristotle's Perihermenias, 1301)
- De consequentiis (1302)
- De exclusivis (1302)
- De exceptivis (1302)
- De suppositionibus (1302)
- De obligationibus (1302)
- De ente (ca. 1310)
- De qualitatibus (ca. 1310)
- Expositio super libros De Anima (after 1310)
- Tractatus de formis (1324–1326)
- Tractatus de universalibus (after 1337)

== Bibliography ==
- De intensione et remissione formarum (in Latin). Venetijs: Ottaviano Scoto. 1496.
- De Puritate Artis Logicae Tractatus Longior, with a revised edition of the Tractatus Brevior, ed. P. Boehner, New York: 1955.
- On the Purity of the Art of Logic. The Shorter and Longer Treatises, trans. & ed. P.V. Spade, New Haven & London: Yale University Press, 2000.
- De Formis, ed. Frederick J. Down Scott, Munich: Verlag der Bayerischen Akademie der Wissenschaften, 1970 ISBN 3-7696-9004-4.
- Quaestiones super librum Posteriorum, ed. Mary Catherine Sommers, Toronto: Pontifical Institute of Mediaeval Studies, 2000.
- Questions on the De anima of Aristotle, by Adam Burley and Walter Burley, ed. Edward A. Synan, Leiden & New York: Brill, 1997.
- In physicam Aristotelis expositio et quaestiones, Hildesheim & New York: Georg Olms, 1972.
- Super artem veterem, [Porphyry and Aristotle], Venice, 1497 (anastatic reprint): Frankfurt a/M.: Minerva, 1967.
- Robert Grosseteste, In Aristotelis Posteriorum analyticorum libros, Walter Burleigh, Super libros Posteriorum analyticorum Aristotelis, Venice, 1514 (anastatic reprint): Frankfurt a/M.: Minerva, 1966.
- Commentarium in Aristotelis De Anima L.III, Manuscripts facsimiles: MS. Vaticano lat. 2151, f.1-88 , MS. Lambeth 143, f.76-138 , MS. Lambeth 74, f.33-109 , MS. Oxford Balliol College 92, f.9-200 , interactive paleography transcription by Mario Tonelotto, 2014.

== Sources ==
- Böhner, Philotheus (1952). Medieval Logic: An Outline of Its Development from 1250 to C. 1400. Manchester University Press.
- Broadie, Alexander. Introduction to Medieval Logic (Oxford: Clarendon Press, 2nd Edition 1993).
- Conti, Alessandro (ed.). A Companion to Walter Burley, Late Medieval Logician and Metaphysician, Leiden: Brill 2013.
- Gracia, J. G. and Noone, T. B. A Companion to Philosophy in the Middle Ages, London 2003.
- Jacobi, Klaus, ed. (1993). Argumentationstheorie: Scholastische Forschungen Zu Den Logischen Und Semantischen Regeln Korrekten Folgerns. BRILL. ISBN 978-90-04-09822-0.
- Ottman, J.; Wood, R. (1999). "Walter of Burley – his Life and Works". Vivarium: An International Journal for the Philosophy and Intellectual Life of the Middle Ages and Renaissance. Vol. 37. Brill.
