= John of Mirecourt =

14th-century Cistercian philosopher

John of Mirecourt, also known as Monachus Albus ('the White Monk'), was a Cistercian scholastic philosopher of the fourteenth century, from Mirecourt, Lorraine. He was a follower of William of Ockham; he was censured by Pope Clement VI.

== Biography ==
Very little is known of the life of John of Mirecourt, but it seems that he was born at Mirecourt in Lorraine between 1310 and 1315. He lectured at the Cistercian College of St. Bernard in Paris, and rose to the height of his philosophical and theological fame around the year 1345. He is credited with writing a commentary on Peter Lombard's Sentences, and two subsequent apologies which were responses to various criticisms of his commentary. He wrote two versions of his commentary; the first of which was attacked by a Benedictine called Johannes Normanus. Mirecourt replied by issuing a Declaratio in which he explained the meanings behind his propositions. Nevertheless, acting upon the recommendation of the faculty of theology at the University of Paris, Robert of Bardis, the University chancellor, condemned 41 propositions that were drawn from Mirecourt's writings on the Sentences. Mirecourt responded to this condemnation by writing a second apology to no avail: he was censured in Paris by Pope Clement VI in 1347. After this censure, nothing further is known of him, including any approximation as to the date of his death. There is some speculation that scholarly jealousy and academic politics made up a portion of the motivation behind Mirecourt's censure; and as Mirecourt was not radical in all of his philosophical views, it is not unsubstantiated that his censure was in part the result of some ill-will from various of the nominalist factions.

== Philosophical thought ==
=== Knowledge and Intuition ===
Mirecourt reasoned that there are two kinds of certain knowledge: (1) 'the principle of non-contradiction,' and (2) 'the immediate intuition of one's existence'. The most undoubtedly of all things that can be known fall to this first kind of knowledge, as well as all analytic judgements that are reducible to it. Mirecourt distinguishes between two kinds of evidence of these kinds of knowledge: (1) special and (2) natural. Special evidence comes from the principle of non-contradiction, and natural evidence is that which is gained empirically. Mirecourt thought natural evidence to be weaker than special evidence because he understood God to be both absolutely powerful and the producer of miracles (as taken to be some occurrence outside of what is otherwise empirically observable).

It is speculated that Mirecourt was censured due to his rigid views regarding the reliance of everything upon the will of God. Mirecourt held the view that anything physical or moral is wholly depended on the entirely free will of God. This was a controversial view because it held God responsible for willing not only all that is good, but also all that is not good. This stood in rather severe contradistinction to the commonly accepted view of Mirecourt's contemporaries which were centered on the premise of an all-good God. Mirecourt stated that some temptations cannot be overcome without a miracle from God. Such temptations included resisting the urge to have sexual relations with another man's wife. If this miracle is not given, Mirecourt argued that the action is then to be called neither adultery, nor a sin.

Mirecourt is most well known for his theories on the infinite. He was chiefly concerned with species and perfections. God possessed the highest degree of perfection on his scale; and all creatures were infinitely distant from him. Mirecourt held that it is impossible to measure perfections because of the infinite distance they have from God. Thus, all that can be known is that any species either exceeds, or is exceeded by, some other species in a scale of perfections.

=== Nominalism ===
Mirecourt is generally thought to be a nominalist, and is often thought of as being a follower of William Ockham. Mirecourt rejected the idea of an imperfect intuitive cognition, however, which is a considerable departure from Ockham. The two, though, are generally in accord, especially with respect to their epistemological views.

=== Epistemology ===
Both Mirecourt and Ockham describe abstractive and intuitive cognition in very similar ways: both men think of knowledge as starting with intuitive cognition. Both men also distinguish between judgement and simple apprehension. In addition, both assert a need for close connections between a cognition and its object.

=== Influences ===
Mirecourt was chiefly influenced by the philosophy of Nicholas of Autrecourt, William Ockham, and to a minimal degree, Gregory of Rimini, and perhaps even Thomas Bradwardine. Nearly all of the major figures of Mirecourt's day accepted the basic tenets of nominalism, to some degree, and Mirecourt was no different in this respect. He was particularly influenced by the radical nominalist views of Nicholaus of Autrecourt, who was forced to burn his writings in 1347.
