= John Capreolus =

French Dominican theologian (c.1380–1444)

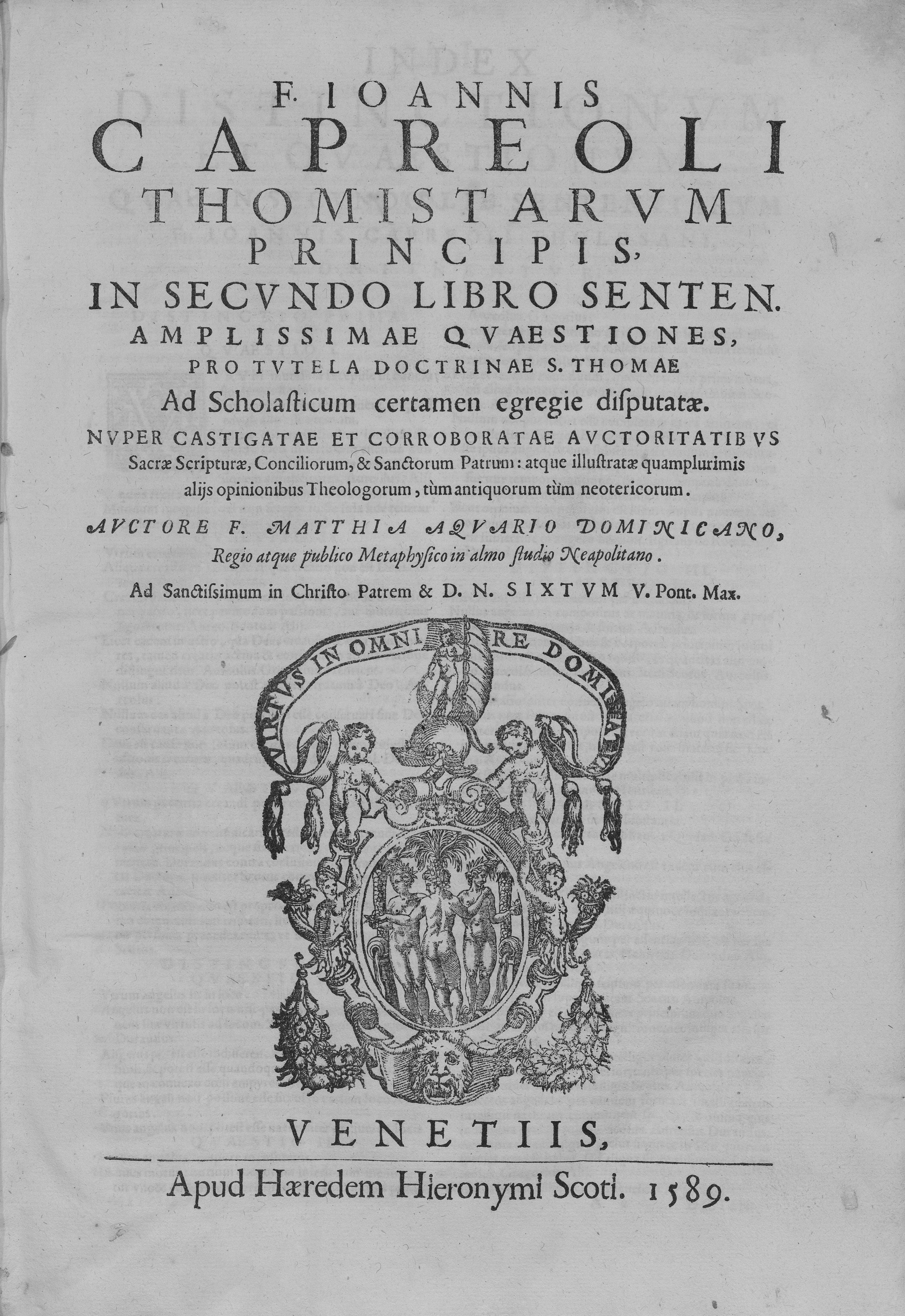
In libros sententiarum amplissimae quaestiones, 1589

John Capreolus, in French Jean Capréolus and in Latin Johannes Capreolus (c. 1380 – 6 April 1444), was a French Dominican theologian and Thomist.

He is sometimes known as the Prince of the Thomists. His Four Books of Defenses of the Theology of St. Thomas Aquinas can be said to have sparked a revival in Thomism.

== Life ==
Only scant details of his personal history are known. He was born and died in the diocese of Rodez. He was a Dominican affiliated with the province of Toulouse, and a general chapter of his order at Poitiers in 1407 assigned him to lecture on The Sentences at the University of Paris. He began in 1408 and achieved success.

The following year he finished the first part of his defensive commentary on the theology of Thomas Aquinas. He passed examinations for degrees at the Sorbonne in 1411 and in 1415. After serving for some time as regent of studies at Toulouse, he repaired to Rodez where he laboured at his commentaries completing the three remaining parts in 1426, 1428 and 1433.

== Works ==
In the preface of a compendium of Capreolus's work by Isidoro Isolani, it is stated that these manuscripts once narrowly escaped destruction by fire, a lay brother having saved them, to the joy of the author, who was then advanced in years. The same authority describes Capreolus as having a devotion to the Blessed Virgin.

Capreolus's Scholastic writings defend Aquinas against critics including Scotus, Henry of Ghent, John of Ripa, Guido the Carmelite, Aureolus, Durandus, Gregory of Rimini, William of Ockham, and other Nominalists. He has been called the "Soul of St. Thomas" for his scrupulous adherence to Aquinas; his writings also heavily cite Aristotle and Averroes.

The commentaries, bearing slightly variant titles, were published in four folio volumes at Venice, 1483, 1514, 1519, 1589. In 1881, Bishop Joseph-Christian-Ernest Bourret of Rodez, who had made the life and works of Capreolus, the object of considerable research, suggested a critically revised edition of the commentaries, which was at length undertaken by the Dominicans. Its publication was begun at Tours in 1900 under the title: Johannis Capreoli Tholosani, Ordinis Praedicatorum, Thomistarum principis, Defensiones Theologiae Divi Thomae Aq.de novo editae cura et studio RR. PP. Ceslai Paban et Thomae Pegues. Early compendiums of the work by Paul Soncinas and by Sylvester Prierias were much used in their day.
