= Richard of Campsall =

Richard of Campsall (Ricardus de Campsalle) (c.1280-c.1350) was an English theologian and scholastic philosopher, at the University of Oxford. He was a Fellow of Balliol College and then of Merton College. He is now considered a possible precursor to the views usually associated with William of Ockham.

He commented on Aristotle's Prior Analytics, with emphasis on "conversion" and "consequences". He is an apparent innovator in speculation about God's foreknowledge, particularly concerning future contingents, around 1317.
