= Ernest Addison Moody =

American philosopher

Ernest Addison Moody (1903–1975) was a noted philosopher, medievalist, and logician as well as a musician and scientist. He served as professor of philosophy at University of California, Los Angeles (UCLA), where he also served as department chair, and Columbia University. He has an annual memorial conference in his name on the subject of medieval philosophy. He was president of the American Philosophical Association from 1963 to 1964.

His father was John Moody, founder of the US credit rating agency Moody's Investors Service.

== Education and honors ==
- Williams College, B.A. (1924).
- Columbia University, M.A., Philosophy (1933), Ph.D., Philosophy (1936).
- 1956 Recipient of Columbia's Nicholas Murray Butler Silver Medal, cited as "a leading scholar, writer and teacher whose many original contributions to the field of medieval philosophy and science have won international recognition." New York Times, June 1, 1959 at page 21.
- 1956 Recipient of Haskins Medal of the Medieval Academy of America.
- 1963–1964 President of the American Philosophical Association

== Books ==
- 1976 Truth and consequence in mediaeval logic.
- 1975 Studies in medieval philosophy, science, and logic: collected papers, 1933-1969.
- 1965 Gulielmi Ockham (William of Ockham, ca. 1285-ca. 1349.) Expositionis in libros artis logicae prooemium; et, Expositio in librum Porphyril De praedicabilibus. (ed. Ernest A. Moody.)
- 1965 The Logic of William of Ockham.
- 1964 "Nicolaus of Autrecourt's Critique of Causality and Substance", trans. Ernest A. Moody, in Herman Shapiro, ed., Medieval Philosophy: Readings from Augustine to Buridan, New York: Modern Library.
- 1952 Medieval science of weights, scientia de ponderibus. Treatises ascribed to Euclid, Archimedes, Thabit ibn Qurra, Jordanus de Nemore and Blasius of Parma (ed. with introductions, English translations and notes by Ernest A. Moody and Marshall Clagett).
- 1953Truth and consequence in mediaeval logic.
- 1942 Iohannis Buridani (Jean Buridan), Quaestiones super libris quattuor de caelo et mundo (edited by Ernest Addison Moody).
- 1935 The Logic of William of Ockham.

== See also ==
- American philosophy
- List of American philosophers

== Manuscripts ==
- Selections from the SUMMA LOGICA of ALBERTUS DE SAXONIA available in PDF Format.
- Albert of Saxony wrote a treatise on logic. Ernest A. Moody produced a translation of selections from the first three parts of this work for the use of his students. Copies of this translation were widely circulated in manuscript form.
