= John of Reading =

English philosopher

- Born: c. 1272
- Died: 1346; Avignon, France
- Other names: Latin: Johannes de Reading, Johannes Radingia, Ioannes Radingiensis
- Occupation: Cleric

John of Reading (Latin: Johannes de Reading, Johannes Radingia, Ioannes Radingiensis; c. 1272 – 1346) was an English Franciscan theologian and scholastic philosopher. He was an early opponent of William of Ockham, and a follower of Duns Scotus.

== Career ==
John of Reading was ordained subdeacon at Northampton on September 20, 1292. He was made deacon at Dunstable in 1294.

He earned his doctorate of theology at University of Oxford by 1321. Around 1320 while he was at Oxford, he wrote a commentary on the Sentences. He argued for the unity of science.

In 1322 he moved to a teaching position at Avignon, then the seat of the Avignon Papacy. (Note: In modern times a commune in the Vaucluse department in southeastern France. Jorge J. E. Gracia, Timothy B. Noone, A Companion to Philosophy in the Middle Ages (2003), p. 390.) Reading is buried at Avignon.

== Bibliography ==
- Katherine H. Tachau, Optics, Epistemology and the Foundations of Semantics, 1250-1345 (1988) pp. 165–179
