= Isidoro Isolani =

Italian Dominican theologian (c. 1480–1528)

Isidoro Isolani (c. 1480 – 1528) was an Italian Dominican theologian, lecturer and writer. He was a pioneer in Josephology and an early critic of Martin Luther. In the Italian Wars, he supported the French.

== Life ==
Isolani was born around 1480, likely in Milan. Towards 1500 he joined the Dominicans of Santa Maria delle Grazie, where he later served as prior from 1526 to 1528. There he received a theological and philosophical education based on Peter Lombard's Sentences and Thomas Aquinas' Summa contra gentiles. In 1509–1510, he took part in the reform of the convent of Sant'Eustorgio. In 1513, he was a lecturer at Sant'Apollinare in Pavia. In 1514, he was at the oratory of Saint Joseph in Fontanellato. From 1516 to 1518, he was back in Milan. There he was attached to the circle around the mystic Arcangela Panigarola. In 1519, he was lecturing at the Dominican studium in Cremona.

In the war of 1521–1526 over the Duchy of Milan, Isolani favoured France. In 1521, he was lecturing at Sant'Apollinare. In 1522–1523, he read the Sentences at the Dominican studium in Bologna and became a Bachelor of Theology. He may have served for a time as regent of the studium. The date of his death is unknown, but Philip Schaff places it between 22 April and 9 July 1528.

== Works ==
Isolani wrote extensively in Latin. He began writing his most famous and influential work, Summa de donis sancti Ioseph, in March 1514. Completed in November 1521 and dedicated to Pope Adrian VI, it was printed at Pavia by G. Pocatela in 1522. It is "the first scholastically argued theological text devoted solely to [Saint] Joseph's godly qualities and powers as intercessor".

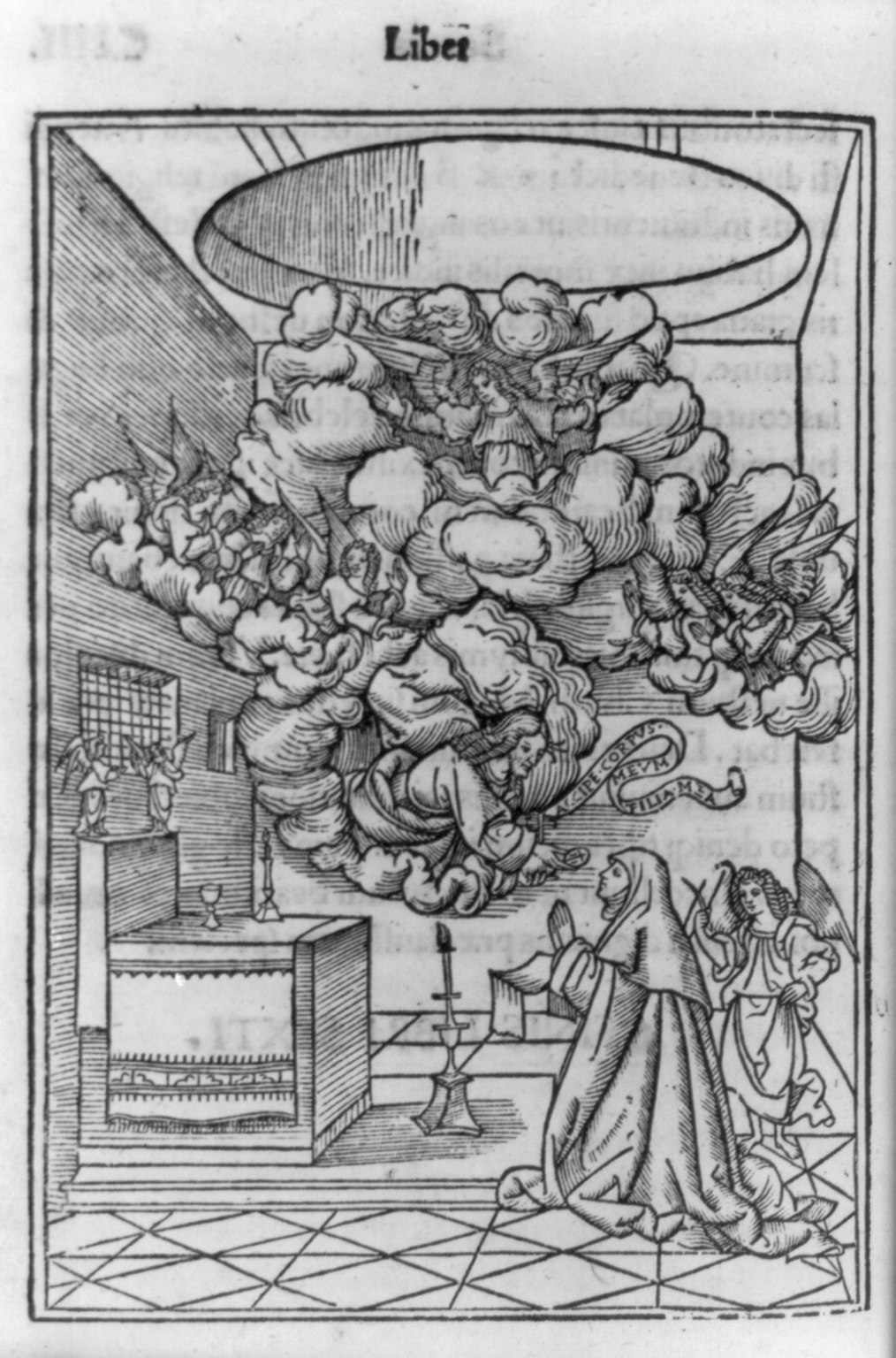
An illustration from Isolani's biography of Veronica da Binasco

In 1518, Isolani published Inexplicabilis mysterii gesta Beatae Veronicae, a biography of Veronica da Binasco, Panigarola's mystic predecessor. It was dedicated to King Francis I of France and Queen Claude.

In November 1519 at Cremona, Isolani published anonymously a treatise against Martin Luther, entitled Revocatio Martini Lutherii Augustiniani ad Sanctam Sedem. It was the first response to Luther written by an Italian on his private initiative and without official sanction. It is divided into ten persuasiones inviting Luther to repentance. Isolani claimed authorship of the Revocatio in a later publication against Luther, the Disputationes, first printed at Pavia in 1522 and again at Lyon in 1528. It was dedicated to García de Loaysa. In it, Isolani mounts a defence of the practice of indulgences.

Isolani took up the project of Paolo da Soncino, an epitome of John Capreolus's commentary on the Sentences, and completed it in 1521. It was published at Pavia by G. Pocatela in 1522 under the title Divinum epitoma quaestionum in IV libros sententiarum a principe Thomistarum Ioanne Capreolo O.P. disputatarum and dedicated to Francis I.

Isolani's other works include:

- De immortalitate animi humani (Milan: G. A. Scinzenzeler, 1505)
- Libellus adversus magos (Milan: G. A. Scinzenzeler, 1506)
- Explanatio immortalitatis humani animi secundum phylosophos (Milan: Gottardo Da Ponte, 1509)
- Opus de veritate conceptionis Immaculatae Virginis Matris Dei Mariae ex doctrina Ioannis Scoti ac divi Bonaventurae (Milan: 1510), an analysis of the papal bull Grave nimis (1483) of Sixtus IV, which declared the Immaculate Conception a dogma
- In Averroistas de aeternitate mundi libri quatuor (Pavia: G. Pocatela, 1513)
- De velocitate omnium motuum fr. Alberti de Saxonia (Pavia: 1513)
- De imperio militantis Ecclesiae (Milan: Gottardo Da Ponte, 1517), his theological magnum opus, dedicated to Denis Briçonnet
- De patriae urbis laudibus panegyricus (Milan: 1519), a speech delivered before the city leaders on 11 March 1518 on behalf of the Dominican general chapter
- Expositio psalmi LXXVII (Bologna: 1523)
- Tractatus de futura nova mundi mutatione (Bologna: G. Benedetti, 1523), his last publication
