= William Curti =

Cardinal William Curti was an official of the Catholic Church who was involved in religious and academic censure at the University of Paris, in the late 14th century. He is best remembered as the cardinal who presided at the trial of Nicholas of Autrecourt. The trial concerned the suspect views of Nicholas of Autrecourt pertaining to the immortality of the soul.

The positive philosophy of Nicholas of Autrecourt conflicted with some points of Catholic theology. The report of the inquiry is most often referred to as The Articles of Cardinal Curti. On 19 May 1346, Nicholas of Autrecourt was sentenced to burn his writings in Paris, France.
