= Petrus Ferrandi Hispanus =

Medieval Spanish scholar

Petrus Ferrandi Hispanus OP
- Born: Pedro Ferrando
- Died: c. 1255; Zamora
- Occupations: Dominican friar; hagiographer; teacher
- Known for: Legenda sancti Dominici

Petrus Ferrandi Hispanus (also Peter Ferrand or Peter of Spain; Spanish: Pedro Ferrando; died before 1259) was a Spanish Dominican friar who wrote the Legenda sancti Dominici, a biography (legenda prima) of Saint Dominic of Osma, and possibly also wrote the liturgy of the saint's feast.

== Biography ==
Peter probably died in 1254. He was certainly dead by 1259. His obituary, written by his friend and fellow Dominican Giles of Portugal was contained in the Vitae fratrum (Lives of the Brothers) compiled by Gerald de Frachet in 1258 or 1259. The obituary indicates that Giles was present when Peter died in Zamora:

When a brother, Peter Ferrandi, who from childhood was brought up in the order of the most holy and learned man [Dominic], and who wrote a life of the blessed Dominic our father, [and was] a teacher in many areas [and many fields in Spain], finally fell ill at Zamora, this devoted brother saw Him standing on a most high mountain, his face resplendent as the sun, and at his right hand and at his left the two young men standing resplendent also. When, however, the next day he told me that he had seen this vision, I understood that the brother Peter in the near future would die.

Humbert of Romans added the text "in Spain" later to clarify that Peter did not teach outside Spain. Writing towards 1304, Bernard Gui clarified further that Peter Ferrandi was from Galicia (Hyspanus natione de Galexia). The Regensburg Lectionary further indicates that the Dominican general chapter later approved Peter's Legenda and his liturgy before 1300. Peter's Legenda seems to have superseded the Libellus, a short biography of Dominic by Jordan of Saxony, around 1235 before being itself substantially revised by Constantine of Orvieto in the late 1240s.

In the early fifteenth century Friar Luis de Valladolid identified the author of the Legenda with the logician Peter of Spain, an identification which some modern scholars have accepted. Others reject the connection between the friar and the logician.
