= Bartholomaeus Arnoldi =

Augustinian friar who taught Martin Luther

Bartholomaeus Arnoldi (usually called Usingen; German: Bartholomäus Arnoldi von Usingen; 1465 – 9 September 1532) was an Augustinian friar and doctor of divinity who taught Martin Luther and later turned into his earliest and one of his personally closest opponents.

== Life ==
Usually called Usingen, after his birthplace, Arnoldi received his master's degree in 1491 and was promoted to the doctorate of divinity in 1514. For thirty years he filled the chairs of philosophy and theology at Erfurt University, and, with Jodocus Trutfetter, was its leading teacher. He enjoyed the favour of the younger humanists.

A dialectician and logician, Arnoldi was Luther's teacher in both these branches. Luther retained an affectionate regard for him and after the Heidelberg Disputation (May 1518) travelled in his company from Würzburg to Erfurt, during which he made efforts to wean him from his ecclesiastical allegiance. In 1521, during the uprising against the priesthood and the pillaging of their property, he denounced the rioters from the pulpit. In 1522 he delivered a series of sermons in the cathedral in defence of Catholicism, arraigning the inactivity of the civil and ecclesiastical authorities, and predicted the revolution which came in the German Peasants' War. A first controversial treatise (1522) was directed against the preaching of Johannes Cuelsamer and Aegidius Mechler; it was followed by many more.

His anti-Reformation attitude and utterances in the end embittered Luther, who attacked his old teacher. He moved to Würzburg, in 1526, and in 1530 accompanied Conrad von Thüngen, the Bishop of Würzburg, to the Diet of Augsburg. Returning, he died at Würzburg, on 9 September 1532.

== See also ==
- Gabriel Biel
- Johann Eck
- William of Ockham
