= Paolo Barbò da Soncino =

Italian Dominican philosopher and theologian

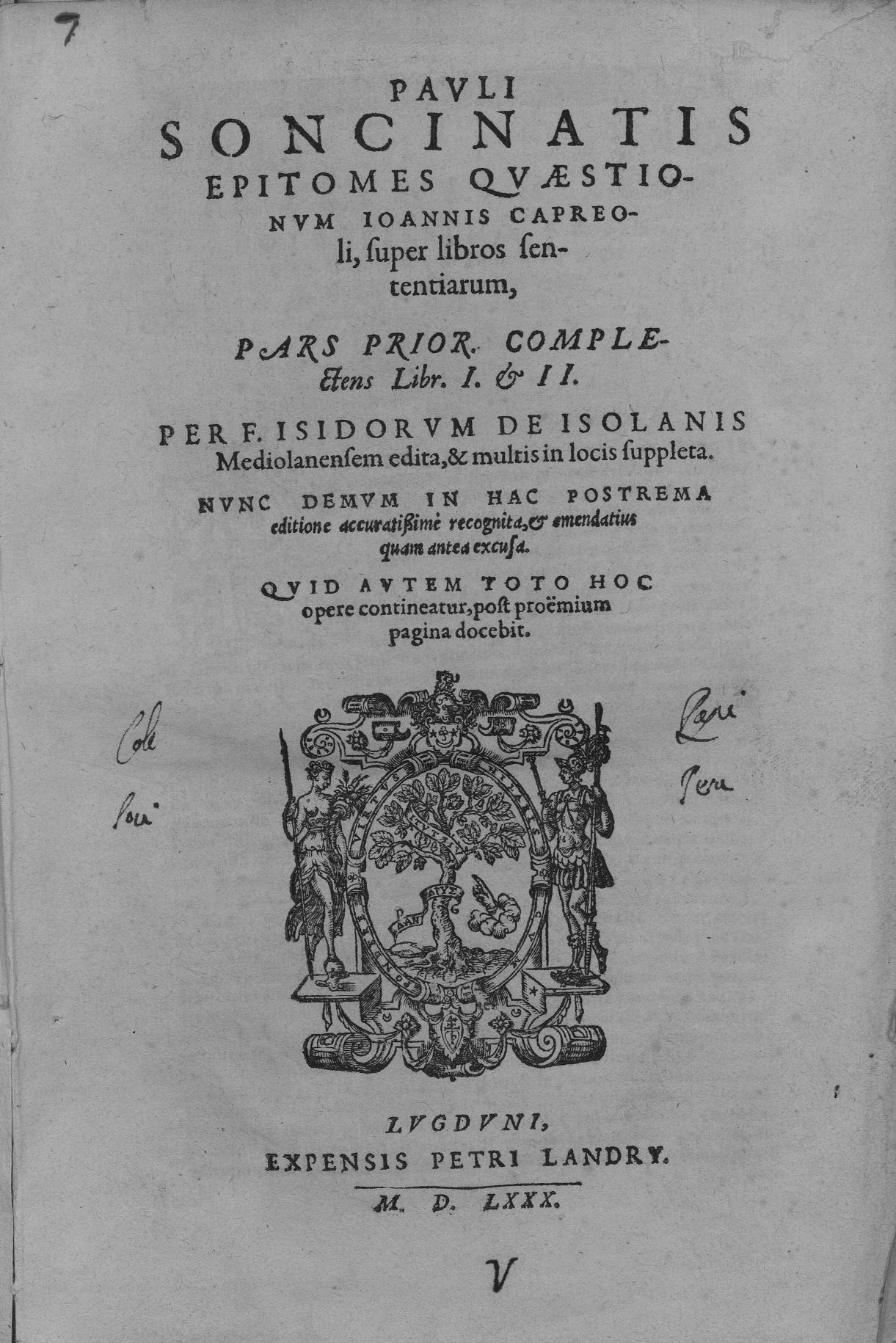
Divinum Epitoma quaestionum in IV libros senentiarum

Paolo Barbò da Soncino (died 5 August 1494/5) was an Italian Dominican philosopher and theologian.

== Life ==
Barbò was born at Soncino, Lombardy, from where comes the name of Paulus Soncinas which appears at the head of his books. When still very young he entered the Dominican Order and made his philosophical and theological studies in its schools. He afterwards taught philosophy and theology at Milan, Ferrara, and Bologna.

Barbò died at Cremona on 5 August 1494 or 1495.

== Works ==
Barbò was esteemed by contemporary scholars, and notably by Giovanni Pico della Mirandola. Many of his writings were lost at an early date.

The following have been printed frequently:

- "Quaestiones super divina sapientia Aristotelis" (principal edition, Lyons, 1579);
- "Divinum Epitoma quaestionum in IV libros senentiarum a principe Thomistarum Joanne Capreolo Tolesano disputatarum" (principal edition, Pavia, 1522), an epitome of John Capreolus' commentary on the Sentences, completed after Barbò's death by Isidoro Isolani
- The place and date of "In libros praedicabilium et praedicamentorum expositio" are unknown.
