= William of Lucca =

William of Lucca (Guglielmo da Lucca) (died 1178 AD) was an Italian theologian and scholastic philosopher. He taught at Bologna, in the third quarter of the twelfth century.

He wrote a commentary on The Divine Names of Pseudo-Dionysius, combining ideas from Gilbert de la Porrée with those of Eriugena. He is also the presumed author of Summa artis dialectice, a textbook of logic, influenced by Abelard.

== See also ==
- List of scholastic philosophers
