= Ælfheah =

Ælfheah is a given name. Notable people with the name include:

- Ælfheah of Canterbury (died 1012), martyred Saint and Archbishop of Canterbury
- Ælfheah the Bald (died 951), Saint, and the first Bishop of Winchester
- Alphege of Wells (died c. 937), third Bishop of Wells
- Elphege of Lichfield (died 1012–1014), Anglo-Saxon Bishop of Lichfield
- Ælfheah, Ealdorman of Hampshire (died 983), brother of Ælfhere, Ealdorman of Mercia
