= Walter Chatton =

Walter Chatton (c. 1290–1343) was an English Scholastic theologian and philosopher who regularly sparred philosophically with William of Ockham, who is well known for Occam's razor.

Chatton proposed an "anti-razor". From his Lectura I d. 3, q. 1, a. 1:

Whenever an affirmative proposition is apt to be verified for actually existing things, if two things, howsoever they are present according to arrangement and duration, cannot suffice for the verification of the proposition while another thing is lacking, then one must posit that other thing.

In basic terms, he was arguing against Ockham's razor by stating that if an explanation does not satisfactorily determine the truth of a proposition, and you are sure that the explanation so far is true, some other explanation must be required.
