= Richard Ferrybridge =

English Scholastic logician

Richard Ferrybridge was an English Scholastic logician of the fourteenth century.

His works include a Tractatus de veritate sive logica, and the Consequentiae. He is alluded to in The Anatomy of Melancholy.
