= Ardengus =

13th-century Florentine bishop

Ardengus was a bishop of Florence, beginning in 1231. While he was bishop, he introduced reforms and excommunicated the Patarini. He was a canon of Pavia. Before that, he was a teacher in Paris, to ca. 1227–1229.

== Works ==
- Abbrevatio summae magistri Guillelmi Autissiodorensis Unedited, for MSS see Landgraf, Introduction, p. 174

== Bibliography ==
- Artur Michael Landgraf, Introduction à l'histoire de la littérature théologique de la scolastique naissante Edited by Albert-M. Landry, translated by Louis-B. Geyer. Université de Montréal, Publications de l'Institut d'Études médiévales, vol. 22. Montreal and Paris, 1973.
- U. Betti, "Il Maestro Ardengo, vescovo di Firenze," Divinitas 9 (1965): 161-70
- F. Stegmüller, "Ardingus," LThK 1 (1957): 829
- Glorieux, Répertoire, 1: 284–5, n. 120
- Johannes Baptist Schneyer, Repertorium der lateinischen Sermones des Mittelalters. 11 volumes. (Beiträge zur Geschichte der Philosophie und Theologie des Mittelalters, 43/1-11.) Aschendorff: Münster, 1969–1990
