= André Evrard =

Swiss painter (1936–2021)

- Born: 1 April 1936; La Chaux-de-Fonds, Switzerland
- Died: 29 April 2021 (aged 85)
- Education: École d’art de La Chaux-de-Fonds
- Occupation: Painter

Signature
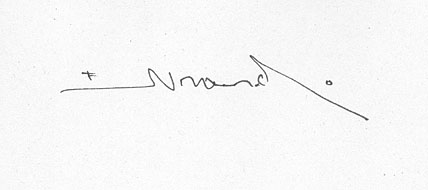

André Evrard (1 April 1936 – 29 April 2021) was a Swiss painter and engraver.

== Biography ==
Evrard studied at the École d’art de La Chaux-de-Fonds. In 1959, he moved to Vevey, where he would spend the entirety of his career.

André Evrard died on 29 April 2021 at the age of 85.

== Museum collections ==
- Aargauer Kunsthaus
- Cabinet des estampes de Bâle
- Swiss National Library
- Collection of the City of Biel/Bienne
- Convento del Bigorio
- Conservatory of Music Neuchâtelois
- Musée d'art et d'histoire de Fribourg
- Collection of the City of Geneva
- Museum of Fine Arts Le Locle
- University of Neuchâtel
- Musée Jenisch
- Kunsthaus Zürich

== Exhibitions ==
- Musée des Beaux-Arts de La Chaux-de-Fonds (February 1956)
