= Jodocus Trutfetter =

German philosopher and theologian (1460–1519)

Jodocus Trutfetter (also Trutvetter; known also as Jodocus von Eisenach, Jodocus Isenacensis, Jodocus Isennachcensis, Justus Trautvetter, Jesse Trutvetter, Doctor Isennachensis, and Doktor Eisenach ) (1460 – 9 May 1519) was a philosopher and theologian at the University of Erfurt, in the late fifteenth and early sixteenth centuries. His main works include a textbook on logic, the Summule totius logice, and another on natural philosophy, the Summa in totam physicen. As a supporter of the via moderna, he stressed the need to take both ancient and modern authorities into account. With respect to the subjects of universals, categories, and psychology, his views were close to those of Jean Buridan. On the relationship between theology and philosophy he had a similar position to William of Ockham.

== Biography ==
Trutfetter was born in Eisenach in 1460. He enrolled at the University of Erfurt on October 18, 1476, and received the degree of Bachelor in 1478 and the degree of Master in 1478. His thinking was influenced by John Buridan. In 1493 he received the licentiate in theology, followed by Doctor of Theology on 14 October 1504.
