= Philotheus Boehner =

Franciscan medieval scholar

The Reverend Philotheus Boehner
- Fathers Iranaeus Herscher, Thomas Plassmann, and Philotheus Boehner
- Born: Heinrich Boehner; 17 February 1901; Lichtenau, Province of Westphalia, Prussia
- Died: 22 May 1955 (aged 54); St. Bonaventure, New York, U.S.
- Education: University of Münster
- Employer: St. Bonaventure University
- Known for: Medieval scholarship

Philotheus Boehner (German: [ˈbøːnɐ]; born Heinrich Boehner; 17 February 1901 – 22 May 1955) was a member of the Franciscan order known for medieval scholarship.

== Biography ==
Boehner was born Heinrich Boehner in Lichtenau, Westphalia. He entered the Franciscan Order in 1920, and was given the name Philotheus, the Latin form of the Greek Philotheos, ("friend of God"). In 1927 he was ordained as a priest, although he was so ill with tuberculosis he was not expected to live. While resting, he began his work as a medieval scholar by translating Étienne Gilson's work on Saint Bonaventura. He became a close friend of Gilson in the 1930s.

In the summer of 1940 Boehner moved to Saint Bonaventure College (now a university) where he lectured on Franciscan philosophy, and it was here that he began to build the Franciscan Institute into a center of international Franciscan scholarship.

== Works ==
As a result of his work and influence, a large output of scholarly publications were issued from the Franciscan Institute (more than thirty volumes from 1944–55, divided into five series—Philosophy, Theology, Texts, History, and Missiology).

Probably his most enduring work is the critical edition of William of Ockham's Opera omnia theologica et philosophica, which he produced with Professor Ernest Moody.

- The History of the Franciscan School, I. Alexander of Hales; II. John of Rupella - Saint Bonaventure; III. Duns Scotus; Pt. IV. William Ockham, St. Bonaventure, N.Y.: St. Bonaventure University, 1943-1946.
- Medieval Logic. An Outline of Its Development from 1250 to c.1400, Manchester: Manchester University Press, 1952.
- Collected Articles on Ockham, edited by E.M. Buytaert, St. Bonaventure, N.Y.: Franciscan Institute, 1958.
