= Gregory of Rimini =

Italian philosopher and theologian

Blessed Gregory of Rimini O.E.S.A
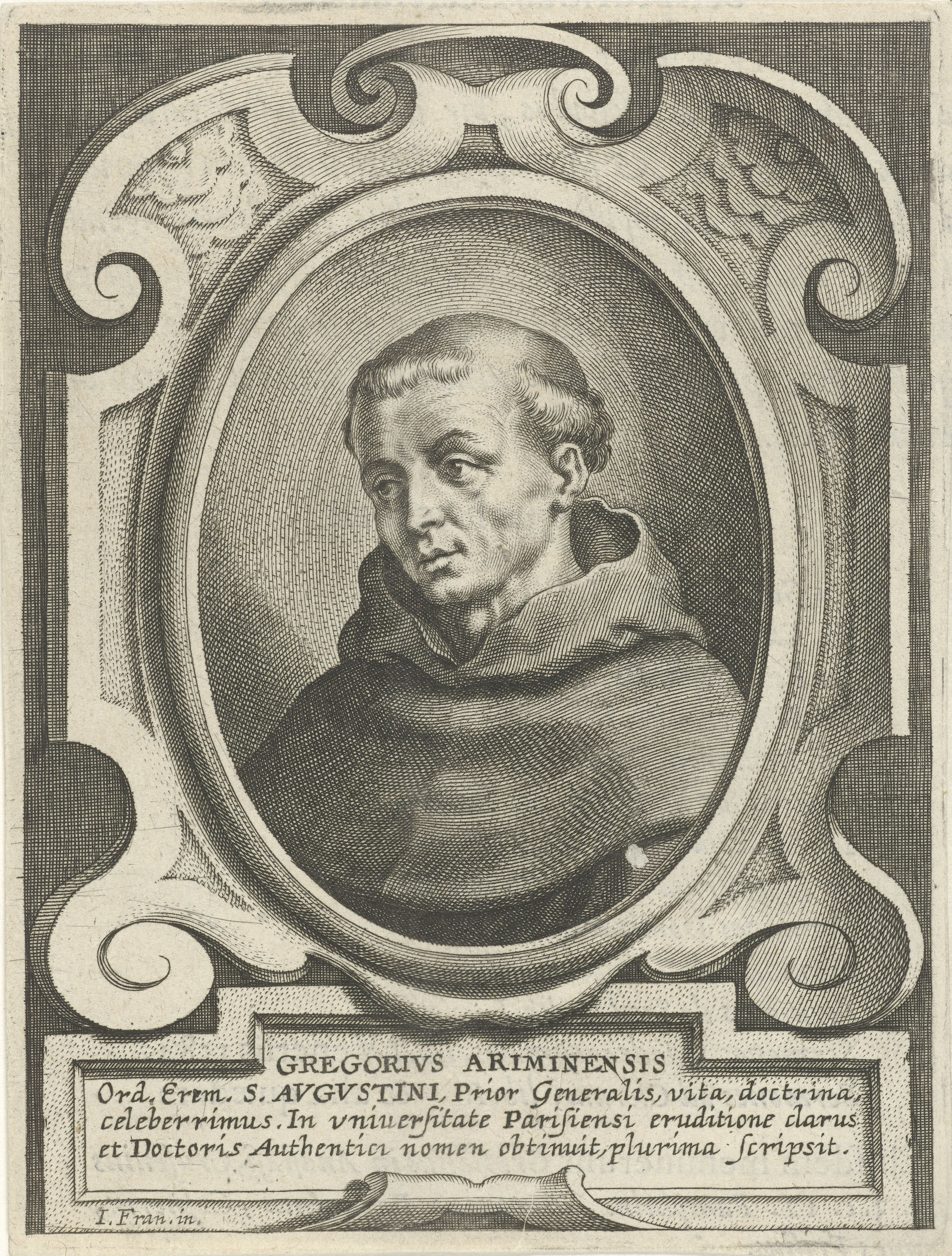
- Born: c. 1300; Rimini
- Died: 1358; Vienna, Duchy of Austria, Holy Roman Empire

Education
- Education: University of Paris

Philosophical work
- Era: Medieval philosophy
- Region: Western philosophy
- School: Scholasticism; Augustinianism
- Main interests: Theology, metaphysics, epistemology, economics

Gregory of Rimini, O.E.S.A. (Latin: Gregorius de Arimino or Ariminiensis; c. 1300 – November 1358) was an Italian Augustinian friar and one of the great scholastic philosophers and theologians of the Middle Ages. He was the first scholastic writer to unite the Oxonian and Parisian traditions in 14th-century philosophy, and his work had a lasting influence in the Late Middle Ages and Reformation. His scholastic nicknames were Doctor Acutus, Doctor Authenticus, and Doctor Subtilissimus.

== Life ==
Blessed Gregory was born in Rimini around 1300. He joined the Order of the Hermits of Saint Augustine before studying theology in the 1320s at the University of Paris, where he encountered the ideas of the late Franciscan Peter Auriol. In the 1330s he taught at Augustinian schools in Bologna, Padua and Perugia, where he became familiar with the recent work of Oxford thinkers such as Adam Wodeham, William Ockham, and Walter Chatton. He returned to Paris in 1342 to prepare his lectures on Peter Lombard's Sentences, which he delivered in 1342–1344. Because of his familiarity with English philosophy during this time, he effectively transmitted contemporary Oxford ideas—with an Augustinian tinge—to Paris. He became a Master of Theology in 1345 and subsequently taught at schools in Padua and Rimini.

In 1357, he was elected Prior General of the Order of the Hermits of Saint Augustine, and was known for his punishments for those who went against the Rule, and the spirit of religious life, by acquiring comforts for themselves. For example, he is recorded as having punished a certain number of religious for having used fine sheets and mattresses, and for neglecting to observe St. Martin’s Lent: B. Gregorius Ariminensis dum esset Ordinis Prior Generalis (electus an. 1357) inflixit poenam humi sedendi in publico refectorio per quindecim dies Prioribus vigintiquatuor quia non observarant sic dictam quadragesimam S. Martini in Ordinis constitutionibus part. 2, cap. X, n. 2, praescriptam; itemque privavit voce activa, et passiva, atque vestiario per unum annum aliquot Religiosos, qui sindones, et culcitram adhibuerant.

A year later, in 1358, he died in Vienna. His sepulchral inscription reads: Quisque ades, qui morte cares, sta perlege, plora. Sum quod eris, quod es ipse fui, pro me precor ora (“Whoever is present, you who lack death: stand, read, and cry. I am what you will be; what you are, I myself was; pray, I pray, for me.”) (Monasticon Augustinianum, 158). He seems to have been beatified by public acclamation, not having been formally declared beatus.

== Teachings ==
In his lifetime, Gregory composed a number of philosophical and theological works. His most important are his commentaries in books I and II of Peter Lombard’s Sentences.

Blessed Gregory was highly regarded among the Scholastics, especially those in the Augustinian Order. In all his writings, he strove to promote the doctrines of Saint Augustine, arguing against neo-pelagianism, which was gaining ground in his age.

=== Predestination and Original Sin ===
The most significant influence in Gregory's thought was St Augustine. Gregory studied Augustine more carefully and extensively than his predecessors, allowing him to critique Auriol and Ockham for their Semipelagianism. Blessed Gregory was strongly shaped by Augustinian soteriology, arguing for the traditional Augustinian and Catholic teaching on predestination. He taught that, from the beginning of time, God freed whom He willed from the massa perditionis merely on the basis of His good-pleasure, without consideration of future merits, leaving others in their sin.

Gregory adhered strictly to Saint Augustine's doctrine on the punishments of those who die in a state of merely original sin. Against the pelagians, Saint Augustine taught that those who die without sanctifying grace, given in baptism, are guilty of original sin. Therefore, they not only cannot go to heaven, but because of their exclusion from heaven, can only go to hell, which original sin deserves. They are given the same punishments as all those in hell, though the sensual pains they are punished with, as Saint Augustine said, are “the lightest”. This view was held by most of the Church Fathers in the West, but came into scrutiny in Lombard’s time. Because Lombard himself wrote against it, the view became less common among later scholastics. Fr. Johannes Laurentius Berti, O.E.S.A., treats the topic thoroughly in book 13, “On Original Sin”, of his Opus de Theologicis Disciplinis.

=== Reformed and Catholic Theology ===
Blessed Gregory was claimed by some of the early Reformed authors, even Luther himself in the Luther-Eck Disputations, to support the Protestant views on nature and grace. They mainly claimed him on two subjects: first, in their belief that concupiscence is formally sinful, and second, in their belief that all of the works performed by an unjust man are sins.

Concerning the first, Gregory takes the traditional Augustinian view that concupiscence is materially sin, but can be referred to as “sin” in the unregenerate insofar as the form of original sin—the privation of original justice—inheres in concupiscence. Hence Gregory says that, “there is, in the baptized, original concupiscence, but this is not sin; and thus, properly speaking concerning sin, that is, guilt, the baptized does not have original sin.” (Est igitur in baptizato originalis concupiscentia, sed ipsa non est in eo peccatum; ac per hoc proprie loquendo de peccato, scilicet culpa, nec ipse baptizatus habet originale peccatum.) That is, because sin, properly speaking, is constituted by guilt, and original sin is taken in baptism “as regards its guilt” (quantum ad reatum), there can be no original sin in the regenerate, even though the same concupiscence remains. Fr. Berti explicates his view very thoroughly in a response to an objection in book 13 of his Opus.

Concerning the second, Blessed Gregory again takes the Augustinian view. Because all actions must be directed towards God as their ultimate end—since our free will is nothing other than a means to reach God our end (as St. Thomas calls it, “vim mediorum electivam”), so using it in a way that doesn’t conduce to the attainment of God, the end, is an abuse of it, and thus sinful—and because our actions cannot be directed to God as our end without the aid of God’s grace, because without grace we act for our own gain in pleasure or pride, any act performed without God’s grace must be a sin. However, the Augustinians are very clear that, in order to direct works to God, merely actual grace is needed: habitual or sanctifying grace is not needed. Thus, even non-Christians, who aren’t in a state of sanctifying or habitual grace, can still perform good works—though they are merely naturally, and not supernaturally and meritoriously good, and are rarely found (vix inveniuntur as Saint Augustine says). On this point, see Fr. Berti’s treatment of it in the Opus, or Fr. Petrus Manso, O.E.S.A.’s book Synopsis de Virtutibus Infidelium.

=== Theory of sentences ===
Initially, with the intention of defining theology and natural sciences, Gregory developed a theory of sentences to describe scientific knowledge. He believed sentences neither to be extra-mental nor propositional; in this theory, sentences signify something exclusively by the make-up of their terms, but are neither reducible to individual terms nor are "mental sentences" identifiable. Defenders of this view claim that beliefs about the world are too complicated to correspond to specific language structures and thus, cannot serve as objects of scientific knowledge.

=== Nominalism ===
Gregory had a unique take on traditional nominalist views. He thought that to contrive understanding in physical reality by incorporating abstract objects was nonsensical, due to his belief that mental objects are used strictly for useful social conventions and nothing else. With this divide between complex thought and physical reality, Gregory also believed statements describing infinitely many points, infinitely many lines, infinitely many planes, etc. are all false. Since these are all mental, abstract objects, they only exist in the minds of people who think about them. Thus, the notion of physical infinity is not applicable. Furthermore, God was always in close relation to these abstract objects, too. Gregory's nominalist view claims that God has the ability to distinguish abstract objects but has no need to manipulate them. To him, God has no need to manipulate mathematical propositions because he exists outside of time and thus, has no need to think about the individual abstract objects anyway.

== Works ==
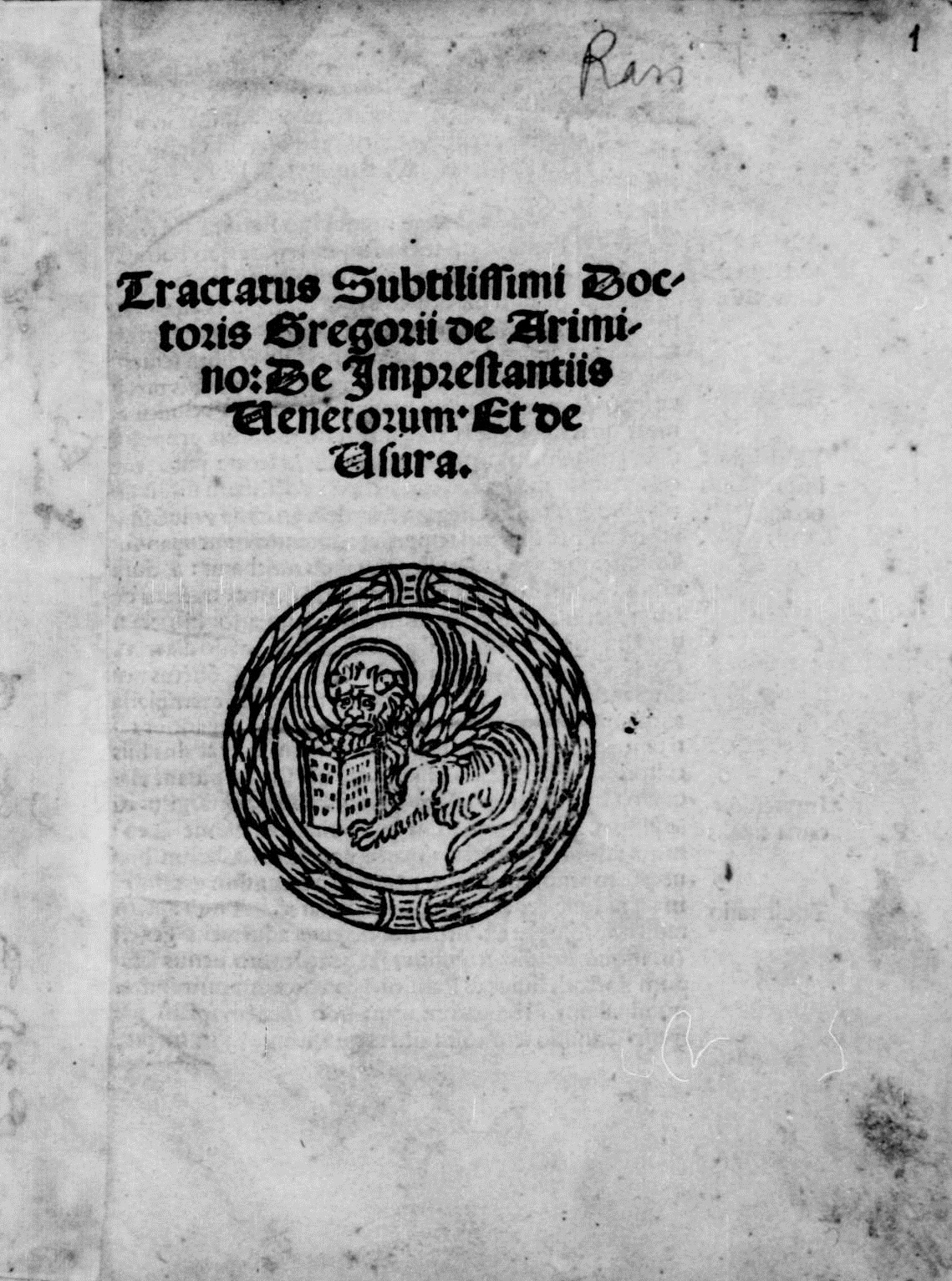
De imprestanciis venetorum (De usura), 1508

- Gregorii Ariminensis OESA Lectura super Primum et Secundum Sententiarum edited by A. Trapp et al., Berlin and New York: Walter de Gruyter.
  - Tomus I: Super Primum (Dist. 1-6), 1981.
  - Tomus II: Super Primum (Dist. 17-17), 1982.
  - Tomus III: Super Primum (Dist. 19-48), 1984.
  - Tomus IV: Super Secundum (Dist. 1-5), 1979.
  - Tomus V: Super Secundum (Dist. 6-18), 1979.
  - Tomus VI: Super Secundum (Dist. 24-44), 1980.
  - Tomus VII: Indices, 1987.
  - Old editions:
    - Gregorii Ariminiensis...super Primum et Secundum Sententiarum, Saint Bonaventure, NY: Franciscan Institute, 1955 [reprint of 1494 edition].
    - Gregorij Ariminiensis Ordonis Hermitaru[m] Diui Augustini ac Sacri Pagine Magistri in Secundo Sententiar[um] Admiranda Expositio, Milan, 1494.
- De usura
  - De imprestanciis venetorum... et de usura (in Latin). Reggio nell'Emilia: Lodovico Mazzali. 1508.
- De quatuor virtutibus cardinalibus
- De intentione et remissione formarum

== See also ==
- Augustinian soteriology
