= John Pagus =

John Pagus (/ˈpeɪɡəs/; fl. first half of the 13th century) was a scholastic philosopher at the University of Paris, generally considered the first logician writing at the Arts faculty at Paris.

== Life ==
He is thought to have been a Master of Arts in the 1220s and to have taught Peter of Spain. At that time he was writing on syncategorematic terms.

== Works ==
- Appellationes
- Commentary on the Sentences
- Rationes super Predicamenta Aristotelis
- Syncategoremata
