= Evrard Wendenbaum =

French explorer (born 1979)

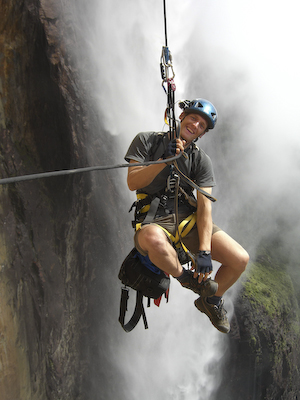
- Born: March 13, 1979 (age 47); Saint-Martin-d'Hères, France
- Education: University of Paris
- Occupations: Photographer; Filmmaker; Geologist; Explorer

Evrard Wendenbaum (born 13 March 1979) is a French outdoor photographer, filmmaker, geologist and explorer.

== Photography ==
Since 2001, from his numerous expeditions, he brought a large number of publications in the French press (including Paris-Match, Sport, Vertical, Montagnes Magazine and Climbing) and International (including Aktuell, View, Pareti, Alpinist, Rock and Ice, Escalar, Muntana, Alp and Klatring). His photos have also regularly fuelled means of communication (catalogues, posters, press advertising and websites) of various companies (including Petzl, Beal, Expé, Vertical, Lafuma and Migoo) and institutions (City Grenoble).

== Filmography ==
In 2006, he directed his first film during a climbing expedition in Venezuela. Amazonian Vertigo won 11 awards in the greatest adventure and mountain film festival for best adventure film, best mountain film, best climbing film,... In 2007, Makay : le dernier Eden, a 26-minute documentary following the first exploration of the Makay massif in Madagascar, won the best biodiversity film award in Marseille. In 2008, he followed with two video clips for Nike ACG and two short documentary films about two expeditions in Alaska. In 2009, he directed Le méridien des Ecrins about a mountain self-supported high altitude adventure in the Ecrins massif in France. This film won two awards as best mountain film. In 2010 and 2011, he co-authored and played his own role as expedition leader of a great scientific expedition in the Makay massif. This film, the first adventure film shot in 3D will be released by the end of 2011 on Canal+ and Discovery channel. He also directed and is currently editing two other scientific documentaries.

== Expeditions ==
This traveler visits various parts of the world to find remote and difficult-to-reach locations. His work mostly focuses on spending time in natural environments. Since 1999, he organized various expeditions, sporting first (climbing, trekking, mountaineering, canyoning, kayaking), and then recently, he went on scientific and exploration projects. His most extensive expedition took place over three months during the winter of 2011. During this time, he traveled to the Makay Mountains in Madagascar.

- 1999: Argentina (Tentative first descent in snowboard of Aconcagua, higher top of America (6962 m))
- 2000: USA (Escalade and trek in the national parks of the American West), the Balearic Islands (Canyoning)
- 2001: Bulgaria (Trekking in all mass in the country), USA (Climbing in Yosemite National Park with the ascent of Half Dome and El Capitan)
- 2002: Turkey (Hiking and canyon in the exploration of the massive Aladaglar)
- 2003: Reunion Island (First Canyoning Traverse of the island), Algeria (Trekking and climbing exploration in the Tassili N'Ajjer)
- 2004: Morocco (exploration trekking and climbing in the mountain of Jebel Sarho), Madagascar (Exploration by canoe, mountain bike, climbing)
- 2005: Croatia (Exploration Sea Kayaking in new areas of escalation on the island of Hvar), Patagonia (Exploration and first to Ski in the mountain of Fitz Roy, winner scholarship Expé 2005), Sardinia (Photo essay on the climbing walls marines on the island), India (Exploring new areas of escalation in the south and ski mountaineering in the Himalayas)
- 2006: Mayotte (Sea kayak Round of the island), Pakistan (First free climbing west pillar of Nameless Trango Tower 6253 m), Alaska (First ski descents in the mountain of Denali and Sea kayaking around Kenai Peninsula), Venezuela (Second free ascent of Salto Angel, highest waterfall in the world), India (Exploration and opening new climbing areas in the south)
- 2007: Madagascar Trek in the Andringitra Massif, kayaking trip in the country sinners Vezo, and First exploration of the Makay mountains (adventure, canyoning, climbing)
- 2008: India Climbing trip in Hampi, Alaska Complete ski crossing of the Kenai Peninsula
- 2009: Algeria Trekking and climbing exploration in the Tassili N'Ajjer and buggy kiting in the Sahara desert
- 2010: Madagascar First scientific expedition in the Makay mountains in January (11 scientists), First exploration of the northern Makay mountains and another bigger one over two months in November–December (40 scientists).
- 2011: Madagascar Last scientific expedition in the Makay mountains (20 scientists)
