= Adèle Evrard =

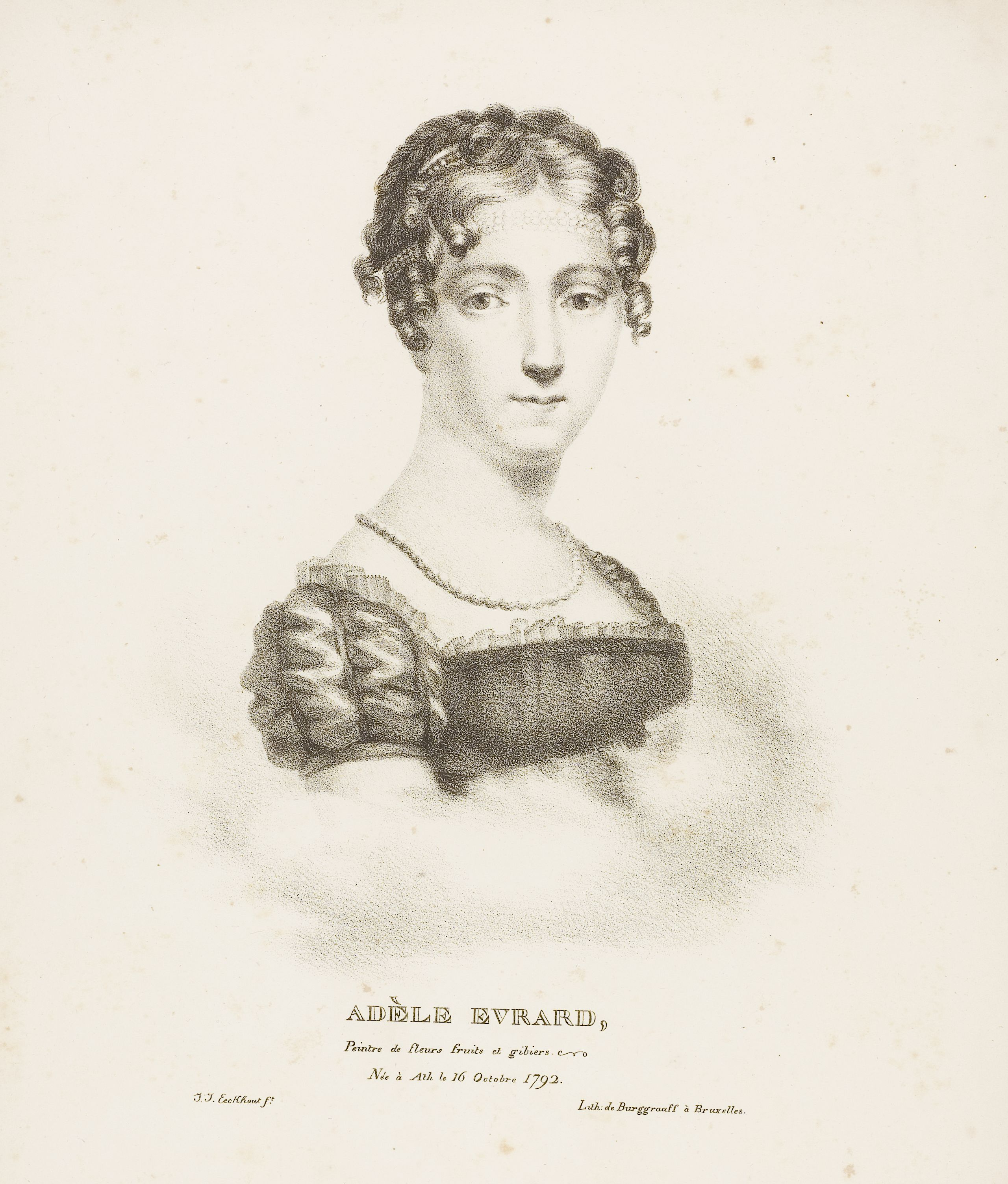
- portrait by Jacob Joseph Eeckhout
- Born: October 5, 1792; Ath
- Died: July 22, 1889 (aged 96); Ath
- Occupation: Painter

Adèle Agnès Evrard (October 5, 1792 – July 22, 1889) was a Belgian still life painter, known for her paintings of flowers, game, and fruit.

Adèle Agnès Evrard was born on October 5, 1792 in Ath, Hainaut, Belgium, the daughter of Philippe Joseph Evrard, a candlemaker, and Pétronille Bogaert Evrard . She studied under the painter Julien-Joseph Ducorron, her brother-in-law.

She exhibited at the Ghent Salon in 1820 and won awards at exhibitions in Douai in 1821 and in Cambrai in 1828. She became a member of the Royal Academy of Fine Arts, Brussels in 1825.

Adèle Agnès Evrard died on 22 July 1889 in Ath.

== Gallery ==
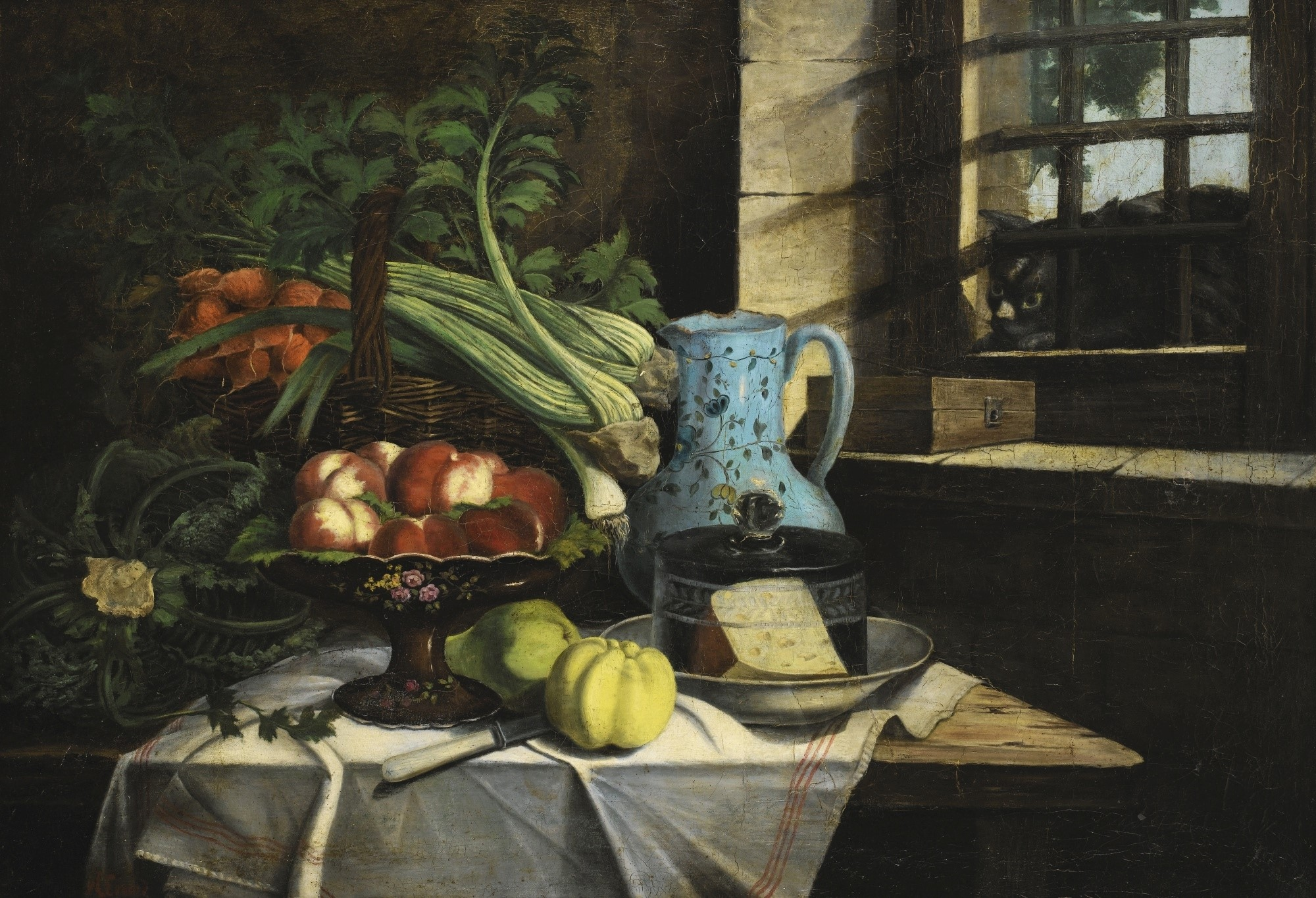
Still Life with a Cat
