= James of Metz =

Fourteenth century philosopher

James Metz was a fourteenth century philosopher and Dominican theologian.

== Biography ==
Very little is known about his life. It is not known when he was born or when he died, but what is known is that he was philosophically active in the first decade of the fourteenth century. Of his works that survived, much remains unedited, and only a dozen manuscript copies still exist. James was known as a Dominican theologian, which meant following the teachings of Saint Thomas Aquinas. However, he earned the reputation for being a "critical-Thomist," as he openly disagreed some of Aquinas's positions. One account of James describes him as an “eclectic thinker,” and that his works were partially influenced by Peter of Auvergne as well as Henry of Ghent.

== Work ==
The only philosophical work of James's that is known for certain is that he gave two lectures on Peter Lombard’s Sentences. Presumably, these lectures occurred at the University of Paris, roughly from 1300-1306. An instance in which James did not see eye-to-eye with Aquinas was in regard to the way Aquinas described individuation by matter. Aquinas held the view that that matter is the principle of individuation. James, on the other hand, believed that form is the principle of individuation. Another disagreement between James and Aquinas concerned the process of knowledge, primarily knowledge of immaterial substances and knowledge of God. James’s views differed from those of Aquinas in that James attempted to find compatibility between Augustinian and Aristotelian accounts of knowledge. These disagreements with Aquinas warranted criticism from the Master General of Dominican Order, Hervaeus Natalis, as he wrote a doctrine called "A Correction of Brother James Metz." Concerning the divine essence, James held the view that it functioned as an origin, and that it “performs solely in relation to being.” James advocated that there is a duality to the divine essence. In one instance, it is a pure essence, the sole origin of our act and our being. In the second instance, James believed essence can also be seen as an attribute, and that it is the cause of specific actions.
