= Everard of Ypres =

French scholastic philosopher and Cistercian monk

Everard of Ypres was a scholastic philosopher of the middle of the twelfth century, a master of the University of Paris who became a Cistercian monk of the abbey of Moutier of Argonne. He had worked also for Cardinal Giacinto Bobone, the future Pope Celestine III.

He studied with Gilbert de la Porrée, first in Chartres and then in Paris, moving from four hearers to huge audiences in the hundreds. He is an important commentator on the dispute between Gilbert and Bernard of Clairvaux, about which he later wrote. The Dialogus Ratii et Everardi, a work dated to the 1190s, and variously considered either fictional or based on real conversations, contains an exposition of Gilbert's views. The dialogue is presented between a letter to Pope Urban III and another letter, a literary structure that has been traced back to Sulpicius Severus.

The identification of the author of the Dialogus and the canonist author of Summula decretionum quaestionum, dated c.1180, was made by N. M. Häring; but this is not universally accepted. The Summula is a digest of the Summa of Sicardus of Cremona.
