= Adam of Wodeham =

14th-century English philosopher and theologian

Adam of Wodeham, OFM (1298–1358) was a philosopher and theologian. Currently, Wodeham is best known for having been a secretary of William Ockham and for his interpretations of John Duns Scotus. But Wodeham was also an influential thinker in his own right who made valuable philosophical contributions during his life.

== Early life and education ==
Wodeham was born near Southampton, England, in 1298.

Apart from his association with Scotus and Ockham, very little is known about Wodeham's early upbringing and education. The information that is available seems to be based upon what scholars know from other sources about education in England at the beginning of the 14th century. Since contemporary scholars know that Wodeham was a part of the Franciscan intellectual tradition, several assumptions can be made about Wodeham's education. To begin with, Wodeham most likely began his education in England by entering the Franciscan Order sometime between the ages of 14 and 18. After having begun his education, Wodeham would have studied philosophy and theology in various stages for about 13 years.

According to William J. Courtenay, Wodeham met William Ockham sometime between 1320 and 1324. During this period of his life, Wodeham was finishing his studies in philosophy. In light of the fact that much of Wodeham's work supported Ockham's thought, it seems that Wodeham's views were greatly influenced by his interactions with Ockham. The works Wodeham produced in support of Ockham were partly responsible for Ockham's prominence.

Following this portion of his life, Wodeham studied theology at Oxford between 1326 and 1329. Although Wodeham did not produce much original work during this portion of his life, he appears to have gained the confidence to develop his own views and to think outside of the current paradigm. At the pinnacle of his career, Wodeham's willingness to be original resulted in many of his views being regarded as controversial.

Susan Brower-Toland gives one important example of this point. She argues that when Wodeham introduced the notion commonly referred to as "complexe significabile," or “something that can be signified [only] by a propositional expression,” he was introducing a new and important idea. According to Brower-Toland, Wodeham's introduction of this term signified “a fairly radical departure from the standard medieval-Aristotelian substance-accident framework.”

== Career ==
Between the years 1329 and 1332, Wodeham's work became much more widespread and accessible as a result of lectures he gave at Norwich on Peter Lombard's “Sentences.” The topics at the Norwich lectures were quite diverse. Themes included everything from biblical interpretation to physics. Wodeham gave lectures at Norwich, London, and Oxford. At this point in time, the order and relationship of these lectures appears to be a matter of controversy.

Following these lectures at Norwich, sometime immediately after 1330, Wodeham's career advanced and he began to lecture at Oxford. During this portion of his life, Wodeham lectured on theological topics. It is believed that Wodeham elaborated and built upon his Norwich lectures during this time. These lectures became available in Latin only in 1990. Currently, these lectures are the primary work available of Wodeham's. This stage of Wodeham's life at Oxford reached its completion just prior to 1340.

It was during Wodeham's time at Oxford that he became most intellectually influential. Apart from the obvious interactions and dialogues that Wodeham had with his colleagues at Oxford, he also became well known in Paris during his Oxford years. As Courtenay points out in his biography on Wodeham, “[A]lmost all Parisian authors between 1342 and 1345 cite Wodeham.” Wodeham's work continued to be influential into the beginning of the 16th century.

== Death ==
Sometime around 1340 Wodeham left both Oxford and England. During this time away from England, Wodeham traveled for an undocumented period of time. Eventually Wodeham came back to England and died, possibly from the plague, at Babwell Convent in 1358. Not much is known about Wodeham's life after he left Oxford.

== Works ==
- Adam of Wodeham, Foreword, in William of Ockham, Summa Logicae, edited by Philotheus Boehner, Gedeon Gál, and Stephen Brown, Saint Bonaventure, NY: Franciscan Institute, 1974.
- Adam of Wodeham, Lectura Secunda in Librum Primum Sententiarum (3 vols.), 1: Prologus et distinctio prima; 2: Distinctiones II-VII; 3: Distinctiones VIII-XXVI edited by Rega Wood and Gedeon Gál, St. Bonaventure, NY: St. Bonaventure University, 1990.
- Adam de Wodeham, Tractatus de Indivisibilibus, edited and translated by Rega Wood, Dordrecht: Reidel, 1988.

== See also ==
- John Mair
- Henry of Oyta
