= Adam Pulchrae Mulieris =

Adam Pulchrae Mulieris, also called Adam de Puteorumvilla (fl. c. 1225), was a Paris master who studied under Peter of Lamballe, who flourished in the first half of the 13th century. Little is known of his life. He has been described as one of the “metaphysicians of light” (Robert Grosseteste was another). He was a contemporary of William of Auvergne, and his works are cited by Richard de Fournival, Gerard of Abbeville and Thomas Aquinas. The origin of his name is unknown.

The only book seriously attributed to him is Memoriale Rerum Difficilium, also known as De Intelligentiis. This was originally attributed to Witelo. It was published as Adam's in 1908 but in the 1930s the question of this attribution was re-opened.
