= Michael of Massa =

Michael of Massa (Latin: Michaelus Massensis; Michael Beccucci de Massa) (died 1337) was an Italian Augustinian Hermit and theologian. He is known both as a scholastic philosopher and as an author of contemplative works.

He wrote a Sentences commentary, probably through the 1320s and 1330s, and left unfinished.

His Vita Christi was a major influence on the more famous work of the same name by Ludolph of Saxony.
