= Peter of Auvergne =

French philosopher and theologian

Peter of Auvergne (died 1304) was a French philosopher and theologian.

== Life ==
He was a canon of Paris; some biographers have thought that he was Bishop of Clermont, because a Bull of Boniface VIII of the year 1296 names as canon of Paris a certain Peter of Croc (Cros), already canon of Clermont; but it is more likely that they are distinct. Peter of Auvergne was in Paris in 1301, and, according to several accounts, was a pupil of Thomas Aquinas. In 1279, while the various nations of the University of Paris were quarrelling about the rectorship, Simon de Brion, papal legate, appointed Peter of Auvergne to that office; in 1296 he was elected to it.

== Works ==
His published works are:

- "Supplementum Commentarii S. Thomæ in tertium et quartum librum de cælo et mundo" (in "Opera S. Thomæ", II, ad finem)
- commentaries on Aristotle's Meteororum, De juventute et senectute, De longitudine et brevitate vitae, De motu animalium.

He has been credited with a supplement to Aquinas' Summa Theologica.

Peter also left numerous treatises which are either at the Bibliothèque nationale de France or at the Arsenal de Paris: "Sex quodlibeta" (six quodlibeta), long discussions after the manner of St. Thomas; "Sophisma Determinatum"; "Quæstiones super totam logicam veterem Arist."; "Quæstiones super Porphyrium"; "In Arist. Metaphysicam"; "In libros Politicorum"; "De somno et vigilia"; "De veget. et plantis"; "De anima".

=== Translations ===
- Questions on Aristotle's De caelo , ed. G Galle, (Leuven, 2003)
- Commentary on Aristotle's On Length and Shortness of Life , ed. M Dunne, Archives d'histoire doctrinale et litteraire du moyen age 69, (2002), 153–200
- Robert Andrews (1988) Peter of Auvergne's commentary on Aristotle's 'Categories': Edition, translation, and analysis. (Volumes I and II) UMI Dissertation Express (Ref. n° 8804534)
- Questions on Books I and II of Aristotle's Nicomachean Ethics, ed. A Celano, Mediaeval Studies 48, (1986), 1–110
- Questiones in Metaphysicam, ed. A Monahan, in JR O'Donnell, ed, Nine Mediaeval Thinkers: A Collection of Hitherto Unedited Texts, (Toronto, 1955), 145–181
