= Nicholas of Autrecourt =

French philosopher (c. 1299–1369)

Nicholas of Autrecourt (French: Nicolas d'Autrécourt; Latin: Nicolaus de Autricuria or Nicolaus de Ultricuria; c. 1299, Autrecourt – 16 or 17 July 1369, Metz) was a French medieval philosopher and Scholastic theologian.

== Life and thought ==
Born in Autrecourt, near Verdun, he was educated at Paris and earned bachelor's degrees in theology and law and a master's degree in arts. Nicholas is known principally for developing skepticism to extreme logical conclusions. He is sometimes considered the sole genuinely skeptic philosopher of medieval times. Nicholas founded his skeptical position on arguments that knowledge claims were not "reducible to the first principle," that is, that it was not contradictory to deny them. His views have been compared to those of David Hume, but it has been suggested that the similarities are superficial, and there is no evidence Nicholas influenced Hume, or other modern philosophers such as René Descartes. Whether Nicholas was committed to skepticism is unclear, but on 19 May 1346 his views were condemned by Pope Clement VI as heretical. Nicholas was sentenced to burn his books publicly and recant, which he did in Paris in 1347.

In the 14th century, Nicholas of Autrecourt considered that matter, space, and time were all made up of indivisible atoms, points, and instants and that all generation and corruption took place by the rearrangement of material atoms. The similarities of his ideas with those of al-Ghazali suggest that Nicholas was familiar with the work of al-Ghazali, who was known as "Algazel" in Europe, either directly or indirectly through Averroes.

Much of the extant knowledge of Nicholas of Autrecourt's epistemology derives from one letter written by magister Egidius (master Giles) to Nicholas and an excerpt from his letter in reply to Egidius and from nine letters written by Nicholas to the Franciscan theologian Bernardus Aretinus (Bernard of Arezzo); however, only two of the nine letters survive. Some fragments of the lost letters are quoted in the records of the condemnatory proceedings against Nicholas. Almost nothing is known about these two correspondents.

== See also ==
- William Curti
