= Peter of Spain =

Spanish philosopher

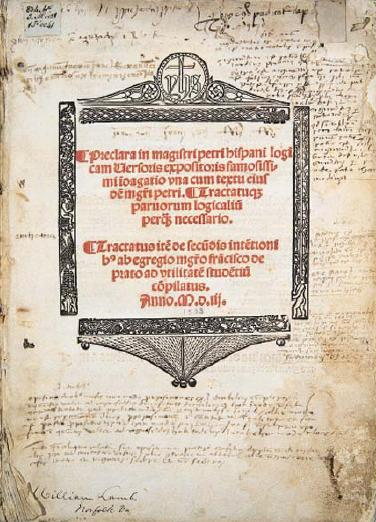
Frontispiece of work by Peter of Hispania

Peter of Hispania (Latin: Petrus Hispanus; Portuguese and Spanish: Pedro Hispano; fl. 13th century) was the author of the Tractatus, later known as the Summulae Logicales, an important medieval university textbook on Aristotelian logic. As the Latin Hispania was considered to include the entire Iberian Peninsula, he is traditionally and usually identified with the medieval Portuguese scholar and ecclesiastic Peter Juliani, who was elected Pope John XXI in 1276. The identification is sometimes disputed, usually by Spanish authors, who claim the author of the Tractatus was a Castilian Blackfriar. He is also sometimes identified as Petrus Ferrandi Hispanus (d. 1254 x 1259).

== Life ==
The author of the Tractatus is assumed to have studied under John Pagus.

== Philosophical works ==
There are a large volume of manuscripts and printed editions of the Summulae Logicales, indicative of its great success throughout European universities well into the seventeenth century. The most recent edition is Peter of Hispania (Petrus Hispanus Portugalensis), Tractatus called afterwards Summule Logicales, edited by Lambertus Marie de Rijk, Wijsgerige Teksten en Studies 22 (Assen: Van Gorcum, 1972). A later logical work of his is, in the most recent edition, Peter of Hispania (Petrus Hispanus Portugalensis), Syncategoreumata, edited by Lambertus Marie de Rijk and translated by Joke Spruyt, Studien und Text zur Geistesgeschichte des Mittelalters 30 (New York: E. J. Brill, 1992).

Peter of Hispania supported an investigation of teaching at the University of Paris which resulted in the Parisian bishop's Condemnation of 1277, which denounced Aristotelian propositions which conflicted with church doctrine.

Dialectica est ars artium, scientia scientiarum, ad omnium methodorum principia viam habens; sola enim dialectica probabiliter disputat de principiis omnium aliarum scientiarum, et ideo in acquisitione omnium aliarum scientiarum dialectica debet esse prior. "Dialectic [that is, logic, in Peter's terminology] is the art of arts, science of sciences, having the way to the principles of all methods; for in fact dialectic alone credibly argues about the principles of all other sciences, and therefore in [one's] acquisition (learning) of all other sciences dialectic must be prior." — Peter of Hispania.

== Medical works ==
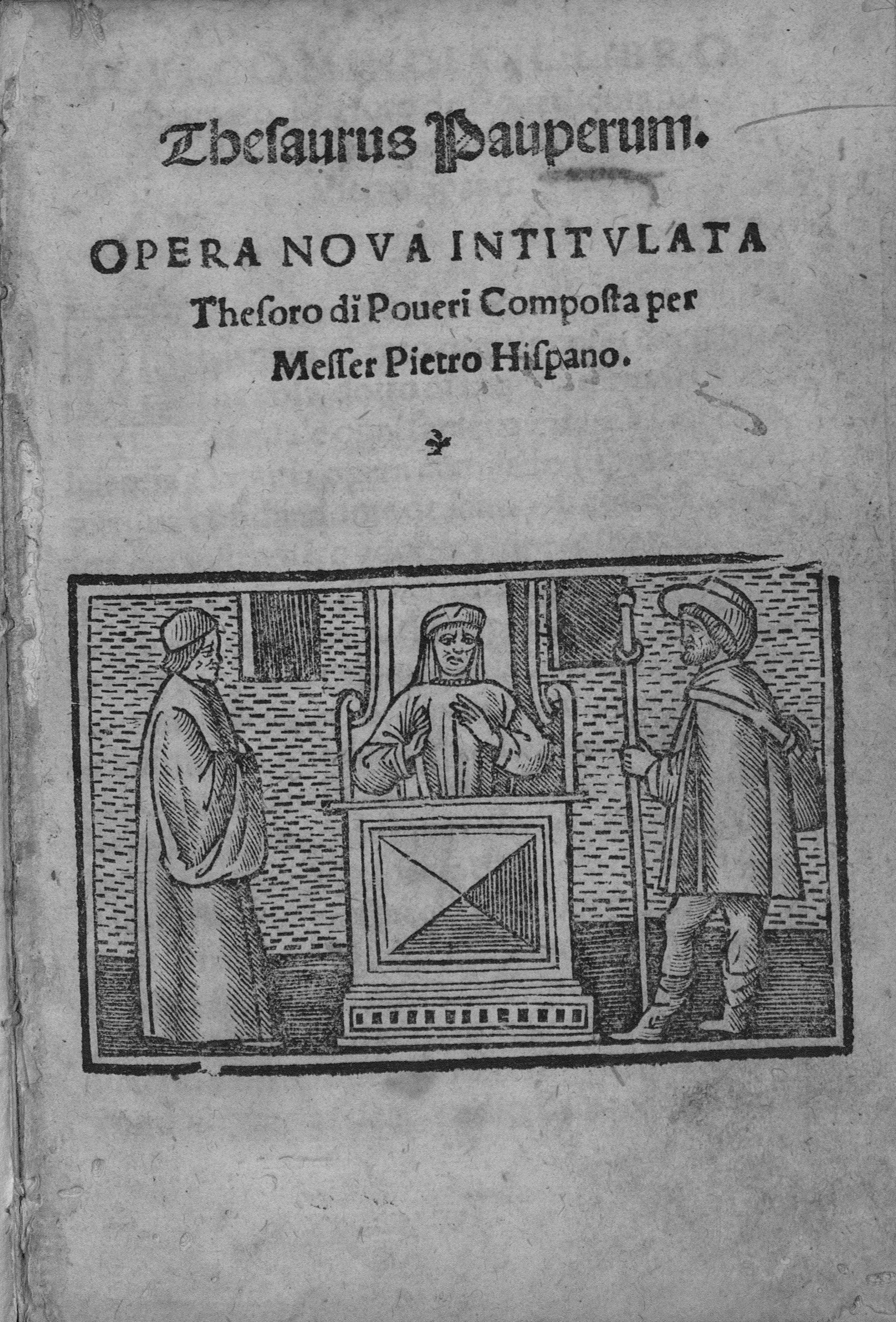
Thesaurus pauperum

A Petrus Hispanus, usually identified as the same scholar, was also credited as the author of a Commentary on Isaac, one of the foundational texts of clinical pharmacology. A Pedro Hispano was also credited with the Treasury of The Poor (Thesaurus Pauperum), a comprehensive medical manual of diseases and remedies.

== English translations ==
- Peter of Spain Summaries of Logic, Text, Translation, Introduction, and Notes by Brian P. Copenhaver, Calvin G. Normore, Terence Parsons, New York, Oxford University Press, 2014. Another translation of Peter's Tractatus (=Summule Logicales) is Francis P. Dinneen, trans., Language in Dispute: An English Translation of Peter of Spain’s Tractatus called afterwards Summulae Logicales, ed. L. M. De Rijk, Studies in the History of the Language Sciences, vol. 39, Amsterdam Studies in the Theory and History of Linguistic Science 3 (Philadelphia: John Benjamins Publishing Company, 1990).
