= William of Ockham =

English Franciscan friar and theologian (c. 1287–1347)

William of Ockham OFM
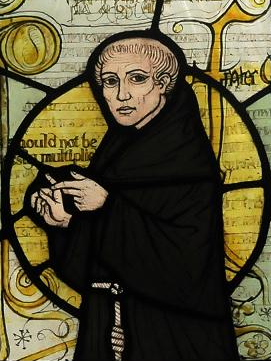
- William of Ockham depicted on a stained glass window by Lawrence Lee at All Saints' Church, Ockham
- Born: c. 1287; Ockham, Surrey, England
- Died: 9/10 April 1347; Munich, Duchy of Bavaria, Holy Roman Empire

Education
- Education: Greyfriars, London; University of Oxford

Philosophical work
- Era: Medieval philosophy
- Region: Western philosophy
- School: Scholasticism; Occamism; Nominalism (Note: However, Ockham has also been interpreted as a defender of conceptualism.); Theological voluntarism
- Main interests: Natural philosophy; metaphysics; epistemology; theology; logic; ontology; politics; Theological voluntarism
- Notable works: Sum of Logic
- Notable ideas: Occam's razor; Nominalism; Empiricism

William of Ockham or Occam (/ˈɒkəm/ OK-əm; Latin: Guillelmus de Ockham; c. 1287 – 9/10 April 1347) was an English Franciscan friar, scholastic philosopher and theologian. He is considered to be one of the major figures of medieval thought and was at the centre of the major intellectual and political controversies of the 14th century. The nominalists of the fifteenth century regarded him as one of the founders of their movement. He is widely known for Occam's razor, the methodological principle that bears his name. He produced significant works on logic, physics and theology. Ockham is remembered in the Church of England with a commemoration corresponding to the commonly ascribed date of his death on 10 April.

== Life ==
William of Ockham was probably born in Ockham, Surrey, around 1287. At an early age he became a member of the Franciscan Order (Order of Friars Minor) and received the first stages of his theological education in the Franciscan school in London. From some undetermined date until probably 1321 he studied in the Franciscan school in the University of Oxford. Although he completed all the requirements for a master's degree in theology, he never was a regent master. Because of this he was later called the Venerabilis Inceptor. (An inceptor was someone recognized by the university as qualified to begin ("incept") as a regent master.)

A scholar seeking to become a Master of Theology was required to give lectures on Peter Lombard's Sentences. These lectures (which were usually in the form of disputed questions) were often copied and circulated, and a "Commentary on the Sentences" was often a theologian's main publication. Ockham's disputations on the Sentences were held probably in the years 1317-1319. His Sentences commentary has been edited in his Opera Theologica.

After qualifying for the Mastership, Ockham was sent by his Order to one of its schools, probably the school in London where he had previously been a student. Most of the works he produced during this time were philosophical, rather than theological. They included commentaries on several logical treatises of Aristotle, a commentary on Aristotle's Physics, and a Summary of Logic. His output during this time was prodigious. The works Ockham produced during this period have been edited in his Opera Philosophica.

His teaching work was interrupted in 1324 by a summons to the papal court, at that time located in Avignon, to defend his Sentences commentary. (An alternative hypothesis, recently proposed by George Knysh, is that he was initially appointed in Avignon as a professor of philosophy in the Franciscan school there, and that his disciplinary difficulties did not begin until 1327.) The Pope, Pope John XXII, directed former Oxford chancellor John Lutterell, who had come to Avignon looking for advancement, to prepare a collection of suspect passages from Ockham's Sentences commentary, and a committee of theologians was appointed to review them. The committee's preliminary reports were critical, but the process was never brought to a conclusion.

While he was in Avignon, Ockham became involved in the dispute about Apostolic poverty. The Rule of Saint Francis commanded members of the Order to practice the poverty of Jesus and his apostles, who, the Franciscans maintained, owned nothing either individually or "in common" (i.e. as a group). In several papal bulls or "constitutions" Pope John rejected the Franciscan doctrine and practice. In Ad conditorem canonem John argued that no-one could justly consume (i.e. destroy by use) something owned by someone else (for example, food, clothing), so that provision of consumables was a transfer of ownership. He also argued that it was not possible to transfer durables to another person's use permanently without thereby transferring ownership. In Cum inter nonnullos John condemned as heresy the statement that Christ and the Apostles did not have anything individually or as a group. The Minister General (head) of the Franciscan order, Michael of Cesena, asked Ockham to study the pope's bulls. Ockham found in them "a great many things that were heretical, erroneous... adverse to orthodox faith". Together with Michael, Bonagratia of Bergamo, Francis of Marchia and perhaps other members of the Order, Ockham secretly left Avignon on 26 May 1328. The dissident Franciscans eventually took refuge in Munich, under the protection of the Holy Roman Emperor Louis IV of Bavaria, who was also engaged in a dispute with Pope John over the question whether he ought to have obtained the Pope's approval to become Emperor. On June 6, 1328, Ockham and the other dissidents were excommunicated for leaving Avignon without permission.

Most members of the Franciscan Order submitted to the decrees of Pope John. Ockham and other members of the small band of dissident Franciscans in Munich (the "Michaelists") campaigned for years to get John XXII and his successors Benedict XII and Clement VI deposed from the papacy. The writings Ockham published during those years are often called his "political writings" (Opera Politica), because they deal with many matters relevant to political philosophy. After he left Avignon Ockham seems to have written nothing more on the topics of his academic work in England. William of Ockham died probably on either 9 or 10 April 1347 (just before the outbreak in Munich of the Black Death).

== Philosophical thought ==
Ockham incorporated much of the work of some previous theologians, especially Duns Scotus. From Scotus Ockham derived his view of divine omnipotence, his view of grace and justification, much of his epistemology and ethics. He disagreed with Scotus about predestination, penance, universals, and the formal distinction ex parte rei ("on the part of the thing") in creatures.

=== Faith and reason ===
William of Ockham held that theology is not a science. "Only faith gives us access to theological truths. The ways of God are not open to reason, for God has freely chosen to create a world and establish a way of salvation within it apart from any necessary laws that human logic or rationality can uncover." Science includes empirical knowledge and conclusions demonstrated from self-evident premises.

=== Nominalism ===
As noted above, fifteenth-century nominalists regarded Ockham as one of the founders of their movement. Some modern scholars think that it would be better to call his position "terminism" or "conceptualism" rather than "nominalism", because in Ockham's view individuals are not only names (understood as spoken words) but also concepts, which occur as "terms" in a statement (spoken, written or thought). Universals (e.g. "human being") are individuals -- sounds in the air, inscriptions on paper or other surfaces, or concepts (mental pictures or mental acts) -- that signify or stand for other individuals (e.g. Socrates, Plato, Joe Blow). A universal can stand for many things because those things are similar to one another. Ockham did not hold that resemblances are imposed by the human mind: really, i.e. truly, apart from human thinking, some things resemble some other things.

=== Efficient reasoning ===
One important contribution that he made to modern science and modern intellectual culture was efficient reasoning with the principle of parsimony in explanation and theory building that came to be known as Occam's razor. This maxim, as interpreted by Bertrand Russell, states that if one can explain a phenomenon without assuming this or that hypothetical entity, there is no ground for assuming it, i.e. that one should always opt for an explanation in terms of the fewest possible causes, factors, or variables. He turned this into a concern for ontological parsimony; the principle says that one should not multiply entities beyond necessity—Entia non sunt multiplicanda sine necessitate—although this well-known formulation of the principle is not to be found in any of Ockham's extant writings. He formulates it as: "For nothing ought to be posited without a reason given, unless it is self-evident (literally, known through itself) or known by experience or proved by the authority of Sacred Scripture." For William of Ockham, the only truly necessary entity is God; everything else is contingent. He thus does not accept the principle of sufficient reason, rejects the distinction between essence and existence, and opposes the Thomistic doctrine of active and passive intellect. His scepticism to which his ontological parsimony request leads appears in his doctrine that human reason can prove neither the immortality of the soul; nor the existence, unity, and infinity of God. These truths, he teaches, are known to us by revelation alone.

=== Natural philosophy ===
Ockham wrote a great deal on natural philosophy, including a long commentary on Aristotle's Physics. According to the principle of ontological parsimony, he holds that we do not need to allow entities in all ten of Aristotle's categories; we thus do not need the category of quantity, as the mathematical entities are not "real". Mathematics must be applied to other categories, such as the categories of substance or qualities, thus anticipating modern scientific renaissance while violating Aristotelian prohibition of metabasis.

=== Theory of knowledge ===
In the theory of knowledge, Ockham rejected the scholastic theory of species, as unnecessary and not supported by experience, in favour of a theory of abstraction. This was an important development in late medieval epistemology. He also distinguished between intuitive and abstract cognition; intuitive cognition depends on the existence or non-existence of the object, whereas abstractive cognition "abstracts" the object from the existence predicate. Interpreters are, as yet, undecided about the roles of these two types of cognitive activities.

=== Political theory ===
William of Ockham is also increasingly being recognized as an important contributor to the development of Western constitutional ideas, especially those of government with limited responsibility. He was one of the first medieval authors to advocate a form of church/state separation, and was important for the early development of the notion of property rights. His political ideas are regarded as "natural" or "secular", holding for a secular absolutism. The views on monarchical accountability espoused in his Dialogus (written between 1332 and 1347) greatly influenced the Conciliar movement. This tract on heresy had the ultimate purpose to establish the possibility of papal heresy and to consider what action should be taken against a pope who had become a heretic.

Ockham argued for complete separation of spiritual rule and earthly rule. He thought that the pope and churchmen have no right or grounds at all for secular rule like having property, citing 2 Timothy 2:4. That belongs solely to earthly rulers, who may also accuse the pope of crimes, if need be.

After the Fall he believed God had given humanity, including non-Christians, two powers: private ownership and the right to set their rulers, who should serve the interest of the people, not some special interests. Thus he preceded Thomas Hobbes in formulating social contract theory along with earlier scholars.

William of Ockham said that the Franciscans avoided both private and common ownership by using commodities, including food and clothes, without any rights, with mere usus facti, the ownership still belonging to the donor of the item or to the pope. Their opponents such as Pope John XXII wrote that use without any ownership cannot be justified: "It is impossible that an external deed could be just if the person has no right to do it."

Thus the disputes on the heresy of Franciscans led Ockham and others to formulate some fundamentals of economic theory and the theory of ownership.

According to John Kilcullen, "Ockham's Utilitarian theory of property, his defence of civil and (within limits) religious liberty, and his emphasis on the inevitability of exceptions to rules and the need to adapt institutions to changing circumstances, anticipate J.S. Mill" (via Aristotle).

=== Logic ===
In logic, William of Ockham wrote down in words the formulae that would later be called De Morgan's laws, and he pondered ternary logic, that is, a logical system with three truth values; a concept that would be taken up again in the mathematical logic of the 19th and 20th centuries. His contributions to semantics, especially to the maturing theory of supposition, are still studied by logicians. William of Ockham was probably the first logician to treat empty terms in Aristotelian syllogistic effectively; he devised an empty term semantics that exactly fit the syllogistic. Specifically, an argument is valid according to Ockham's semantics if and only if it is valid according to Prior Analytics.

=== Philosophy of Time ===
William of Ockham believed that eternity was exclusive to God. He rejected the concept of the aevum as a special measure of duration of for angels. He also said it is not proper to call eternity a measure of duration. In Ockham's view, there was only one measure of duration, time, which was shared by all creation.

== Theological thought ==
=== Church authority ===
William of Ockham denied papal infallibility and often went into conflict with the pope. As a result, some theologians have viewed him as a proto-Protestant. However, despite his conflicts with the papacy he did not renounce the Roman Catholic Church. Ockham also held that councils of the Church were fallible, he held that any individual could err on matters of faith, and councils being composed of multiple fallible individuals could err. He thus foreshadowed some elements of Luther's view of sola scriptura.

=== Church and State ===
Ockham taught the separation of church and state, believing that the pope and emperor should be separate.

Ockham adversed papal plenitudo potestatis: even the famous allegory of the Sun-Pope/Moon-Emperor is contradicted by Our Lord, who, while admitting the greater/lower opposition (Ockham holds spiritual power and the Church's own functions in the highest esteem; in this sense, and only in this sense, does he consider them of greater importance), does not concede to the Curialists, defenders of the fullness of papal power, the argument that the Moon originated from the Sun.

According to Ockham, the Pope obtains his power from the Council and, therefore, from the whole of all believers. In the same way, the elected Emperor is depositary of a power whose origin lies in the people who are always the authentic sovereign. Ockham developed in canon law the theories that Marsilius of Padua had promoted in civil law (e.g. popular sovereignty).

=== Apostolic poverty ===
Ockham advocated for voluntary poverty.

=== Soul ===
Ockham opposed Pope John XXII on the question of the Beatific Vision. John had proposed that the souls of Christians did not instantly get to enjoy the vision of God, rather such vision would be postponed until the last judgement.

=== Voluntarism ===
William of Ockham was a theological voluntarist who believed that if God had wanted to, he could have become incarnate as a donkey or an ox, or even as both a donkey and a man at the same time. He was criticized for this belief by his fellow theologians and philosophers.

== Literary Ockhamism/nominalism ==
William of Ockham and his works have been discussed as a possible influence on several late medieval literary figures and works, especially Geoffrey Chaucer, but also Jean Molinet, the Gawain poet, François Rabelais, John Skelton, Julian of Norwich, the York and Townely Plays, and Renaissance romances. Only in very few of these cases is it possible to demonstrate direct links to William of Ockham or his texts. Correspondences between Ockhamist and Nominalist philosophy/theology and literary texts from medieval to postmodern times have been discussed within the scholarly paradigm of literary nominalism. Erasmus, in his Praise of Folly, criticized him together with Duns Scotus as fuelling unnecessary controversies inside the Church.

== Works ==
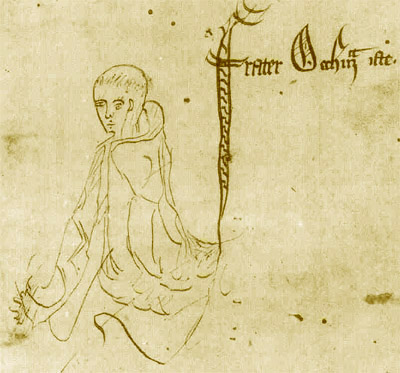
Sketch labelled "frater Occham iste", from a manuscript of Ockham's Summa Logicae, 1341

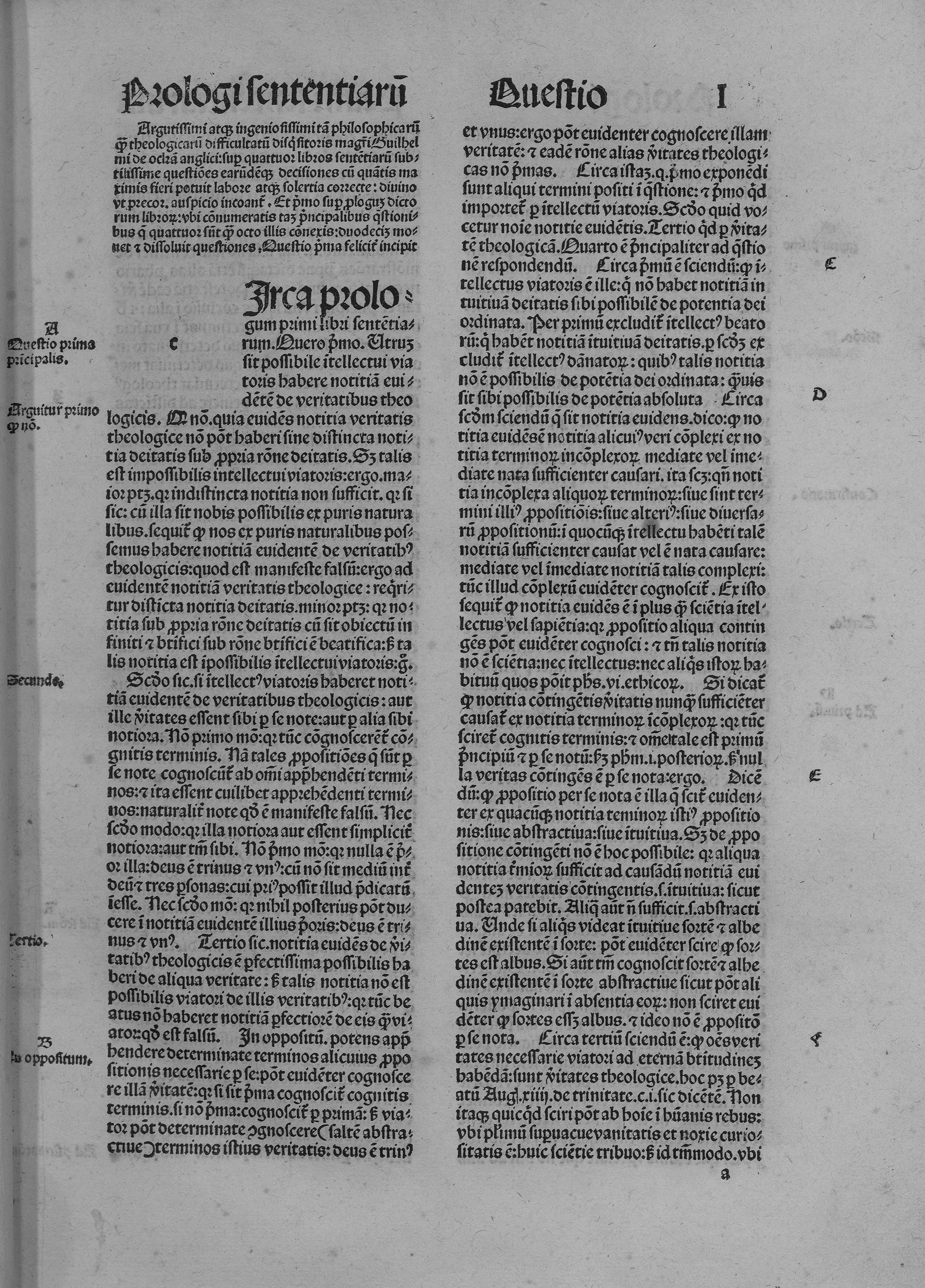
Quaestiones in quattuor libros sententiarum

The standard edition of the philosophical and theological works is: William of Ockham: Opera philosophica et theologica, Gedeon Gál, et al., eds. 17 vols. St. Bonaventure, New York: The Franciscan Institute, 1967–1988. Republished in electronic form by Intelex. Abbreviations: OT = Opera Theologica vol. 1–10; OP = Opera Philosophica vol. 1–7.

OP 7 contains the doubtful and spurious works.

The political works, all but the Dialogus, have been edited in H. S. Offler, et al., eds. Guilelmi de Ockham Opera Politica, 4 vols., 1940–1997, Manchester: Manchester University Press [vols. 1–3]; Oxford: Oxford University Press [vol. 4].

The Dialogus has now been edited and published in print in the British Academy series Auctores Britannici Medii Aevi. The Dialogus website includes translation of the whole work.

=== Philosophical writings ===
- Summa logicae (Sum of Logic) (c. 1323, OP 1).
- Expositionis in Libros artis logicae prooemium, 1321–1324, OP 2).
- Expositio in librum Porphyrii de Praedicabilibus, 1321–1324, OP 2).
- Expositio in librum Praedicamentorum Aristotelis, 1321–1324, OP 2).
- Expositio in librum in librum Perihermenias Aristotelis, 1321–1324, OP 2).
- Tractatus de praedestinatione et de prescientia dei respectu futurorum contingentium (Treatise on Predestination and God's Foreknowledge with respect to Future Contingents, 1322–1324, OP 2).
- Expositio super libros Elenchorum (Exposition of Aristotle's Sophistic refutations, 1322–1324, OP 3).
- Expositio in libros Physicorum Aristotelis. Prologus et Libri I–III (Exposition of Aristotle's Physics) (1322–1324, OP 4).
- Expositio in libros Physicorum Aristotelis. Prologus et Libri IV–VIII (Exposition of Aristotle's Physics) (1322–1324, OP 5).
- Brevis summa libri Physicorum (Brief Summa of the Physics, 1322–23, OP 6).
- Summula philosophiae naturalis (Little Summa of Natural Philosophy, 1319–1321, OP 6).
- Quaestiones in libros Physicorum Aristotelis (Questions on Aristotle's Books of the Physics, before 1324, OP 6).

=== Theological writings ===
- In libros Sententiarum (Commentary on the Sentences of Peter Lombard).
  - Book I (Ordinatio) completed shortly after July 1318 (OT 1–4).
  - Books II–IV (Reportatio) 1317–18 (transcription of the lectures; OT 5–7).
- Quaestiones variae (OT 8).
- Quodlibeta septem (before 1327) (OT 9).
- Tractatus de quantitate (1323–24. OT 10).
- Tractatus de corpore Christi (1323–24, OT 10).

=== Political writings ===
- Opus nonaginta dierum (1332–1334).
- Epistola ad fratres minores (1334).
- Dialogus (before 1335).
- Tractatus contra Johannem [XXII] (1335).
- Tractatus contra Benedictum [XII] (1337–38).
- Octo quaestiones de potestate papae (1340–41).
- Consultatio de causa matrimoniali (1341–42).
- Breviloquium (1341–42).
- De imperatorum et pontificum potestate [also known as Defensorium] (1346–47).

=== Doubtful writings ===
- Tractatus minor logicae (Lesser Treatise on logic) (1340–1347?, OP 7).
- Elementarium logicae (Primer of logic) (1340–1347?, OP 7).

=== Spurious writings ===
- Tractatus de praedicamentis (OP 7).
- Quaestio de relatione (OP 7).
- Centiloquium (OP 7).
- Tractatus de principiis theologiae (OP 7).

=== Translations ===
==== Philosophical works ====
- Philosophical Writings, tr. P. Boehner, rev. S. Brown (Indianapolis, Indiana, 1990)
- Ockham's Theory of Terms: Part I of the Summa logicae, translated by Michael J. Loux (Notre Dame; London: University of Notre Dame Press, 1974) [translation of Summa logicae, part 1]
- Ockham's Theory of Propositions: Part II of the Summa logicae, translated by Alfred J. Freddoso and Henry Schuurman (Notre Dame: University of Notre Dame Press, 1980) [translation of Summa logicae, part 2]
- Demonstration and Scientific Knowledge in William of Ockham: a Translation of Summa logicae III-II, De syllogismo demonstrativo, and Selections from the Prologue to the Ordinatio, translated by John Lee Longeway (Notre Dame, Indiana: University of Notre Dame, 2007)
- Falacies: Part 3, Book 4 of Summa logicae, translated by Richard Robinson (Sunny Lou Publishing, 2025.)
- Ockham on Aristotle's Physics: A Translation of Ockham's Brevis Summa Libri Physicorum, translated by Julian Davies (St. Bonaventure, New York: The Franciscan Institute, 1989)
- Kluge, Eike-Henner W., "William of Ockham's Commentary on Porphyry: Introduction and English Translation", Franciscan Studies 33, pp. 171–254, JSTOR 41974891, and 34, pp. 306–382, JSTOR 44080318 (1973–74)
- Predestination, God's Foreknowledge, and Future Contingents, translated by Marilyn McCord Adams and Norman Kretzmann (New York: Appleton-Century-Crofts, 1969) [translation of Tractatus de praedestinatione et de praescientia Dei et de futuris contigentibus]
- Quodlibetal Questions, translated by Alfred J. Freddoso and Francis E. Kelley, 2 vols (New Haven; London: Yale University Press, 1991) (translation of Quodlibeta septem)
- Paul Spade, Five Texts on the Mediaeval Problem of Universals: Porphyry, Boethius, Abelard, Duns Scotus, Ockham (Indianapolis, Indiana: Hackett, 1994) [Five questions on Universals from His Ordinatio d. 2 qq. 4–8]
- Tractatus de principiis theologiae, translated in A compendium of Ockham's teachings: a translation of the Tractatus de principiis theologiae, translated by Julian Davies (St. Bonaventure, New York: Franciscan Institute, St. Bonaventure University, 1998)

==== Theological works ====
- The De sacramento altaris of William of Ockham, translated by T. Bruce Birch (Burlington, Iowa: Lutheran Literary Board, 1930) [translation of Treatise on Quantity and On the Body of Christ]

==== Political works ====
- An princeps pro suo succursu, scilicet guerrae, possit recipere bona ecclesiarum, etiam invito papa, translated Cary J. Nederman, in Political thought in early fourteenth-century England: treatises by Walter of Milemete, William of Pagula, and William of Ockham (Tempe, Arizona: Arizona Center for Medieval and Renaissance Studies, 2002)
- A translation of William of Ockham's Work of Ninety Days, translated by John Kilcullen and John Scott (Lewiston, New York: E. Mellen Press, 2001) [translation of Opus nonaginta dierum]
- On the Power of Emperors and Popes, translated by Annabel S. Brett (Bristol, 1998)
- Rega Wood, Ockham on the Virtues (West Lafayette, Indiana: Purdue University Press, 1997) [includes translation of On the Connection of the Virtues]
- A Letter to the Friars Minor, and Other Writings, translated by John Kilcullen (Cambridge: Cambridge University Press, 1995) [includes translation of Epistola ad Fratres Minores; some chapters of the Work of Ninety Days; some chapters of the Dialogus; and Eight Questions, Q.3, ]
- A Short Discourse on the Tyrannical Government, translated by John Kilcullen (Cambridge: Cambridge University Press, 1992) [translation of Breviloquium de principatu tyrannico]
- Dialogus [translation of the whole work, except for chapters translated in A Letter to the Friars Minor]
- William of Ockham, [Question One of] Eight Questions on the Power of the Pope, translated by Jonathan Robinson

== In fiction ==
William of Ockham served as an inspiration for the creation of William of Baskerville, the main character of Umberto Eco's novel The Name of the Rose (although Ockham is also mentioned as a separate character to, and a friend of, Baskerville), and is the main character of La Abadía del Crimen (The Abbey of Crime), a video game based upon said novel.

In the movie Star Trek VI: The Undiscovered Country, Spock claims that “an ancestor” of his is responsible for Occam’s Razor.

== See also ==
- Gabriel Biel
- Philotheus Boehner
- List of Catholic clergy scientists
- List of scholastic philosophers
- Ernest Addison Moody
- Ockham algebra
- Oxford Franciscan school
- Rule according to higher law
- Terminism
