= The Mirror of Alchimy =

Alchemical manual ascribed to Roger Bacon

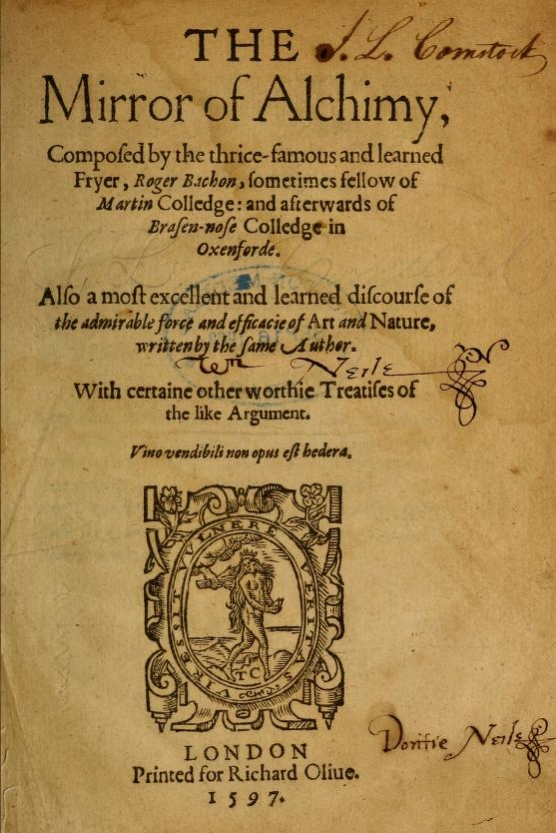
Title page of the 1597 edition of The Mirror of Alchimy.

The Mirror of Alchimy is a short alchemical manual, known in Latin as Speculum Alchemiae. Translated in 1597, it was only the second alchemical text printed in the English language. Long ascribed to Roger Bacon (1214-1294), the work is more likely the product of an anonymous author who wrote between the thirteenth and the fifteenth centuries.

== History ==
The Mirror of Alchimy is a translation of earlier works found in Latin and French. The earliest known manuscript copy is in Latin and dates from the fifteenth century. It was published as Speculum Alchemiae in Johannes Petreius' De alchimia. This was the first alchemical compendium, and was printed in Nuremberg in 1541. The volume also included five works attributed to Geber, the works of Calid and Ortolanus, and three other texts.

Portions of De alchimia were translated into French in 1557 as Le miroir d'alquimie. The French volume was published in four parts. Speculum Alchemiae was translated by Nicolas Bernard and appears in French at the beginning of part one. Here, Pseudo-Bacon's work is featured alongside the texts attributed to Hortulanus and Calid from the Latin edition. The series also included a second work attributed to Roger Bacon, De l'admirable puissance del'art, & de nature, ou est traicté de la pierre philosophale. Three additional works attributed to Jean de Mehun, Claude Celestin, and Pope John XXII were also incorporated.

The English version of The Mirror of Alchimy was translated from the French and printed at London in 1597. Just three of the appended texts found in Le miroir d'alquimie were retained for the English book. The work was printed by Thomas Creede (fl. 1593-1617) for the publisher Richard Olive.

In 1602, the Latin version of Speculum Alchemiae appeared in Volume II of the influential Theatrum Chemicum.

== Contents ==
On the title page the publisher describes the book as "The mirror of alchimy, composed by the thrice-famous and learned fryer, Roger Bachon. Also a most excellent and learned discourse of the admirable force and efficacie of Art and Nature, written by the same Author. With certain other worthie treatises of the like argument." In the first chapter pseudo-Bacon describes alchemy as "a science teaching how to make and compound a certain medicine, which is called Elixir, the which when it is cast upon metals or imperfect bodies, does fully perfect them in the very projection." The author then describes the seven metals and the method for creating the elixir.

It is a short treatise broken into seven chapters, some of which are only a paragraph long:

1. Of The Definitions Of Alchemy
2. Of The Natural Principles, And Procreation Of Minerals
3. Out Of What Things The Matter Of Elixir Must Be More Nearly Extracted
4. Of The Manner Of Working, And Of Moderating, And Continuing The Fire
5. Of The Quality Of The Vessel And Furnace
6. Of The Accidental And Essential Colours Appearing In The Work
7. How To Make Projection Of The Medicine Upon Any Imperfect Body

The following alchemical writings are appended to Pseudo-Bacon's tract in the 1597 edition:

- The Commentary of Hortulanus, upon the Smaragdine table of Hermes, the father of Philosophers.
- The Booke of the Secrets of Alchimie, composed by Galid the sonne of Yazich. (See: Khalid Ibn Yazid)
- An excellent discourse of the admirable force and efficacie of Art and Nature, written by the famous Frier Roger Bacon. (The connection of the historical Roger Bacon to this text is also suspect.)

== Influence ==
The Mirror of Alchimy appeared at a time when there was an explosion of interest in Bacon, magic and alchemy in England. The evidence of this is seen in popular plays of the time such as Marlowe's Dr. Faustus (c. 1588), Greene's Friar Bacon and Friar Bungay (1589), and Jonson's The Alchemist (1610). It was one of only two alchemy books printed in English in the sixteenth century, preceded by George Ripley's The Compound of Alchymy in 1591. Alchemical texts were previously available in sixteenth century England, but only in Latin or manuscript form.

Stanton Linden writes that the description of exoteric alchemy found in this widely distributed text defined the discipline as "Corporal Science" and reinforced its longstanding association with metallurgy and goldsmithing.

About this work, John Maxson Stillman wrote that "there is nothing in it that is characteristic of Roger Bacon's style or ideas, nor that distinguishes it from many unimportant alchemical lucubrations of anonymous writers of the thirteenth to the sixteenth centuries". M. M. Pattison Muir had a similar opinion, and Edmund Oscar von Lippmann considered this text a pseudepigraph.

== See also ==
- Alchemy
- Roger Bacon
- Emerald Tablet
- Theatrum Chemicum
- George Ripley (alchemist)
- Pseudepigraph
- History of chemistry
