= John Stillman =

John Stillman may refer to:

- Jack Wrangler (John Robert Stillman, 1946–2009), American pornographic film actor, theatrical producer, and director and writer
- John Stillman (judge) (1833–1883), American lawyer, businessman and teacher
- John Maxson Stillman (1852–1923), pioneer of the history of science in the United States
- John Stillman (architect), founded Stillman & Eastwick-Field Partnership
- John Stillman (Cold Case), a fictional character in the CBS crime drama Cold Case
