= Roger Bacon =

English polymath, philosopher and friar (c.1219/20–c.1292)

Roger Bacon OFM
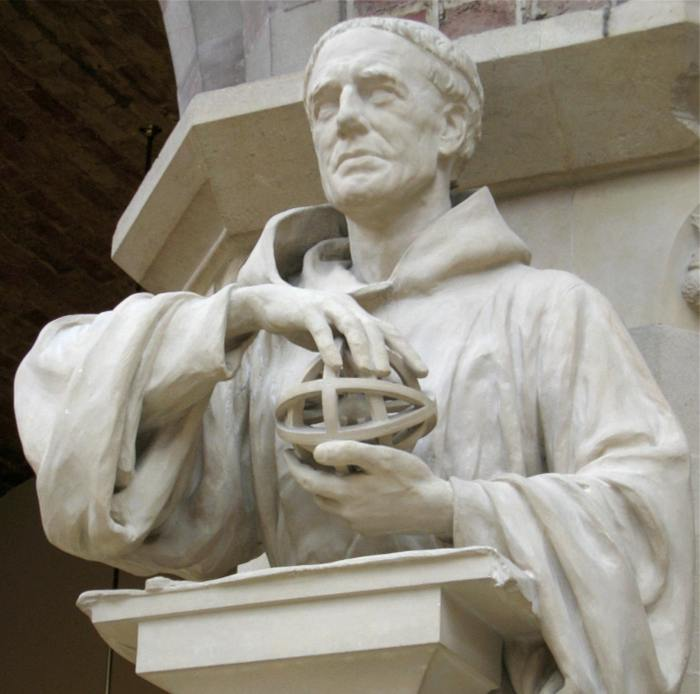
- Statue of Bacon at the Oxford University Museum of Natural History
- Born: c. 1219/20 near Ilchester, Somerset, England
- Died: c. 1292 (aged about 72/73) near Oxford, Oxfordshire, England
- Other name: Doctor Mirabilis

Education
- Education: University of Oxford
- Academic advisor: Adam Marsh

Philosophical work
- Era: Medieval philosophy
- Region: Western philosophy
- School: Scholasticism
- Main interests: Theology; Natural philosophy, Natural sciences, Chemistry, Biology, engineering, Mathematics, Astronomy
- Notable ideas: Experimental science

Roger Bacon (/ˈbeɪkən/; Latin: Rogerus or Rogerius Baconus, Baconis, also Frater Rogerus; c. 1219/20 – c. 1292), also known by the scholastic accolade Doctor Mirabilis, was a medieval English polymath, philosopher, scientist, theologian and Franciscan friar who placed considerable emphasis on the study of nature through empiricism. Intertwining his Catholic faith with scientific thinking, Roger Bacon is considered one of the greatest polymaths of the medieval period.

In the early modern era, he was regarded as a wizard and particularly famed for the story of his mechanical or necromantic brazen head. He is credited as one of the earliest European advocates of the modern scientific method, along with his teacher Robert Grosseteste. Bacon applied the empirical method of Ibn al-Haytham (Alhazen) to observations in texts attributed to Aristotle. Bacon discovered the importance of empirical testing when the results he obtained were different from those that would have been predicted by Aristotle.

21st-century re-evaluations emphasise that Bacon was essentially a medieval thinker, with much of his "experimental" knowledge obtained from books in the scholastic tradition. He was, however, partially responsible for a revision of the medieval university curriculum, which saw the addition of optics to the traditional quadrivium.

Bacon's major work, the Opus Majus, was sent to Pope Clement IV in Rome in 1267 upon the pope's request. Although gunpowder was first invented and described in China, Bacon was the first in Europe to record its formula. His linguistic work has been heralded for its early exposition of a universal grammar.

== Life ==
Roger Bacon was born in Ilchester in Somerset, England, in the early 13th century. His birth is sometimes narrowed down to 1210, 1213 or 1214, 1215 or 1220. The only source for his birth date is a statement from his 1267 Opus Tertium that "forty years have passed since I first learned the Alphabetum". The latest dates assume this referred to the alphabet itself, but elsewhere in the Opus Tertium it is clear that Bacon uses the term to refer to rudimentary studies, the trivium or quadrivium that formed the medieval curriculum. His family appears to have been well off.

Bacon studied at Oxford. (Note: Bacon has been claimed as an alumnus by both Merton and Brasenose, despite having attended before the establishment of the collegiate system.) While Robert Grosseteste had probably left shortly before Bacon's arrival, his work and legacy almost certainly influenced the young scholar and it is possible Bacon subsequently visited him and William of Sherwood in Lincoln. Bacon became a Master at Oxford, lecturing on Aristotle. There is no evidence he was ever awarded a doctorate. (The title Doctor Mirabilis was a posthumous scholastic accolade.) A caustic cleric named Roger Bacon is recorded speaking before the king at Oxford in 1233.

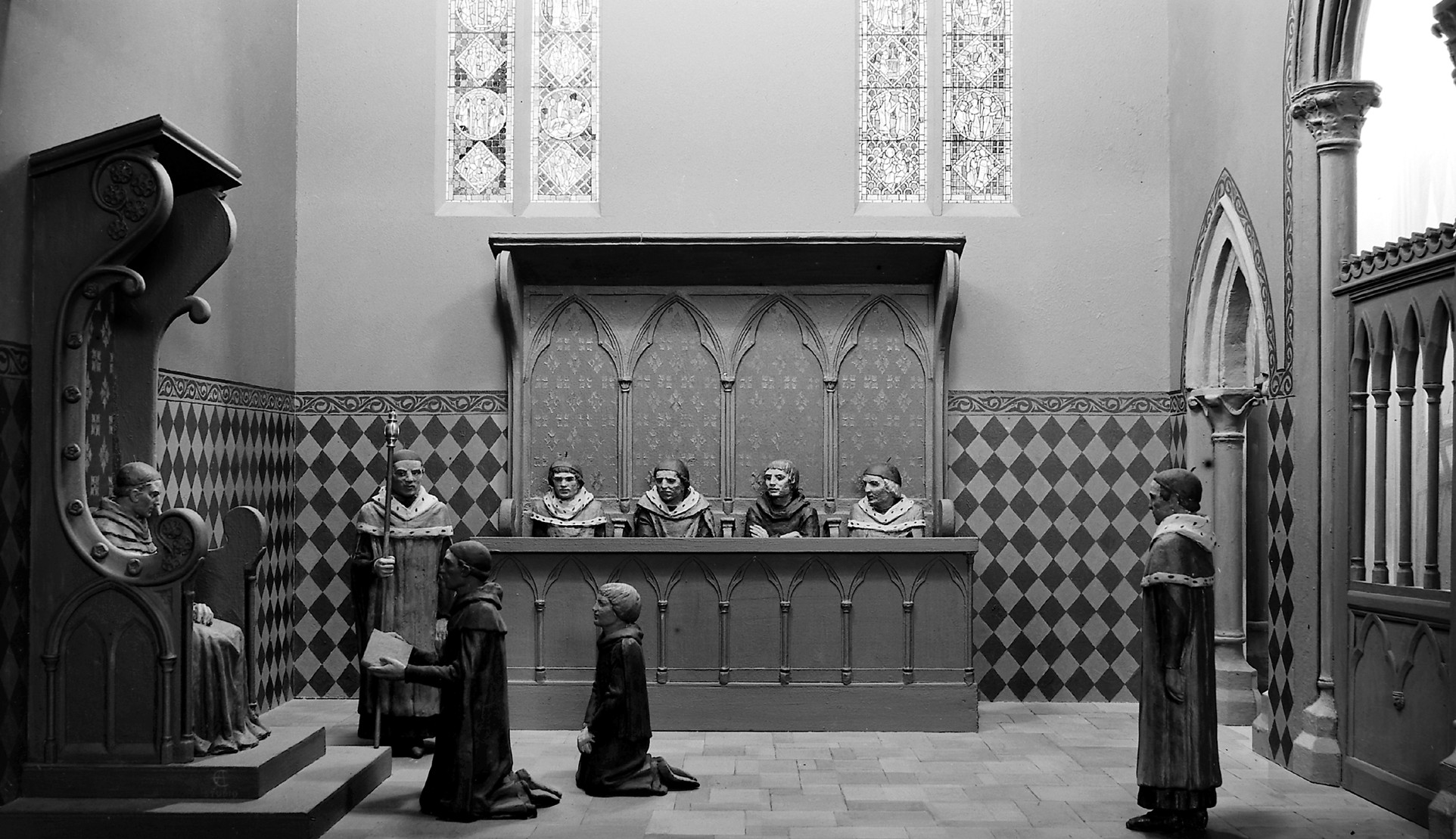
A diorama of Bacon presenting one of his works to the chancellors of Paris University

In 1237 or at some point in the following decade, he accepted an invitation to teach at the University of Paris. While there, he lectured on Latin grammar, Aristotelian logic, arithmetic, geometry, and the mathematical aspects of astronomy and music. His faculty colleagues included Robert Kilwardby, Albertus Magnus, and Peter of Spain, who later became Pope as Pope John XXI. The Cornishman Richard Rufus was a scholarly opponent. In 1247 or soon after, he left his position in Paris.

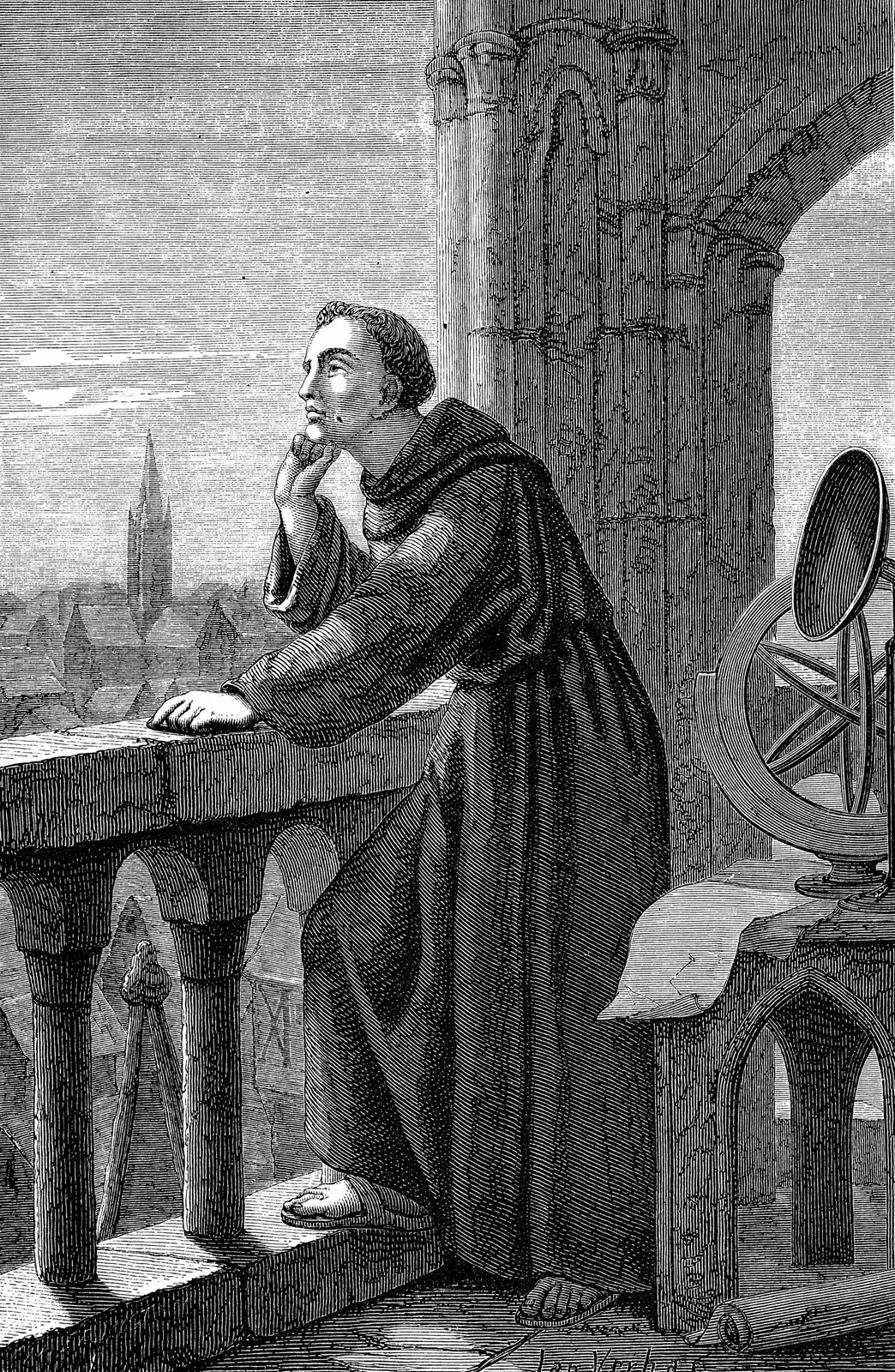
A 19th-century engraving of Bacon observing the stars at Oxford

As a private scholar, his whereabouts for the next decade are uncertain but he was likely in Oxford c. 1248–1251, where he met Adam Marsh, and in Paris in 1251. He seems to have studied most of the known Greek and Arabic works on optics (then known as "perspective", perspectiva). A passage in the Opus Tertium states that at some point he took a two-year break from his studies.

By the late 1250s, resentment against the king's preferential treatment of his émigré Poitevin relatives led to a coup and the imposition of the Provisions of Oxford and Westminster, instituting a baronial council and more frequent parliaments. Pope Urban IV absolved the king of his oath in 1261 and, after initial abortive resistance, Simon de Montfort led a force, enlarged due to recent crop failures, that prosecuted the Second Barons' War. Bacon's own family were considered royal partisans: De Montfort's men seized their property (Note: Though probably granting it to a partisan of their own cause, rather than razing it to the ground as is sometimes reported.) and drove several members into exile.

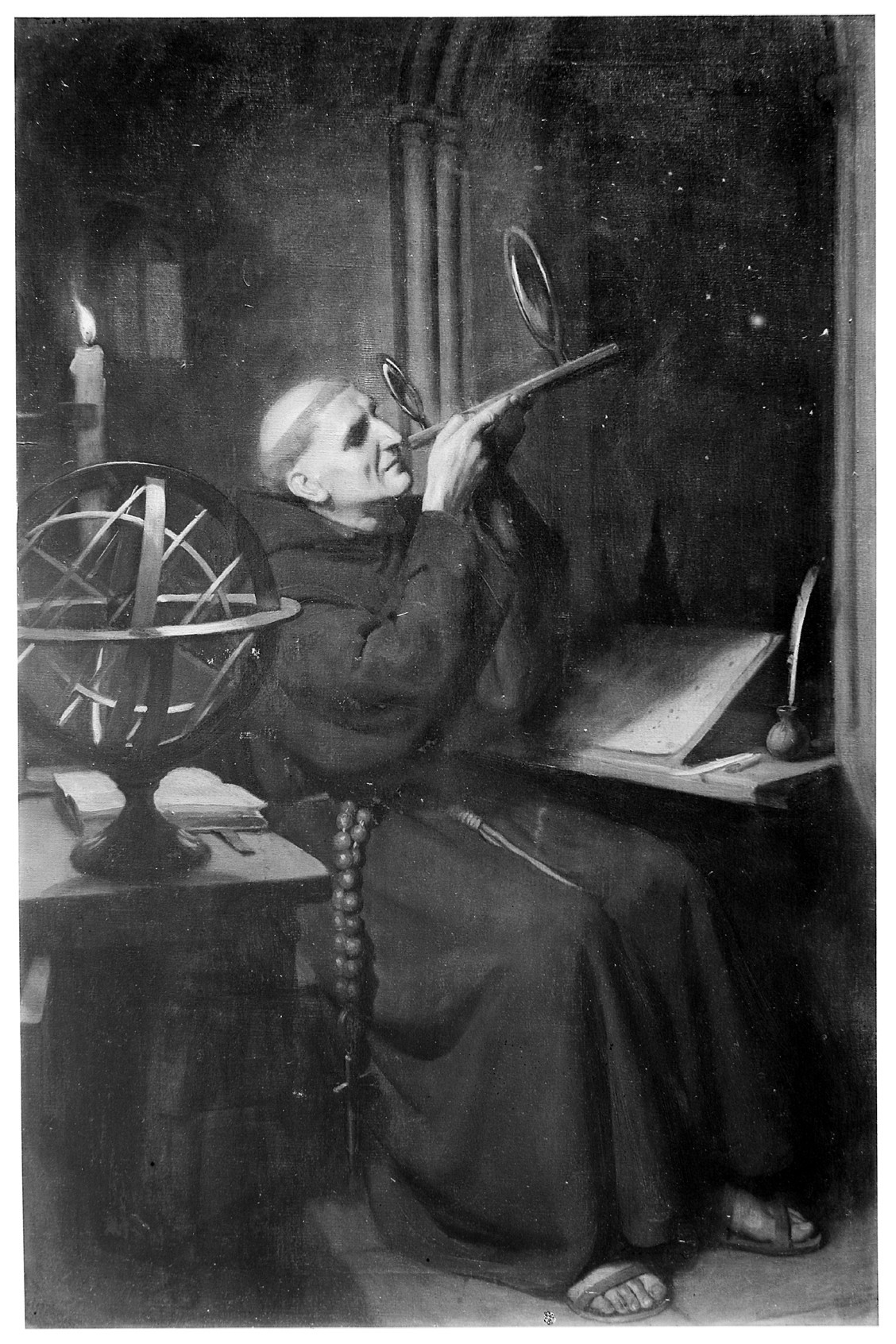
Ernest Board's portrayal of Bacon in his observatory at Merton College

In 1256 or 1257, he became a friar in the Franciscan Order in either Paris or Oxford, following the example of scholarly English Franciscans such as Grosseteste and Marsh. After 1260, Bacon's activities were restricted by a statute prohibiting the friars of his order from publishing books or pamphlets without prior approval. He was likely kept at constant menial tasks to limit his time for contemplation and came to view his treatment as an enforced absence from scholarly life.

By the mid-1260s, he was undertaking a search for patrons who could secure permission and funding for his return to Oxford. For a time, Bacon was finally able to get around his superiors' interference through his acquaintance with Guy de Foulques, bishop of Narbonne, cardinal of Sabina, and the papal legate who negotiated between England's royal and baronial factions.

In 1263 or 1264, a message garbled by Bacon's messenger, Raymond of Laon, led Guy to believe that Bacon had already completed a summary of the sciences. In fact, he had no money to research, let alone copy, such a work and attempts to secure financing from his family were thwarted by the Second Barons' War. However, in 1265, Guy was summoned to a conclave at Perugia that elected him Pope Clement IV. William Benecor, who had previously been the courier between Henry III and the pope, now carried the correspondence between Bacon and Clement. Clement's reply of 22 June 1266 commissioned "writings and remedies for current conditions", instructing Bacon not to violate any standing "prohibitions" of his order but to carry out his task in utmost secrecy.

While faculties of the time were largely limited to addressing disputes on the known texts of Aristotle, Clement's patronage permitted Bacon to engage in a wide-ranging consideration of the state of knowledge in his era. In 1267 or '68, Bacon sent the Pope his Opus Majus, which presented his views on how to incorporate Aristotelian logic and science into a new theology, supporting Grosseteste's text-based approach against the "sentence method" then fashionable.

Bacon also sent his Opus Minus, De Multiplicatione Specierum, De Speculis Comburentibus, an optical lens, and possibly other works on alchemy and astrology. (Note: It is still uncertain whether the Opus Tertium was sent with the others or kept for further revision and development.) The entire process has been called "one of the most remarkable single efforts of literary productivity", with Bacon composing referenced works of around a million words in about a year.

Pope Clement died in 1268 and Bacon lost his protector. The Condemnations of 1277 banned the teaching of certain philosophical doctrines, including deterministic astrology. Some time within the next two years, Bacon was apparently imprisoned or placed under house arrest. This was traditionally ascribed to Franciscan Minister General Jerome of Ascoli, probably acting on behalf of the many clergy, monks, and educators attacked by Bacon's 1271 Compendium Studii Philosophiae.

Modern scholarship, however, notes that the first reference to Bacon's "imprisonment" dates from eighty years after his death on the charge of unspecified "suspected novelties" and finds it less than credible. Contemporary scholars who do accept Bacon's imprisonment typically associate it with Bacon's "attraction to contemporary prophesies", his sympathies for "the radical 'poverty' wing of the Franciscans", interest in certain astrological doctrines, or generally combative personality rather than from "any scientific novelties which he may have proposed".

Sometime after 1278, Bacon returned to the Franciscan House at Oxford, where he continued his studies and is presumed to have spent most of the remainder of his life. His last dateable writing—the Compendium Studii Theologiae—was completed in 1292. He seems to have died shortly afterwards and been buried at Oxford.

== Work ==
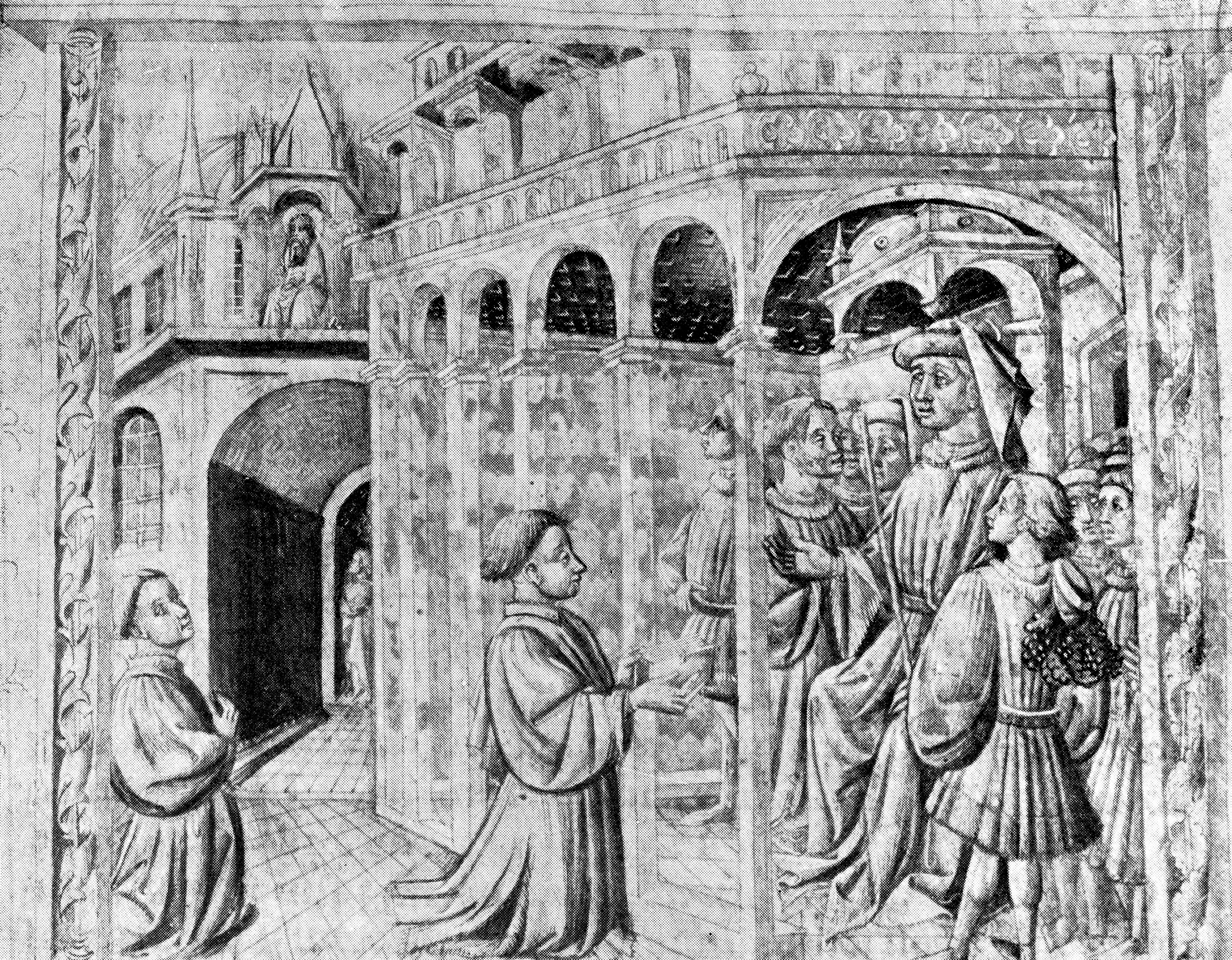
A manuscript illustration of Bacon presenting one of his works to the chancellor of the University of Paris

Medieval European philosophy often relied on appeals to the authority of Church Fathers such as St Augustine, and on works by Plato and Aristotle only known at second hand or through Latin translations. By the 13th century, new works and better versions – in Arabic or in new Latin translations from the Arabic – began to trickle north from Muslim Spain. In Roger Bacon's writings, he upholds Aristotle's calls for the collection of facts before deducing scientific truths, against the practices of his contemporaries, arguing that "thence cometh quiet to the mind".

Bacon also called for reform with regard to theology. He argued that, rather than training to debate minor philosophical distinctions, theologians should focus their attention primarily on the Bible itself, learning the languages of its original sources thoroughly. He was fluent in several of these languages and was able to note and bemoan several corruptions of scripture, and of the works of the Greek philosophers that had been mistranslated or misinterpreted by scholars working in Latin. He also argued for the education of theologians in science ("natural philosophy") and its addition to the medieval curriculum.

=== Opus Majus ===
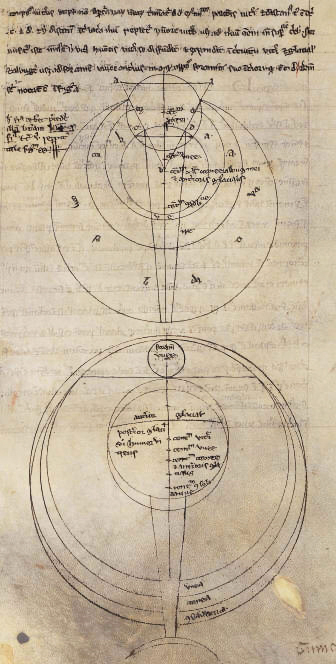
Optic studies by Bacon

Bacon's 1267 Greater Work, the Opus Majus, (Note: In his works, Bacon also refers to it as his "primary writing" (scriptum principale).) contains treatments of mathematics, optics, alchemy, and astronomy, including theories on the positions and sizes of the celestial bodies. It is divided into seven sections: "The Four General Causes of Human Ignorance" (Causae Erroris), "The Affinity of Philosophy with Theology" (Philosophiae cum Theologia Affinitas), "On the Usefulness of Grammar" (De Utilitate Grammaticae), "The Usefulness of Mathematics in Physics" (Mathematicae in Physicis Utilitas), "On the Science of Perspective" (De Scientia Perspectivae), "On Experimental Knowledge" (De Scientia Experimentali), and "A Philosophy of Morality" (Moralis Philosophia).

It was not intended as a complete work but as a "persuasive preamble" (persuasio praeambula), an enormous proposal for a reform of the medieval university curriculum and the establishment of a kind of library or encyclopedia, bringing in experts to compose a collection of definitive texts on these subjects. The new subjects were to be "perspective" (i.e., optics), "astronomy" (inclusive of astronomy proper, astrology, and the geography necessary to use them), "weights" (likely some treatment of mechanics but this section of the Opus Majus has been lost), alchemy, agriculture (inclusive of botany and zoology), medicine, and "experimental science", a philosophy of science that would guide the others. The section on geography was allegedly originally ornamented with a map based on ancient and Arabic computations of longitude and latitude, but has since been lost. His (mistaken) arguments supporting the idea that dry land formed the larger proportion of the globe were apparently similar to those which later guided Columbus.

In this work Bacon criticises his contemporaries Alexander of Hales and Albertus Magnus, who were held in high repute despite having only acquired their knowledge of Aristotle at second hand during their preaching careers. Albert was received at Paris as an authority equal to Aristotle, Avicenna and Averroes, a situation Bacon decried: "never in the world [had] such monstrosity occurred before".

In Part I of the Opus Majus Bacon recognises some philosophers as the Sapientes, or gifted few, and saw their knowledge in philosophy and theology as superior to the vulgus philosophantium, or common herd of philosophers. He held Islamic thinkers between 1210 and 1265 in especially high regard calling them "both philosophers and sacred writers" and defended the integration of philosophy from apostate philosopher of the Islamic world into Christian learning.

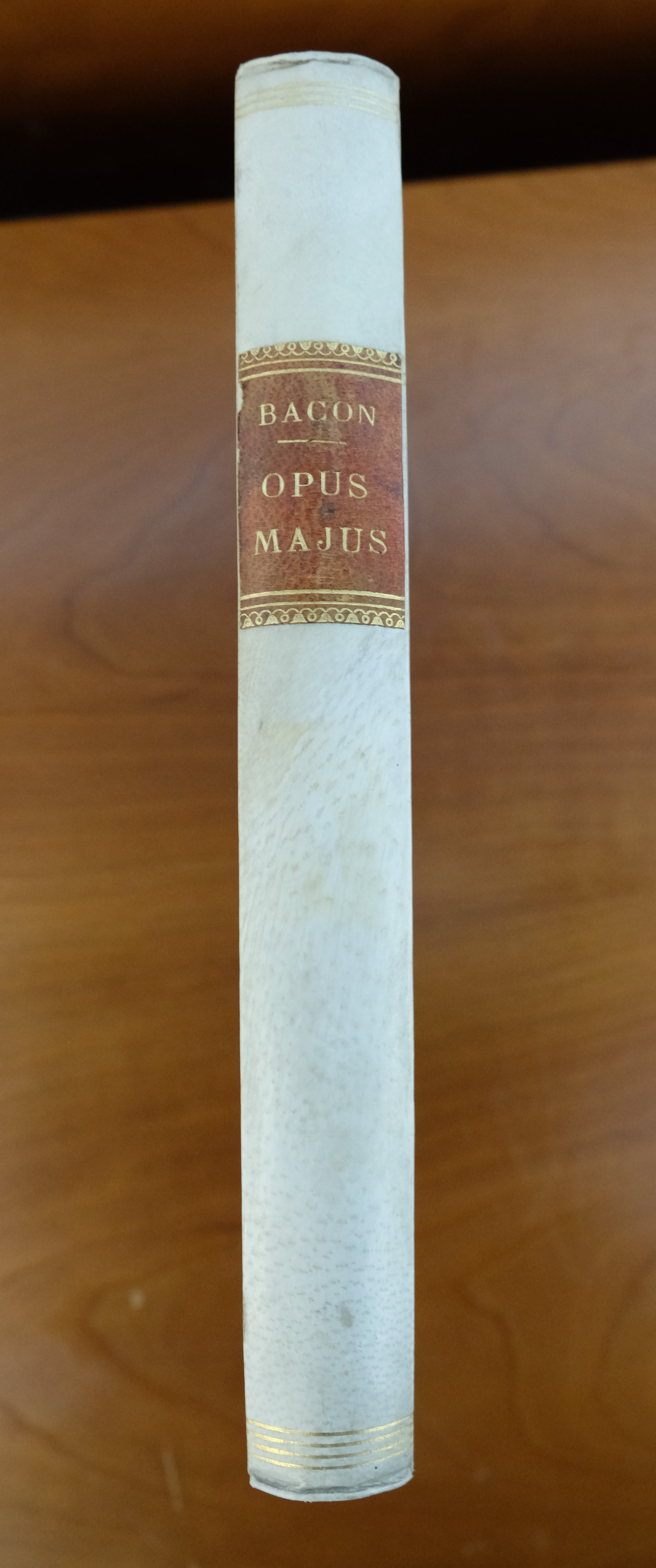
Spine of a 1750 edition of Opus majus

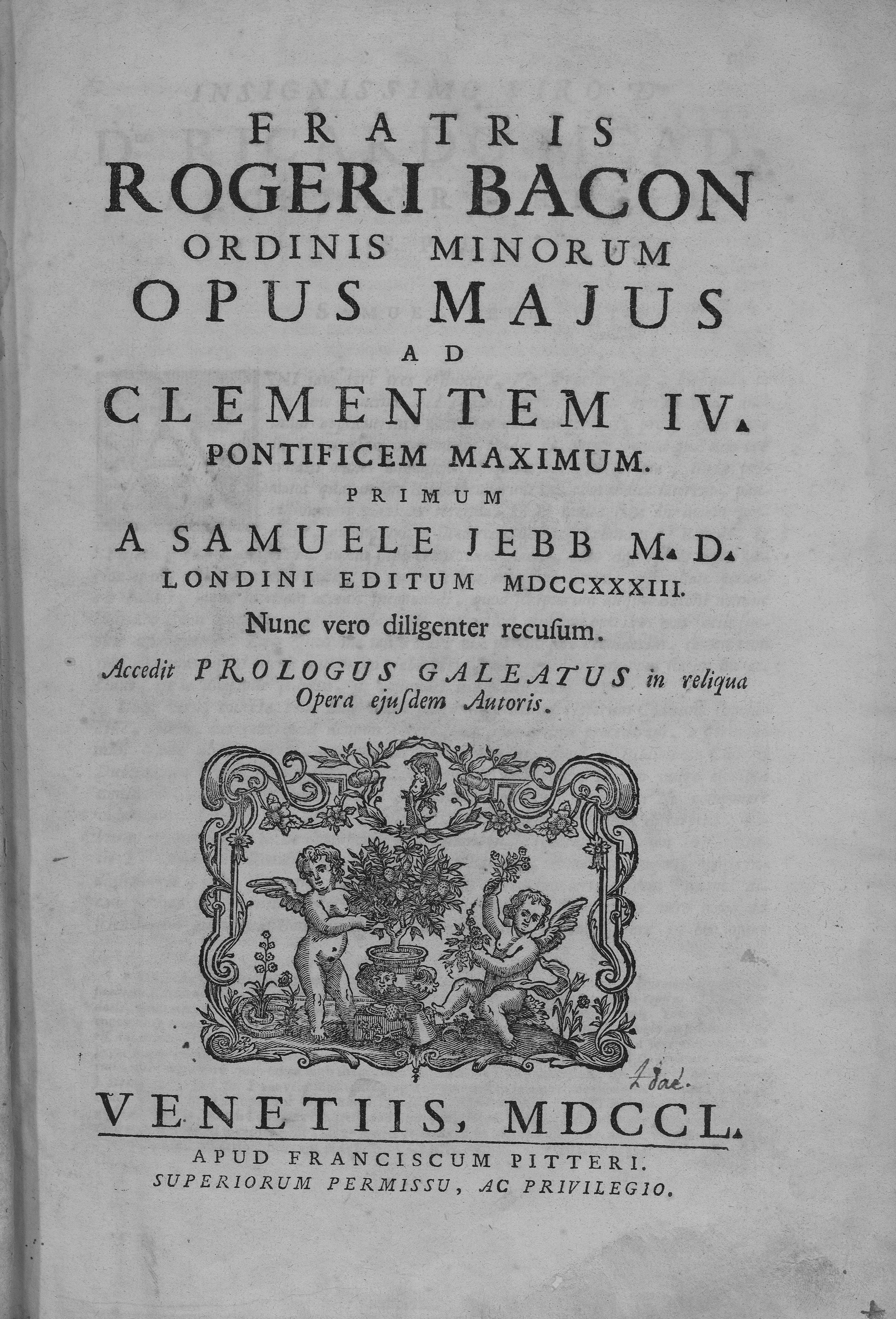
Title page of 1750 edition of Opus majus

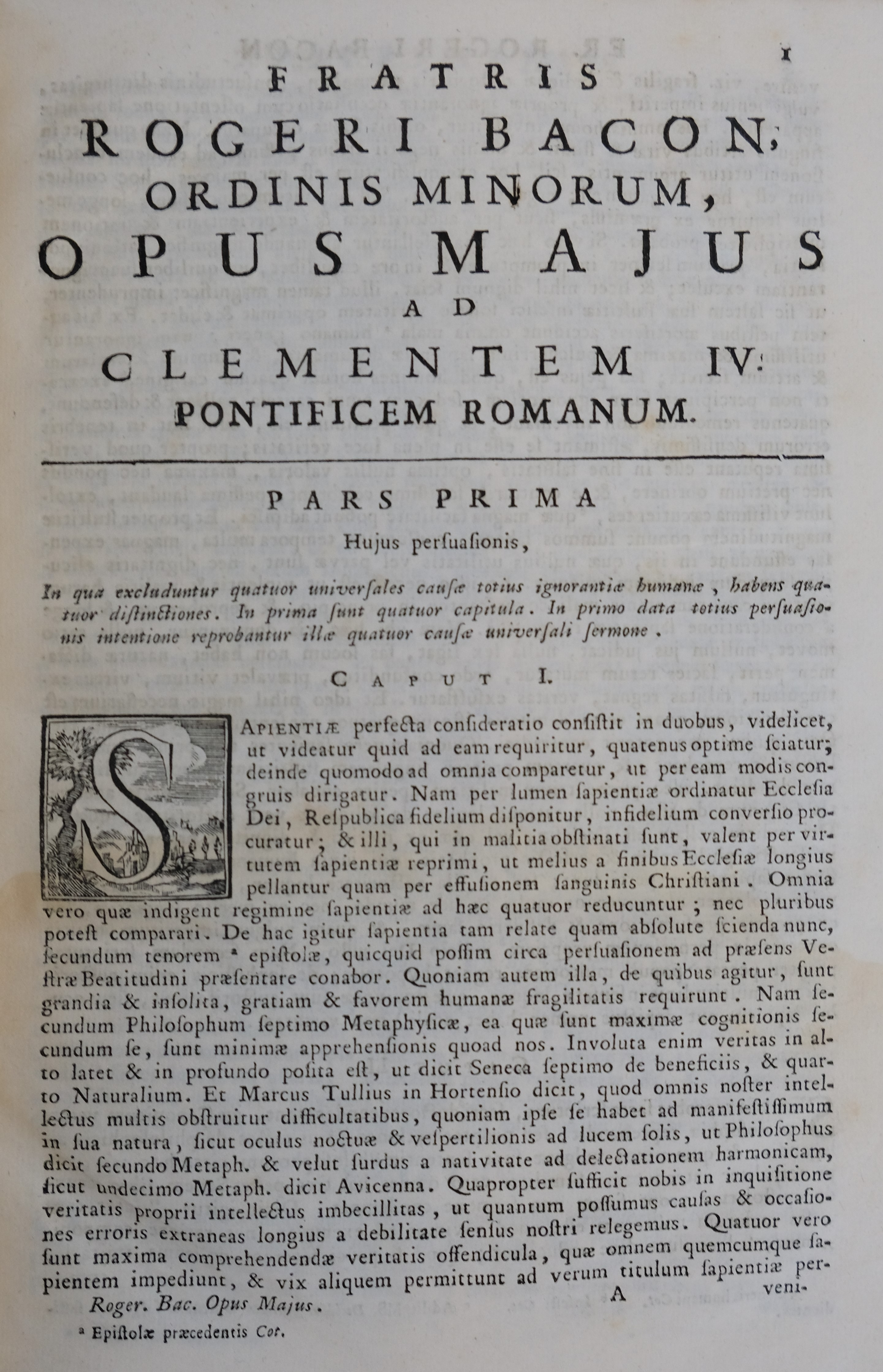
First page of 1750 edition of Opus majus

==== Calendrical reform ====
In Part IV of the Opus Majus, Bacon proposed a calendrical reform similar to the later system introduced in 1582 under Pope Gregory XIII. Drawing on ancient Greek and medieval Islamic astronomy recently introduced to western Europe via Spain, Bacon continued the work of Robert Grosseteste and criticised the then-current Julian calendar as "intolerable, horrible, and laughable".

It had become apparent that Eudoxus and Sosigenes's assumption of a year of 365¼ days was, over the course of centuries, too inexact. Bacon charged that this meant the computation of Easter had shifted forward by 9 days since the First Council of Nicaea in 325. His proposal to drop one day every 125 years and to cease the observance of fixed equinoxes and solstices was not acted upon following the death of Pope Clement IV in 1268. The eventual Gregorian calendar drops one day from the first three centuries in each set of 400 years.

==== Optics ====
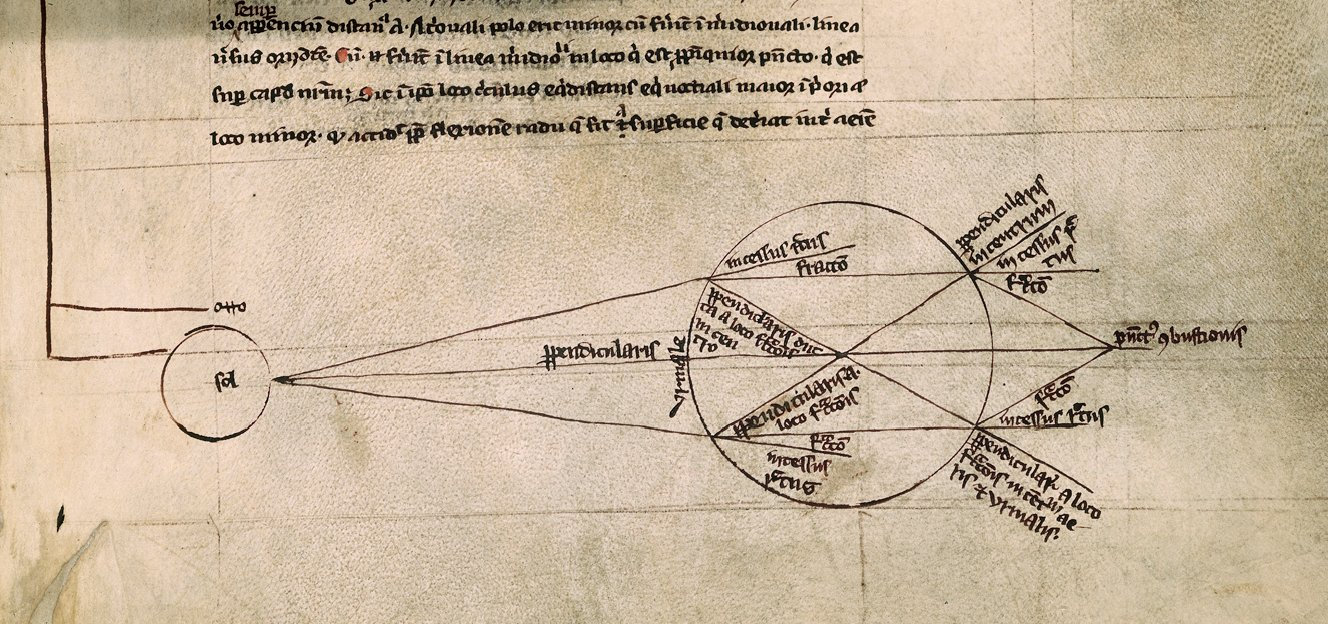
Bacon's diagram of light being refracted by a spherical container of water

In Part V of the Opus Majus, Bacon discusses physiology of eyesight and the anatomy of the eye and the brain, considering light, distance, position, and size, direct and reflected vision, refraction, mirrors, and lenses. His treatment was primarily oriented by the Latin translation of Alhazen's Book of Optics. He also draws heavily on Eugene of Palermo's Latin translation of the Arabic translation of Ptolemy's Optics; on Robert Grosseteste's work based on Al-Kindi's Optics; and, through Alhazen (Ibn al-Haytham), on Ibn Sahl's work on dioptrics.

==== Gunpowder ====
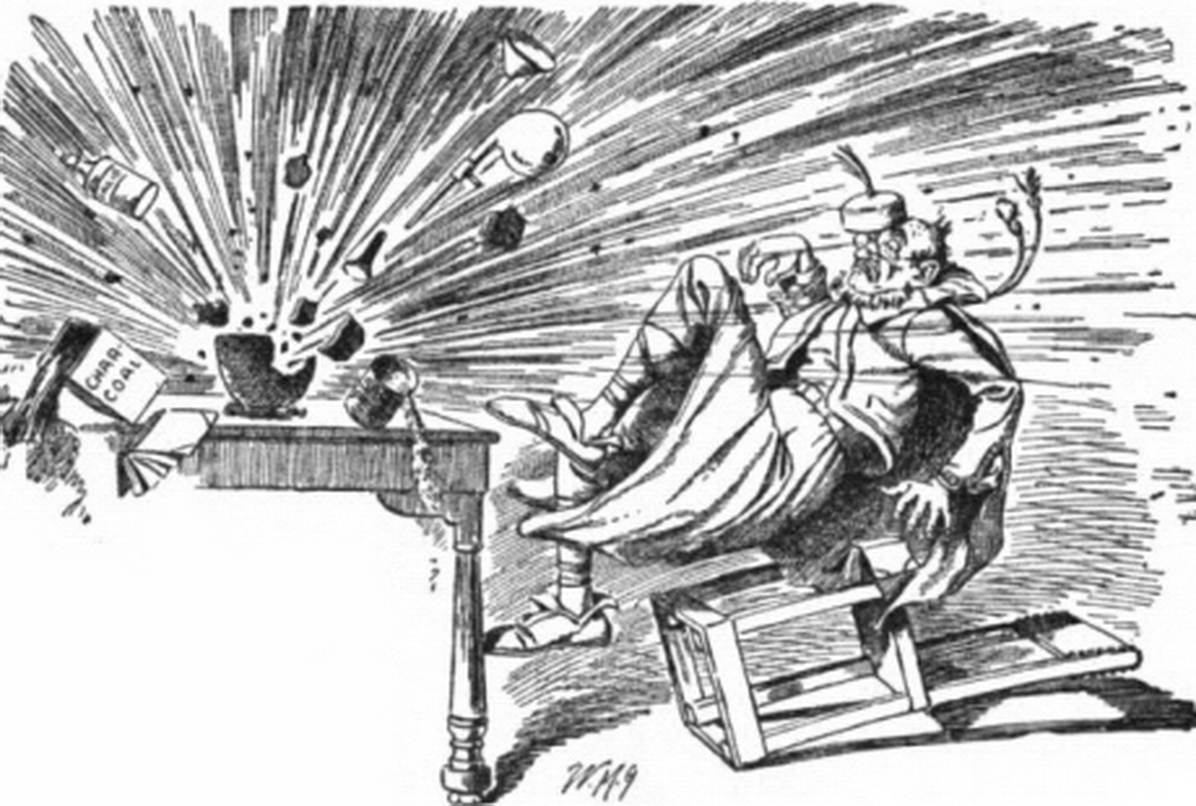
"Roger Bacon discovers gunpowder", "whereby Guy Fawkes was made possible", an image from Bill Nye's Comic History of England

A passage in the Opus Majus and another in the Opus Tertium are usually taken as the first European descriptions of a mixture containing the essential ingredients of gunpowder. Partington and others have come to the conclusion that Bacon most likely witnessed at least one demonstration of Chinese firecrackers, possibly obtained by Franciscans—including Bacon's friend William of Rubruck—who visited the Mongol Empire during this period. (Note: "Europeans were prompted by all this to take a closer interest in happenings far to the east. Four years after the invasion of 1241, the pope sent an ambassador to the Great Khan's capital in Mongolia. Other travellers followed later, of whom the most interesting was William of Rubruck (or Ruysbroek). He returned in 1257, and in the following year there are reports of experiments with gunpowder and rockets at Cologne. Then a friend of William of Rubruck, Roger Bacon, gave the first account of gunpowder and its use in fireworks to be written in Europe. A form of gunpowder had been known in China since before AD 900, and as mentioned earlier ... Much of this knowledge had reached the Islamic countries by then, and the saltpetre used in making gunpowder there was sometimes referred to, significantly, as 'Chinese snow'.") The most telling passage reads:

We have an example of these things (that act on the senses) in [the sound and fire of] that children's toy which is made in many [diverse] parts of the world; i.e. a device no bigger than one's thumb. From the violence of that salt called saltpetre [together with sulphur and willow charcoal, combined into a powder] so horrible a sound is made by the bursting of a thing so small, no more than a bit of parchment [containing it], that we find [the ear assaulted by a noise] exceeding the roar of strong thunder, and a flash brighter than the most brilliant lightning.

At the beginning of the 20th century, Henry William Lovett Hime of the Royal Artillery published the theory that Bacon's Epistola contained a cryptogram giving a recipe for the gunpowder he witnessed. The theory was criticised by Thorndike in a 1915 letter to Science and several books, a position joined by Muir, John Maxson Stillman, Steele, and Sarton. Needham et al. concurred with these earlier critics that the additional passage did not originate with Bacon and further showed that the proportions supposedly deciphered (a 7:5:5 ratio of saltpetre to charcoal to sulphur) as not even useful for firecrackers, burning slowly with a great deal of smoke and failing to ignite inside a gun barrel. The ~41% nitrate content is too low to have explosive properties.

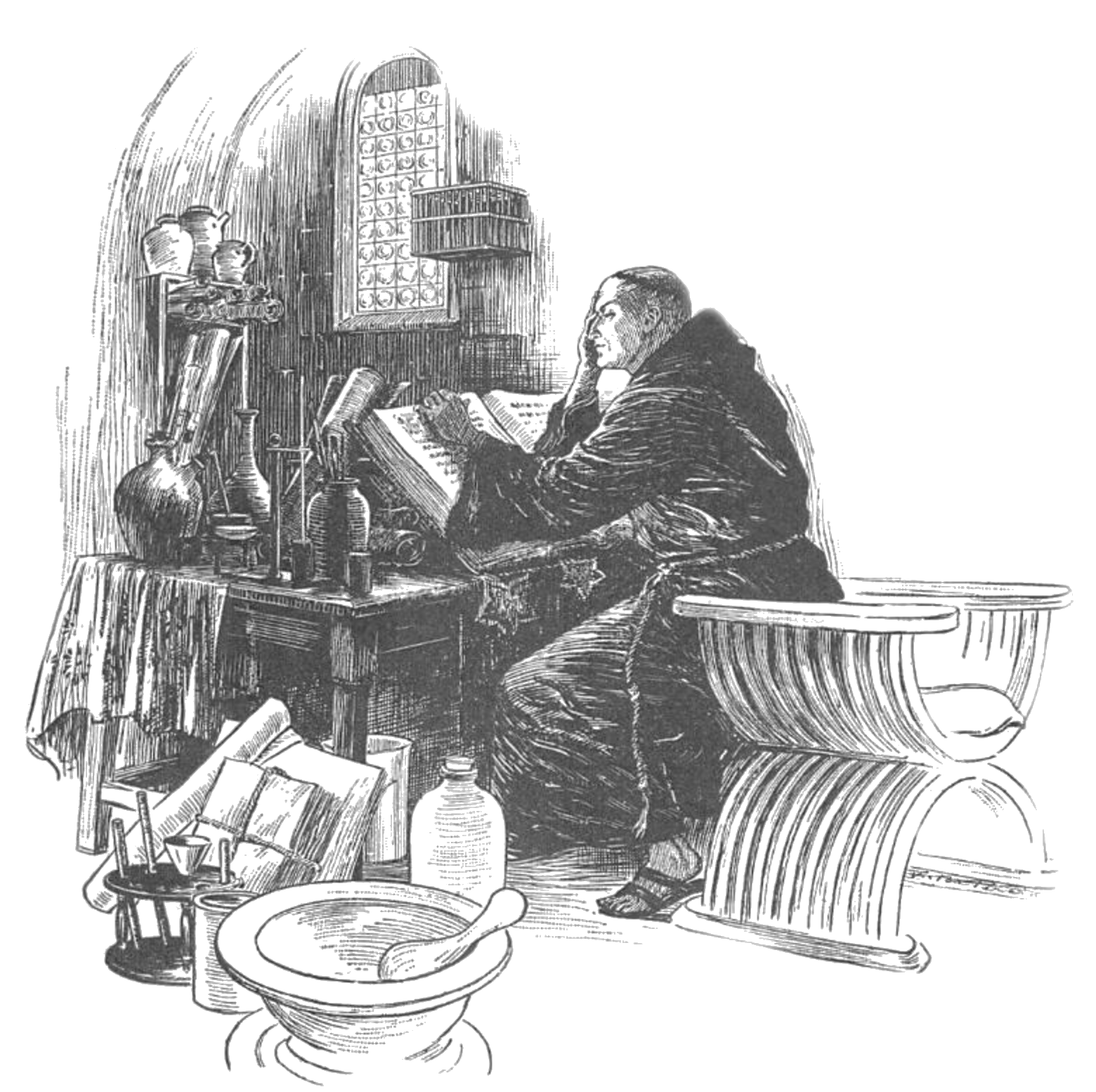
Friar Bacon in his study

=== Secret of Secrets ===
Bacon attributed the Secret of Secrets (Secretum Secretorum) (Arabic: Sirr al-ʿasrar), to Aristotle, thinking that he had composed it for Alexander the Great. Bacon produced an edition of Philip of Tripoli's Latin translation, complete with his own introduction and notes; and his writings of the 1260s and 1270s cite it far more than his contemporaries did. This led Easton and others, including Robert Steele, to argue that the text spurred Bacon's own transformation into an experimentalist. (Bacon never described such a decisive impact himself.) The dating of Bacon's edition of the Secret of Secrets is a key piece of evidence in the debate, with those arguing for a greater impact giving it an earlier date; but it certainly influenced the elder Bacon's conception of the political aspects of his work in the sciences.

=== Alchemy ===
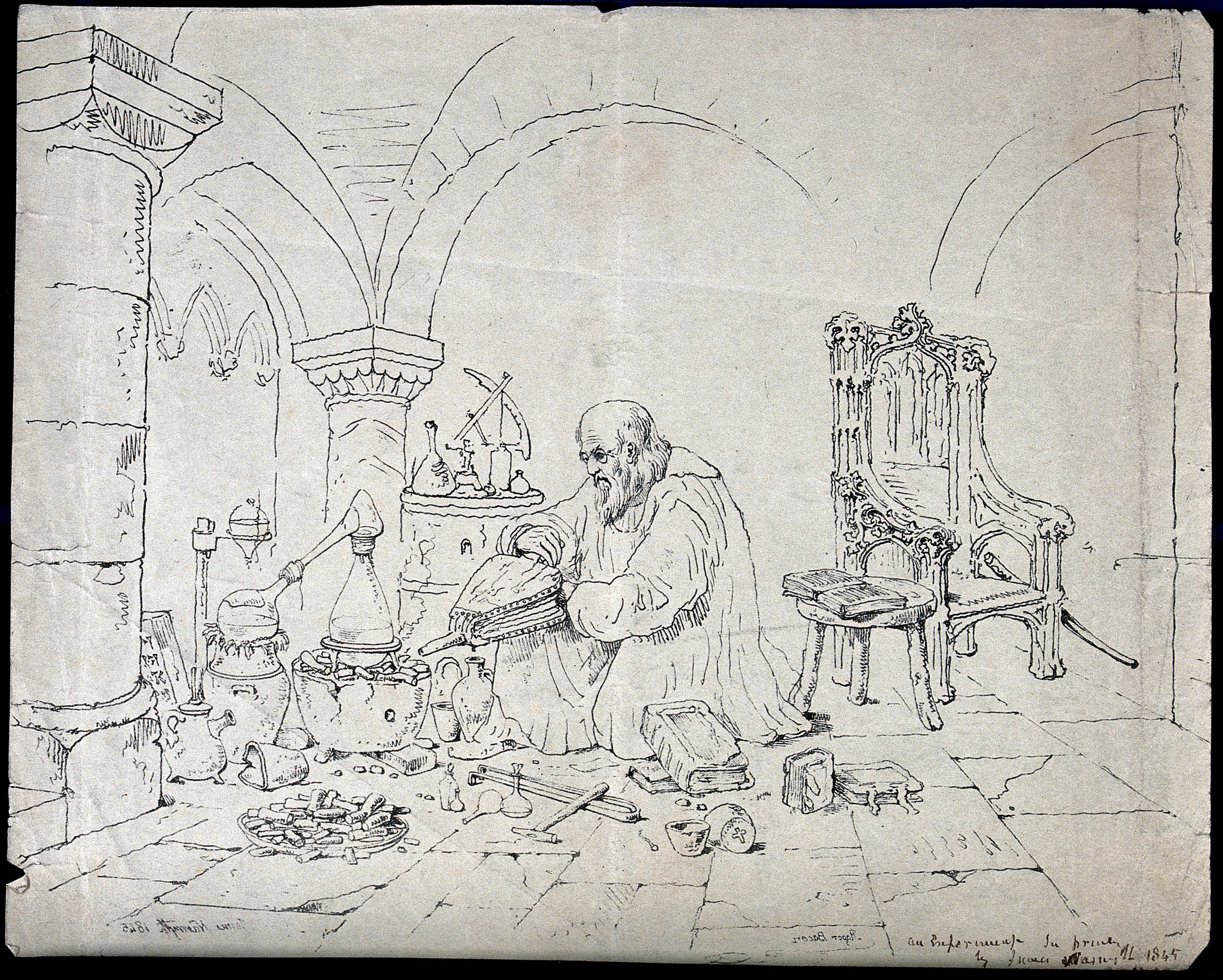
A 19th-century etching of Bacon conducting an alchemical experiment

Bacon has been credited with a number of alchemical texts.

The Letter on the Secret Workings of Art and Nature and on the Vanity of Magic (Epistola de Secretis Operibus Artis et Naturae et de Nullitate Magiae), also known as On the Wonderful Powers of Art and Nature (De Mirabili Potestate Artis et Naturae), a likely-forged letter to an unknown "William of Paris", dismisses practices such as necromancy but contains most of the alchemical formulae attributed to Bacon, including one for a philosopher's stone and another possibly for gunpowder. It also includes several passages about hypothetical flying machines and submarines, attributing their first use to Alexander the Great. On the Vanity of Magic or The Nullity of Magic is a debunking of esoteric claims in Bacon's time, showing that they could be explained by natural phenomena.

He wrote on the medicine of Galen, referring to the translations of Avicenna. He believed that the medicine of Galen belonged to an ancient tradition passed through Chaldeans, Greeks and Arabs. Although he provided a negative image of Hermes Trismegistus, his work was influenced by Hermetic thought. Bacon's endorsement of Hermetic philosophy is evident, as his citations of the alchemical literature known as the Secretum Secretorum made several appearances in the Opus Majus. The Secretum Secretorum contains knowledge about the Hermetic Emerald Tablet, which was an integral component of alchemy, thus proving that Bacon's version of alchemy was much less secular, and much more spiritual than once interpreted. The importance of Hermetic philosophy in Bacon's work is also evident through his citations of classic Hermetic literature such as the Corpus Hermeticum. Bacon's citation of the Corpus Hermeticum, which consists of a dialogue between Hermes and the pagan deity Asclepius, proves that Bacon's ideas were much more in line with the spiritual aspects of alchemy rather than the scientific aspects. However, this is somewhat paradoxical as what Bacon was specifically trying to prove in the Opus Majus and subsequent works, was that spirituality and science were the same entity. Bacon believed that by using science, certain aspects of spirituality such as the attainment of "Sapientia" or "Divine Wisdom" could be logically explained using tangible evidence. Bacon's Opus Majus was first and foremost, a compendium of sciences which he believed would facilitate the first step towards "Sapientia". Bacon placed considerable emphasis on alchemy and even went so far as to state that alchemy was the most important science. The reason why Bacon kept the topic of alchemy vague for the most part, is due to the need for secrecy about esoteric topics in England at the time as well as his dedication to remaining in line with the alchemical tradition of speaking in symbols and metaphors.

=== Linguistics ===
Bacon's early linguistic and logical works are the Overview of Grammar (Summa Grammatica), Summa de Sophismatibus et Distinctionibus, and the Summulae Dialectices or Summulae super Totam Logicam. These are mature but essentially conventional presentations of Oxford and Paris's terminist and pre-modist logic and grammar. His later work in linguistics is much more idiosyncratic, using terminology and addressing questions unique in his era.

In his Greek and Hebrew Grammars (Grammatica Graeca and Hebraica), in his work "On the Usefulness of Grammar" (Book III of the Opus Majus), and in his Compendium of the Study of Philosophy, Bacon stresses the need for scholars to know several languages. Europe's vernacular languages are not ignored—he considers them useful for practical purposes such as trade, proselytism, and administration—but Bacon is mostly interested in his era's languages of science and religion: Arabic, Greek, Hebrew and Latin.

Bacon is less interested in a full practical mastery of the other languages than on a theoretical understanding of their grammatical rules, ensuring that a Latin reader will not misunderstand passages' original meaning. For this reason, his treatments of Greek and Hebrew grammar are not isolated works on their topic but contrastive grammars treating the aspects which influenced Latin or which were required for properly understanding Latin texts. He pointedly states, "I want to describe Greek grammar for the benefit of Latin speakers". (Note: Latin: Cupiens igitur exponere gramaticam grecam ad vtilitatem latinorum.) It is likely only this limited sense which was intended by Bacon's boast that he could teach an interested pupil a new language within three days. (Note: It has been claimed that the copies of Bacon's grammars which have survived was not their final form, but Hovdhaugen considers that—even if that were the case—the final form would have been similar in scope to the surviving texts and mostly focused on improving a Latinate reader's understanding of texts in translation.)

Passages in the Overview and the Greek grammar have been taken as an early exposition of a universal grammar underlying all human languages. The Greek grammar contains the tersest and most famous exposition:

Grammar is one and the same in all languages, substantially, though it may vary, accidentally, in each of them. (Note: Latin: ...grammatica vna et eadem est secundum substanciam in omnibus linguis, licet accidentaliter varietur....)

However, Bacon's lack of interest in studying a literal grammar underlying the languages known to him and his numerous works on linguistics and comparative linguistics has prompted Hovdhaugen to question the usual literal translation of Bacon's grammatica in such passages. She notes the ambiguity in the Latin term, which could refer variously to the structure of language, to its description, and to the science underlying such descriptions: i.e., linguistics.

=== Other works ===
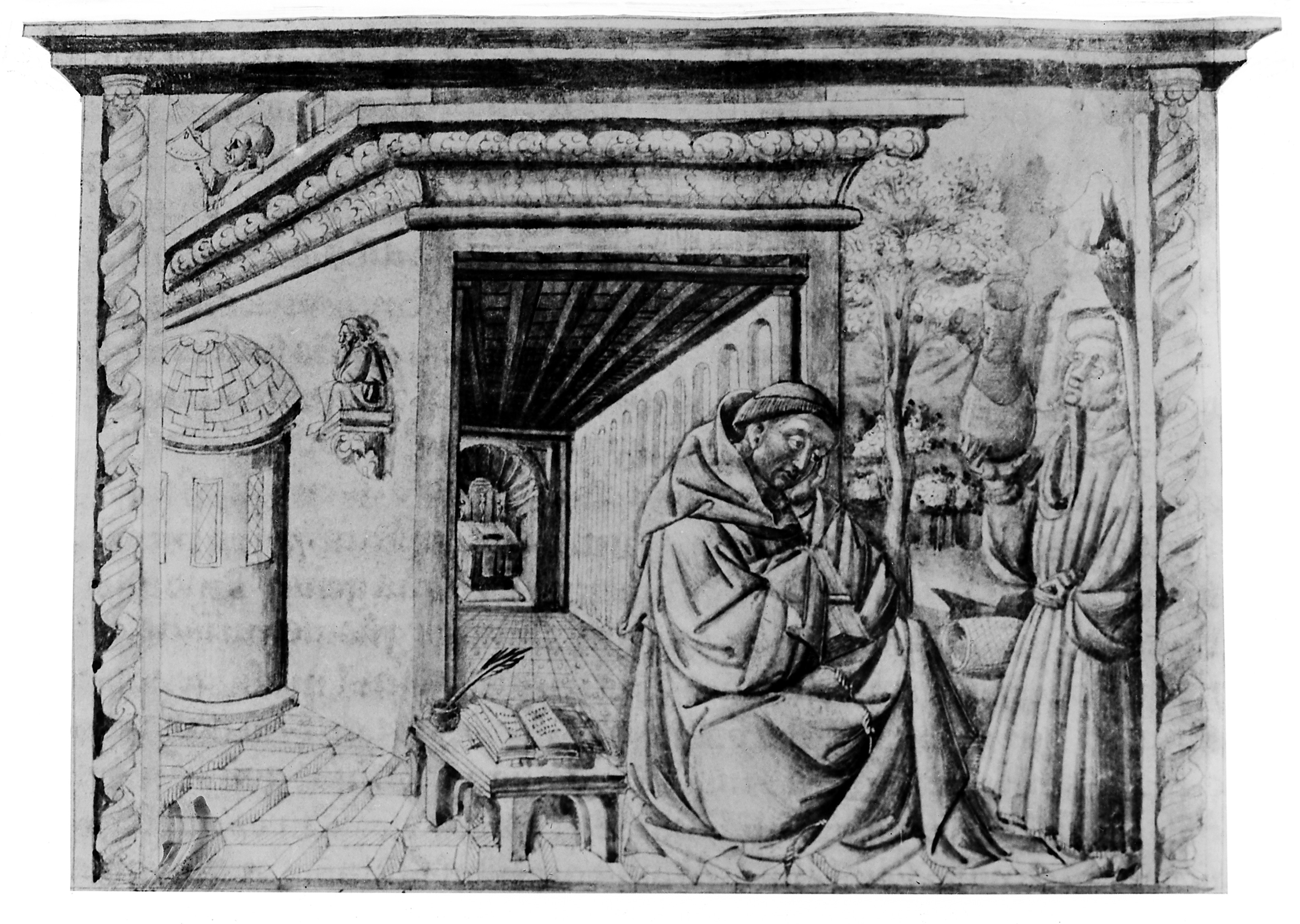
A portrait of Roger Bacon from a 15th-century edition of De Retardatione

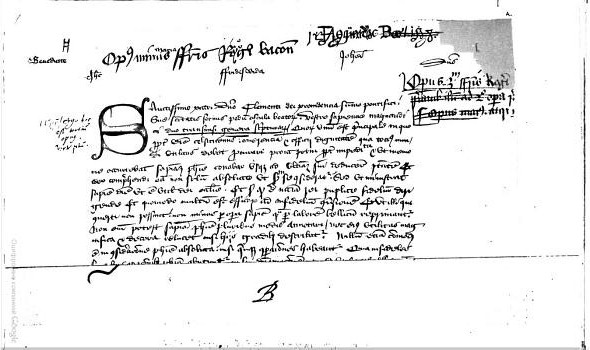
The first page of the letter from Bacon to Clement IV introducing his Opus Tertium

Bacon states that his Lesser Work (Opus Minus) and Third Work (Opus Tertium) were originally intended as summaries of the Opus Majus in case it was lost in transit. Easton's review of the texts suggests that they became separate works over the course of the laborious process of creating a fair copy of the Opus Majus, whose half-million words were copied by hand and apparently greatly revised at least once.

Other works by Bacon include his "Tract on the Multiplication of Species" (Tractatus de Multiplicatione Specierum), "On Burning Lenses" (De Speculis Comburentibus), the Communia Naturalium and Mathematica, the "Compendium of the Study of Philosophy" and "of Theology" (Compendium Studii Philosophiae and Theologiae), and his Computus. The "Compendium of the Study of Theology", presumably written in the last years of his life, was an anticlimax: adding nothing new, it is principally devoted to the concerns of the 1260s.

=== Apocrypha ===
The Mirror of Alchimy (Speculum Alchemiae), a short treatise on the origin and composition of metals, is traditionally credited to Bacon. It espouses the Arabian theory of mercury and sulphur forming the other metals, with vague allusions to transmutation. Stillman opined that "there is nothing in it that is characteristic of Roger Bacon's style or ideas, nor that distinguishes it from many unimportant alchemical lucubrations of anonymous writers of the thirteenth to the sixteenth centuries", and Muir and Lippmann also considered it a pseudepigraph.

The cryptic Voynich manuscript has been attributed to Bacon by various sources, including by its first recorded owner, but historians of science Lynn Thorndike and George Sarton dismissed these claims as unsupported, and the vellum of the manuscript has since been dated to the 15th century.

== Legacy ==
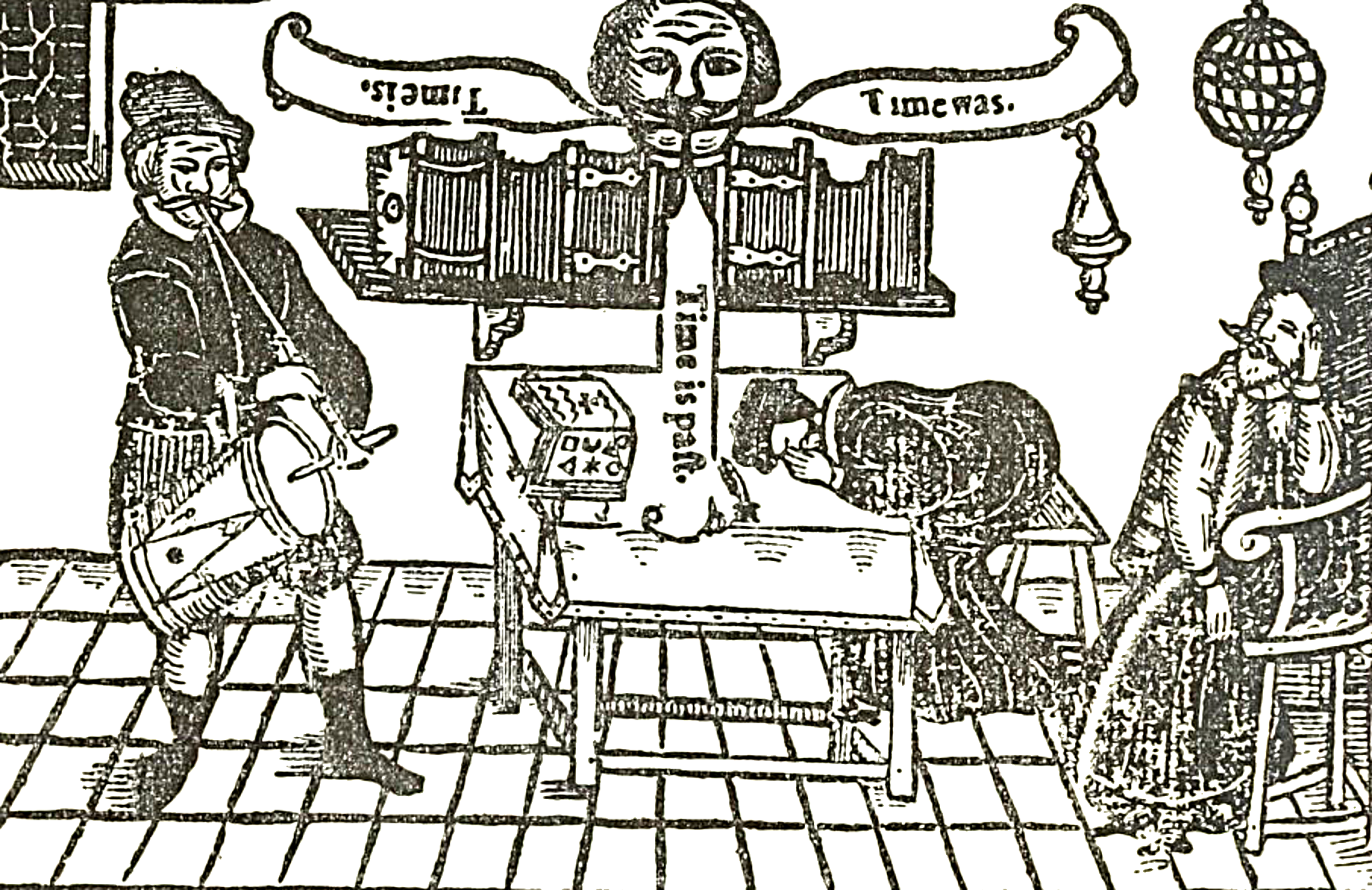
A woodcut from Robert Greene's play displaying the brazen head pronouncing "Time is. Time was. Time is past."

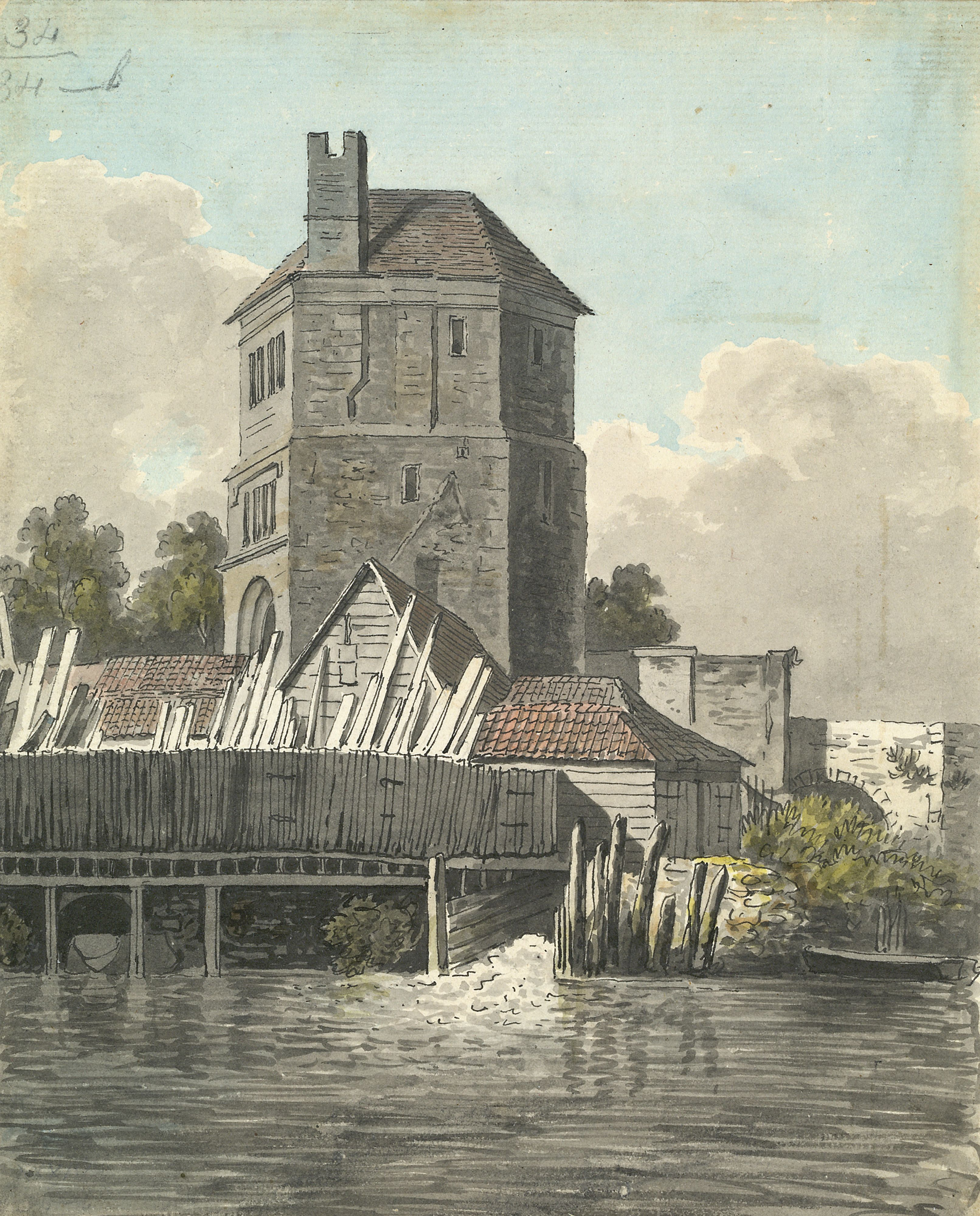
"Friar Bacon's Study" in Oxford. By the late 18th century this study on Folly Bridge had become a place of pilgrimage for scientists, but the building was pulled down in 1779 to allow for road widening.

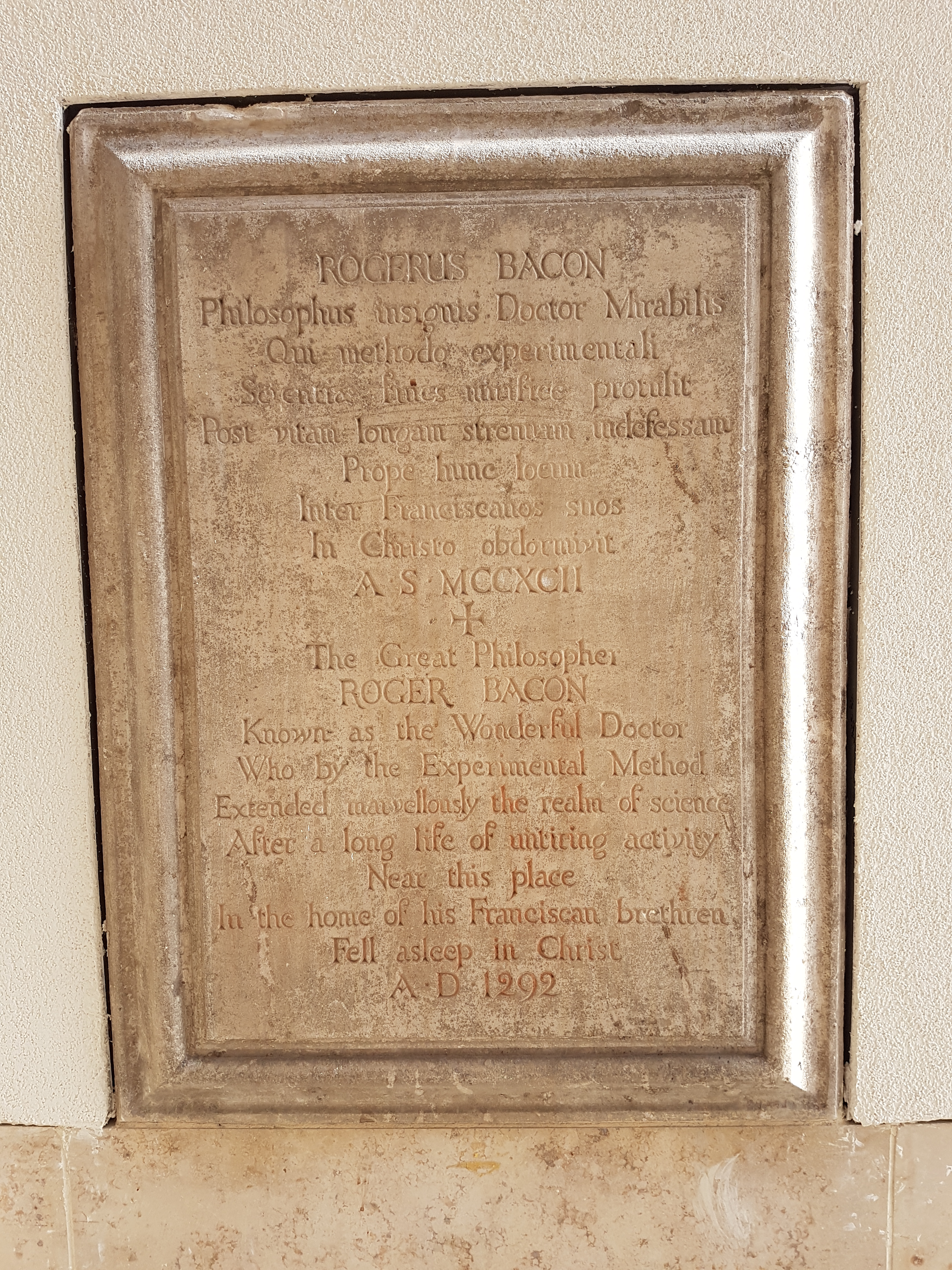
The Westgate plaque at Oxford

Bacon was largely ignored by his contemporaries in favour of other scholars such as Albertus Magnus, Bonaventure, and Thomas Aquinas, although his works were studied by Bonaventure, John Pecham, and Peter of Limoges, through whom he may have influenced Raymond Lull. He was also partially responsible for the addition of optics (perspectiva) to the medieval university curriculum.

By the early modern period, the English considered him the epitome of a wise and subtle possessor of forbidden knowledge, a Faust-like magician who had tricked the devil and so was able to go to heaven. Of these legends, one of the most prominent was that he created a talking brazen head which could answer any question. The story appears in the anonymous 16th-century account of The Famous Historie of Fryer Bacon, (Note: Although the manuscript was circulated in by c. 1555, it was not published until 1627. It was republished in the mid-19th century.) in which Bacon speaks with a demon but causes the head to speak by "the continuall fume of the six hottest Simples", testing his theory that speech is caused by "an effusion of vapors".

Around 1589, Robert Greene adapted the story for the stage as The Honorable Historie of Frier Bacon and Frier Bongay, one of the most successful Elizabethan comedies. As late as the 1640s, Thomas Browne was still complaining that "Every ear is filled with the story of Frier Bacon, that made a brazen head to speak these words, Time is". Greene's Bacon spent seven years creating a brass head that would speak "strange and uncouth aphorisms" to enable him to encircle Britain with a wall of brass that would make it impossible to conquer.

Unlike his source material, Greene does not cause his head to operate by natural forces but by "nigromantic charms" and "the enchanting forces of the devil": i.e., by entrapping a dead spirit or hobgoblin. Bacon collapses, exhausted, just before his device comes to life and announces "Time is", "Time was", and "Time is Past" before being destroyed in spectacular fashion: the stage direction instructs that "a lightening flasheth forth, and a hand appears that breaketh down the Head with a hammer".

A necromantic head was ascribed to Pope Sylvester II as early as the 1120s, (Note: Malmesbury even notes that "probably some may regard all this as a fiction, because the vulgar are used to undermine the fame of scholars, saying that the man who excels in any admirable science, holds converse with the devil" but professes himself willing to believe the stories about Sylvester because of the (spurious) accounts he had of the pope's "shameful end".) but Browne considered the legend to be a misunderstanding of a passage in Peter the Good's c. 1335 Precious Pearl where the negligent alchemist misses the birth of his creation and loses it forever. The story may also preserve the work by Bacon and his contemporaries to construct clockwork armillary spheres. Bacon had praised a "self-activated working model of the heavens" as "the greatest of all things which have been devised".

As early as the 16th century, natural philosophers such as Bruno, Dee and Francis Bacon were attempting to rehabilitate Bacon's reputation and to portray him as a scientific pioneer who had avoided the petty bickering of his contemporaries to attempt a rational understanding of nature. By the 19th century, commenters following Whewell considered that "Bacon ... was not appreciated in his age because he was so completely in advance of it; he is a 16th- or 17th-century philosopher, whose lot has been by some accident cast in the 13th century". His assertions in the Opus Majus that "theories supplied by reason should be verified by sensory data, aided by instruments, and corroborated by trustworthy witnesses" were (and still are) considered "one of the first important formulations of the scientific method on record".

This idea that Bacon was a modern experimental scientist reflected two views of the period: that the principal form of scientific activity is experimentation and that 13th-century Europe still represented the "Dark Ages". This view, which is still reflected in some 21st-century popular science books, (Note: E.g., Clegg's 2003 treatment of Roger Bacon, entitled The First Scientist.) portrays Bacon as an advocate of modern experimental science who emerged as a solitary genius in an age hostile to his ideas. Based on Bacon's apocrypha, he is also portrayed as a visionary who predicted the invention of the submarine, aircraft, and automobile. Consistent with this view of Bacon as a man ahead of his time, H. G. Wells's Outline of History attributes this prescient passage to him:

Machines for navigating are possible without rowers, so that great ships suited to river or ocean, guided by one man, may be borne with greater speed than if they were full of men. Likewise, cars may be made so that without a draught animal they may be moved cum impetu inaestimabili, as we deem the scythed chariots to have been from which antiquity fought. And flying machines are possible, so that a man may sit in the middle turning some device by which artificial wings may beat the air in the manner of a flying bird.

However, in the course of the 20th century, Husserl, Heidegger and others emphasised the importance to the modern science of Cartesian and Galilean projections of mathematics over sensory perceptions of nature; Heidegger, in particular, noted the lack of such an understanding in Bacon's works. Although Crombie, Kuhn and Schramm continued to argue for Bacon's importance to the development of "qualitative" areas of modern science, Duhem, Thorndike, Carton and Koyré emphasised the essentially medieval nature of Bacon's scientia experimentalis.

Research also established that Bacon was probably not as isolated—and not as persecuted—as was once thought. Many medieval sources of and influences on Bacon's scientific activity have been identified. In particular, Bacon often mentioned his debt to the work of Robert Grosseteste: his work on optics and the calendar followed Grosseteste's lead, as did his idea that inductively-derived conclusions should be submitted for verification through experimental testing.

Bacon noted of William of Sherwood that "nobody was greater in philosophy than he"; praised Peter of Maricourt (the author of "A Letter on Magnetism") and John of London as "perfect" mathematicians; Campanus of Novara (the author of works on astronomy, astrology, and the calendar) and a Master Nicholas as "good"; and acknowledged the influence of Adam Marsh and lesser figures. Some scholars have pushed back on his reputation as an isolated genius.

As a result, the picture of Bacon has changed. Bacon is now seen as part of his age: a leading figure in the beginnings of the medieval universities at Paris and Oxford but one joined in the development of the philosophy of science by Robert Grosseteste, William of Auvergne, Henry of Ghent, Albert Magnus, Thomas Aquinas, John Duns Scotus, and William of Ockham. Lindberg summarised:

Bacon was not a modern, out of step with his age, or a harbinger of things to come, but a brilliant, combative, and somewhat eccentric schoolman of the thirteenth century, endeavoring to take advantage of the new learning just becoming available while remaining true to traditional notions ... of the importance to be attached to philosophical knowledge".

A recent review of the many visions of Bacon across the ages says contemporary scholarship still neglects one of the most important aspects of his life and thought: his commitment to the Franciscan order.

His Opus majus was a plea for reform addressed to the supreme spiritual head of the Christian faith, written against a background of apocalyptic expectation and informed by the driving concerns of the friars. It was designed to improve training for missionaries and to provide new skills to be employed in the defence of the Christian world against the enmity of non-Christians and of the Antichrist. It cannot usefully be read solely in the context of the history of science and philosophy.

With regard to religion's influence on Bacon's philosophy, Charles Sanders Peirce noted, "To Roger Bacon, ... the schoolmen's conception of reasoning appeared only an obstacle to truth ... [but] Of all kinds of experience, the best, he thought, was interior illumination, which teaches many things about Nature which the external senses could never discover, such as the transubstantiation of bread." Later scholars have therefore viewed him as a proto-protestant.

In Oxford lore, Bacon is credited as the namesake of Folly Bridge for having been placed under house arrest nearby. Although this is probably untrue, it had formerly been known as "Friar Bacon's Bridge". Bacon is also honoured at Oxford by a plaque affixed to the wall of the Westgate shopping centre.

== In popular culture ==
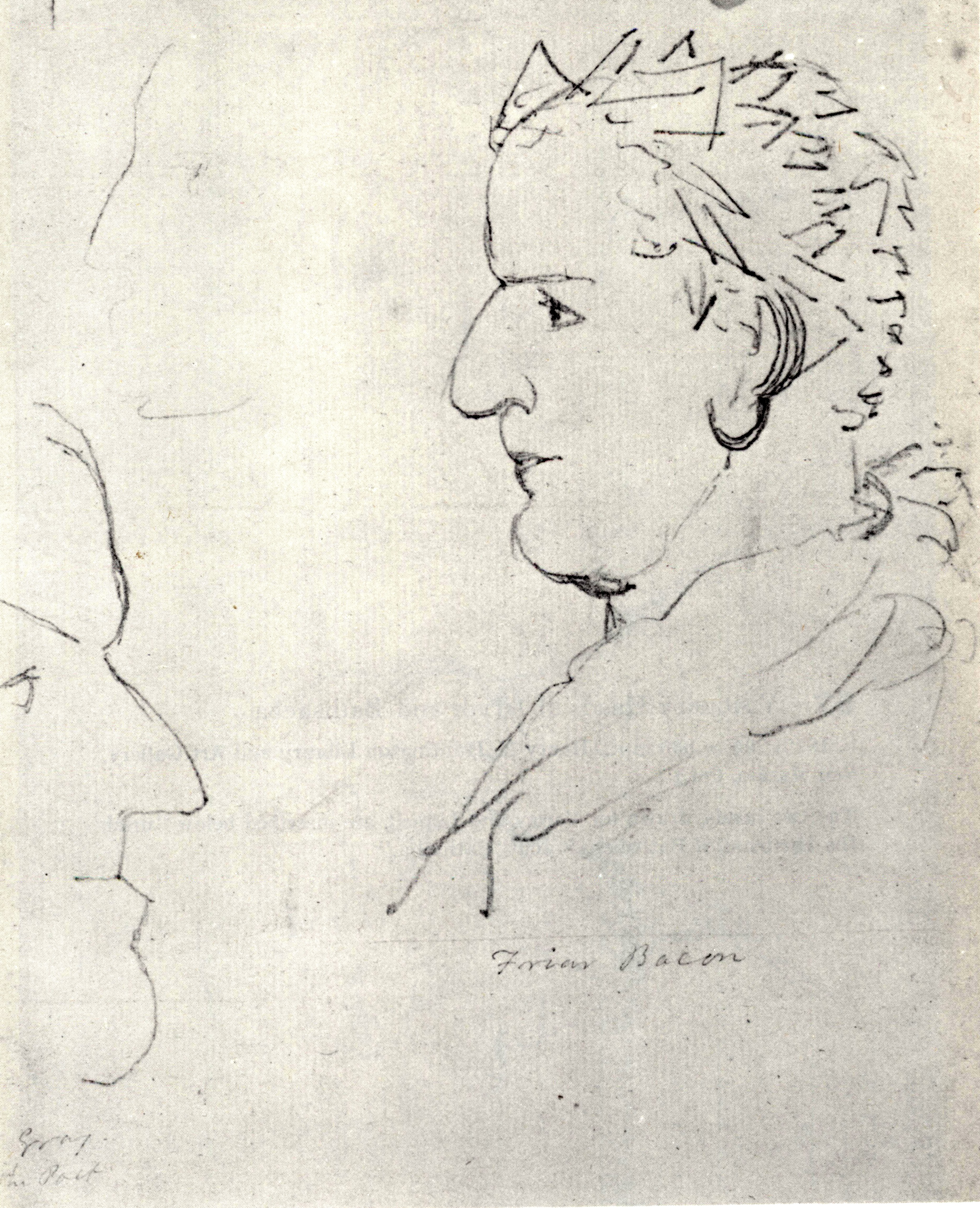
William Blake's visionary head of "Friar Bacon"

To commemorate the 700th anniversary of Bacon's approximate year of birth, Prof. J. Erskine wrote the biographical play A Pageant of the Thirteenth Century, which was performed and published by Columbia University in 1914. A fictionalised account of Bacon's life and times also appears in the second book of James Blish's After Such Knowledge trilogy, the 1964 Doctor Mirabilis. Bacon serves as a mentor to the protagonists of Thomas Costain's 1945 The Black Rose, and Umberto Eco's 1980 The Name of the Rose. Greene's play prompted a less successful sequel John of Bordeaux and was recast as a children's story for James Baldwin's 1905 Thirty More Famous Stories Retold. "The Brazen Head of Friar Bacon" also appears in Daniel Defoe's 1722 Journal of the Plague Year, Nathaniel Hawthorne's 1843 "The Birth-Mark" and 1844 "The Artist of the Beautiful", William Douglas O'Connor's 1891 "The Brazen Android" (where Bacon devises it to terrify King Henry into accepting Simon de Montfort's demands for greater democracy), John Cowper Powys's 1956 The Brazen Head, and Robertson Davies's 1970 Fifth Business. Bacon appears in Rudyard Kipling's 1926 story 'The Eye of Allah'.

== See also ==
- Baco, a lunar crater named for Roger Bacon
- History of geomagnetism, of translation, of the scientific method, and of science in the Middle Ages
- John of St Amand
- List of Catholic clergy scientists
- Oxford Franciscan school
- Roger Bacon High School
- Vitello
- Wilfrid Voynich
