= Thomas of York =

Thomas of York may refer to:

- Thomas of Bayeux (d. 1100), a.k.a. Thomas I of York, Archbishop of York
- Thomas II of York (d. 1114), Archbishop of York, nephew of Thomas I. Sometimes called "Thomas the Younger"
- Thomas of York (Franciscan), 13th-century theologian and philosopher
