= Oxford Franciscan school =

Group of scholastic philosophers

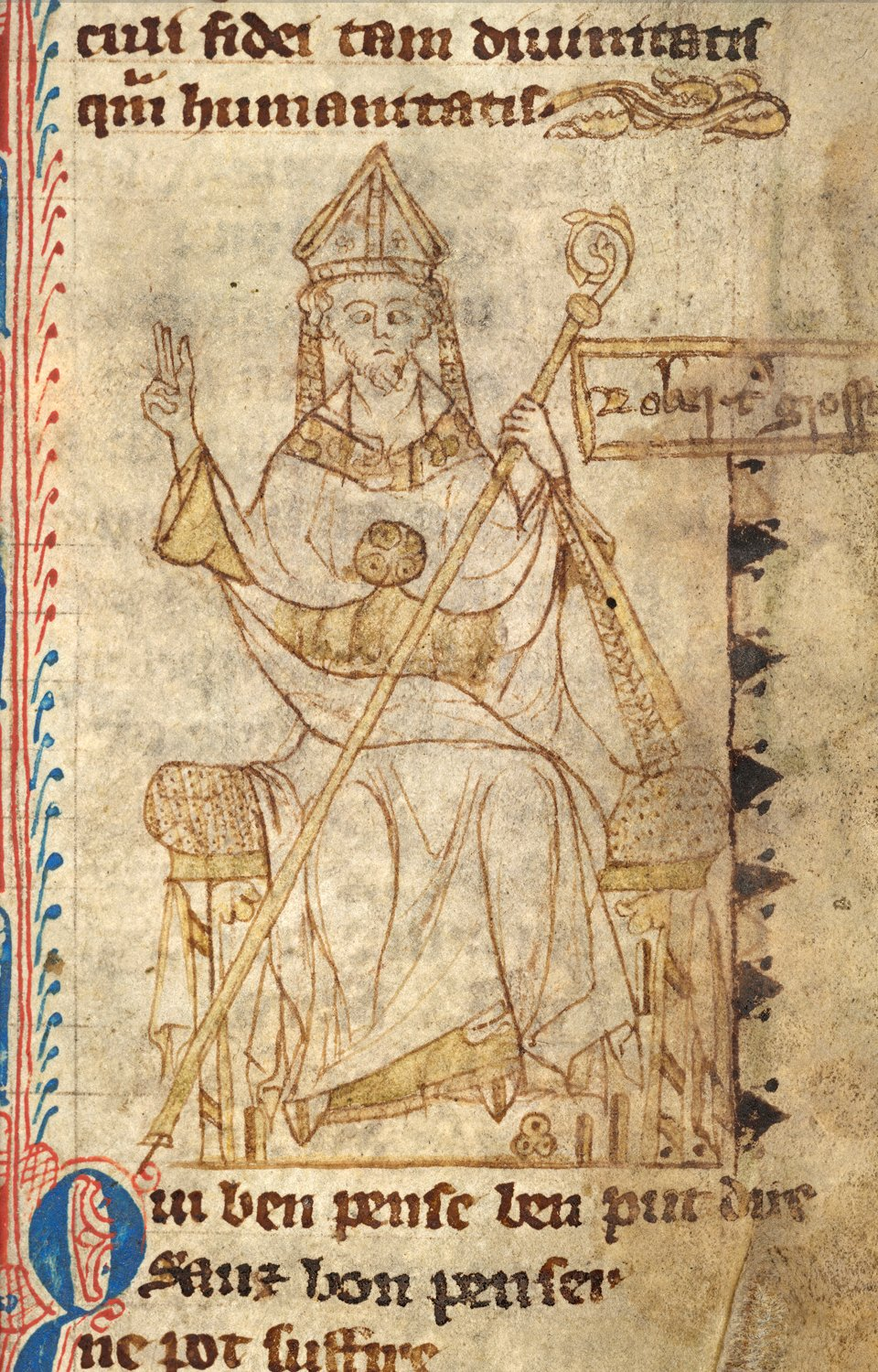
Portrait of Robert Grosseteste

The Oxford Franciscan school was the name given to a group of scholastic philosophers that, in the context of the Renaissance of the 12th century, gave special contribution to the development of science and scientific methodology during the High Middle Ages. This group includes such names as Robert Grosseteste, Roger Bacon, Duns Scotus and William of Ockham as well as Thomas of York, John Peckham, and Richard of Middleton.

Robert Grosseteste, was the founder of the Oxford Franciscan school. He was the first scholastic philosopher to fully understand Aristotle's vision of the dual path of scientific reasoning. Concluding from particular observations into a universal law, and then back again: from universal laws to prediction of particulars. Grosseteste called this "resolution and composition". Further, Grosseteste said that both paths should be verified through experimentation in order to verify the principles. These ideas established a tradition that carried forward to Padua and Galileo Galilei in the 17th century.

Under the tuition of Grosseteste and inspired by the writings of Arab alchemists who had preserved and built upon Aristotle's portrait of induction, Bacon described a repeating cycle of observation, hypothesis, experimentation, and the need for independent verification. He recorded the manner in which he conducted his experiments in precise detail so that others could reproduce and independently test his results — a cornerstone of the scientific method, and a continuation of the work of researchers like Albatenius.

== See also ==
- History of the scientific method
- History of science in the Middle Ages
