= Adam Marsh =

English Franciscan, scholar and theologian

- Born: c. 1200; Bath, England
- Died: 18 November 1259
- Occupations: Franciscan friar; scholar; theologian

Academic background
- Education: University of Oxford
- Academic advisor: Robert Grosseteste

Academic work
- Era: Medieval philosophy
- Discipline: Theology
- Region: Western philosophy
- School or tradition: Scholasticism
- Institutions: University of Oxford
- Notable students: Roger Bacon; Thomas of York

Adam Marsh (Adam de Marisco; c. 1200 – 18 November 1259) was an English Franciscan friar, scholar and theologian. Marsh became, after Robert Grosseteste, "...the most eminent master of England."

== Biography ==
He was born about 1200 in the diocese of Bath, and educated at Oxford (Greyfriars) under the famous Robert Grosseteste. Before 1226 Marsh received the benefice of Wearmouth from his uncle, Richard Marsh, Bishop of Durham; but around 1230 he entered the Franciscan order. at the friary in Worcester.

About 1238 he became lector at the Franciscan house at Oxford, and within a few years was regarded by the English province of that order as an intellectual and spiritual leader. Roger Bacon, his pupil, speaks highly of his attainments in theology and mathematics. According to Salimbene, in the 1240s, Marsh attended the lectures of Humilis of Milan on the Book of Isaiah and the Gospel of Mark. A lector named Stephen, in turn, used Marsh's Oxford lectione on Genesis, in his assignments. Marsh was a close acquaintance and correspondent of French theologian Thomas Gallus.

His fame, however, rests upon the influence which he exercised over the statesmen of his day. As Bishop of Lincoln, Grosseteste relied on his friend's opinion regarding ecclesiastical appointments in the diocese, since "Marsh knew everybody". Consulted as a spiritual director by Simon de Montfort, the countess of Leicester and the queen, as an expert lawyer and theologian by the primate, Boniface of Savoy, he did much to guide the policy both of the opposition and of the court party in all matters affecting the interests of the Church. He shrank from office, and never became provincial minister of the English Franciscans, though constantly charged with responsible commissions. Henry III and Archbishop Boniface unsuccessfully endeavoured to secure for him the see of Ely in 1256. In 1257 Marsh's health was failing, and he died 18 November 1259.

To judge from his correspondence he took no interest in secular politics. He sympathized with Montfort as with a friend of the Church and an unjustly treated man; but on the eve of the baronial revolution he was on friendly terms with the king. Faithful to the traditions of his order, he made it his ambition to be a mediator. He rebuked both parties in the state for their shortcomings, but he did not break with either.

== Works ==
None of Adam's theological works survive. His only extant writings are a collection of over 200 of his letters compiled by fellow Franciscans after his death. This collection shows the wide range of his correspondents, including Robert Grosseteste (whose own collection also includes several letters to Adam), William of Nottingham (minister provincial of England), Simon de Montfort and his wife Eleanor, Bonaventure, and Henry III's wife Queen Eleanor. His letters, written in highly stylized Latin according to the rules of the ars dictaminis, often served to advance his theological vision, particularly with regard to the pastoral work of the Church and his urgent sense of its need for correction and reform. His letters also frequently respond to requests for spiritual counsel, offering both exhortation and admonition.
