= John Stillman (judge) =

American lawyer, businessman and teacher

3rd Eau Claire County Judge
- In office 1866–1870
- Preceded by: Ira Mead
- Succeeded by: H. W. Barnes

Personal details
- Born: May 7, 1833 Carleton, New Brunswick, Canada
- Died: August 23, 1883 (aged 50) Orange City, Florida
- Resting place: Hollywood Cemetery, Orange City, Florida
- Party: Republican
- Spouse: Mary Lashier
- Occupation: Attorney, teacher

John E. Stillman (May 7, 1833 – August 23, 1883) was an American lawyer, businessman and teacher. Stillman was the first public school teacher in Eau Claire, and served as the third Eau Claire County judge. Later in his life, Stillman was one of the founders of Orange City, Florida, and served as its first postmaster.

== Biography ==
Born in New Brunswick, Canada in 1833, Stillman came to the United States in 1854, and traveled to Madison, Wisconsin to study law. He settled in Eau Claire in 1856. He was the first teacher in the first public school, beginning in the winter of 1856-57. He was admitted to State Bar of Wisconsin in September 1859, and practiced law under the firm name of Stillman and Edwards. Stillman was an investor and proprietor in the Metropolitan Hotel in Eau Claire until selling his share. In 1861, Stillman enlisted in a military company called the "Eau Claire Badgers" to fight in the United States Civil War. The company was never recognized by the Sixth Regiment. Stillman served as county judge from 1863 to 1865 and was a life member of the American Bible Society. In 1867, Stillman got into the lumber business with A. W. and L. P. Gorton, constructing and operating several log booms on the Chippewa River. In 1875, Seth French, John E. Stillman, and a group of others from Eau Claire decided to move south. They purchased about 5,000 acres of internal improvement land and started the town that became Orange City, Florida. They are credited as the founders of the city. The streets in the oldest section of the city are named after the founders. In 1882, he moved to Washington, D. C., where he resided for one year, then returning to Orange City.

== Family ==
In 1860, he married Mary Lashier. They raised three sons and two daughters.

== Death and burial ==
Stillman died in 1883 at the age of 50. He was buried at Hollywood Cemetery in Orange City, Florida.
