= Thomas of York (Franciscan) =

English theologian and scholastic philosopher (c. 1220 - before 1269)

Thomas of York (c. 1220 – before 1269) was an English Franciscan theologian and scholastic philosopher of the thirteenth century. He was associated with the Oxford Franciscan school.

He entered the Order of Friars Minor in 1242, and studied at the University of Oxford. He later was the leader of the Franciscan establishment at Cambridge. Along with Bonaventure and Thomas Aquinas, he was a major critic of the Parisian secular theologian William of Saint-Amour.

== Works ==
- Thomae Eboracensis, Sapientiale, Liber III, cap. 1-20, edited by Antonio Punzi, Florence, SISMEL-Edizioni del Galluzzo, 2020.
- Thomae Eboracensis, Sapientiale, Liber I, capp. 1.18, edited by Fiorella Retucci, Florence, SISMEL-Edizioni del Galluzzo, 2023.

== See also ==
- Adam Marsh
