= M. M. Pattison Muir =

British chemist and author (1848–1931)

Matthew Moncrieff Pattison Muir, FRSE, FCS (1848–1931) was a British chemist and author. He taught chemistry at Gonville and Caius College, Cambridge and was head of the Caius Laboratory there. Although he published some research on bismuth compounds, he became known through his textbooks and history of science works.

== Life ==
He was born on 1 April 1848 in Glasgow, the son of William Muir and his wealthy wife, Margaret Moncrieff Pattison.

Muir was educated at Glasgow High School then studied Sciences at the University of Glasgow and University of Tübingen. For a short period after his studies, he was a Demonstrator at Anderson's College, Glasgow in Sir Edward Thorpe's laboratory, and also at Owens College, Manchester under Sir Henry Roscoe.

In 1873 he married Florence Haslam. In the same year he was elected a Fellow of the Royal Society of Edinburgh. His proposers were William Thomson. Lord Kelvin, James Thomson Bottomley, Sir Thomas Edward Thorpe and James Young. He resigned from the Society in 1889.

In 1877 he was appointed Praelector at Gonville and Caius College, Cambridge, and in 1881 elected a Fellow of the college. He then became head of the Caius Laboratory here, a position he held until 1908, when he retired.

At Cambridge, between 1876 and 1888, Muir lead the research on bismuth compounds, resulting in 18 papers published by him alone or together with his students in the Journal of the Chemical Society. His coauthors were all young graduates, because there were no postgraduate students in chemistry at Cambridge then. He became better known as a writer than researcher though, through his numerous textbooks and history of chemistry treatises. The most successful textbook of Muir was his Principles of Chemistry, which he first published in 1884, and as a second edition in 1889.

In the long running water controversy (19th century to early 20th century), Muir's books Heroes of Science: Chemists (1883) and History of Chemical Theories and Laws (1907) have been noted among the few British books to properly credit Lavoisier (as opposed to Henry Cavendish) for proposing that water was a chemical compound rather than an element. In a 1993 book, historian of science Mary Jo Nye described Muir's chapter on affinity from his History of Chemical Theories and Laws as "still valuable treatment of the topic".

He died on 2 September 1931.

== Publications ==
=== Works on chemistry ===
- A History of Chemical Theories and Laws, 1907
- The Story of Wanderings of Atoms, especially those of Carbon, 1899 (publisher George Newnes Ltd)
- The Story of the Chemical Elements, 1897
- The Chemistry of Fire, 1893
- The Elements of Thermal Chemistry, 1885
- A Treatise on the Principles of Chemistry, 1884, 2nd edition in 1889
- Heroes of Science: Chemists, 1883

=== Works on alchemy ===
- The Story of Alchemy and the Beginnings of Chemistry, 1902
- The Alchemical Essence and the Chemical Element, 1894

=== Other ===
- Watts' Dictionary of Chemistry: Revised and Entirely Rewritten (with H. Forster Morley), 1906
