= John Maxson Stillman =

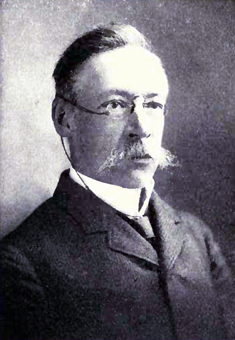
Stillman in 1922

John Maxson Stillman (1852-1923) was a pioneer of the history of science in the United States. He was also the first head of the chemistry department at Stanford University, as well as its first Chemistry Professor. His most enduring work was the posthumously published book The Story of Early Chemistry, decades later republished as The Story of Alchemy and Early Chemistry.

== Biography ==
Son of physician Jacob Davis Babcock Stillman and of Caroline Maxson, John Maxson studied chemistry first at University of California (1874), and then for two years abroad at University of Strasbourg and University of Würzburg. On his return, after teaching at the University of California (1876-1882), and working for the American Sugar Refining Company in Boston (1882-1891), he was appointed at the newly founded Stanford University as its first Chemistry Professor, and head of the department in its opening year. Although Stillman's appointment was essentially by fiat of Senator Stanford, who proposed a one-man list for David Starr Jordan to consider for this job, Stanford historian Eric Hutchinson writes that "There is always a risk that appointments made at the behest of the mighty may turn out badly, but Stillman's appointment was a good one." At Stanford, Stillman focused mostly on teaching and administration. He retired in 1917, and concentrated on writing thereafter. He died in December 1923. A 39-page in memoriam volume was published in the following year by five colleagues at Stanford. Stillman married Emma E. Rodolph. They had three daughters, Cara, Minna and Dorothy. Cara Stillman was a victim of the 1903 Iroquois Theatre fire in Chicago.

== Publications ==
Stillman's most significant work is The Story of Early Chemistry, a book published posthumously in 1924. A 1925 review in the Journal of Chemical Education by Edgar Fahs Smith found the book excellent but rather impersonal. The book was republished in 1960 by Courier Dover with the slightly modified title The Story of Alchemy and Early Chemistry. A review of this edition by historian Rhoda Rappaport (1962) in the Journal of the History of Medicine and Allied Sciences found it among the "best and most detailed treatments of a difficult subject", but criticized it for not being selective enough in deciding which of "those features of ancient and medieval thought and practice made a 'decided impress' upon the subsequent history" as the book's introduction promised. The book was described by Aaron John Ihde in The Development of Modern Chemistry (1964) as "an excellent account of the developments through Lavoisier", with the additional observations that "although subsequent scholarship has thrown new light on several matters, it is still one of the best American books on the subject." The editor of the Ambix journal remarked in 1994 that the Dover edition of Stillman's book was still in print and still worth reading.

Regarding Stillman's overall work, Hutchinson (1977) writes: "Disregarding his papers on subjects other than science, Stillman published a total of nineteen papers and one book—and, even so, managed to acquire a good reputation as a chemist. Of those publications, seven papers and his book on the history of alchemy were the product of his retirement years. Yet, slender as Stillman's output may seem by modern standards, what he did write was marked by scholarship of a high quality. In spite of the fact that he was not a strong classical scholar, and in spite of the meager resources of early California libraries as regards medieval manuscripts, Stillman's studies in the history of science are carefully researched and clearly written."
