= The Cambridge Companion to Aquinas =

1993 scholarly book edited by Norman Kretzmann and Eleonore Stump

- Editor: Norman Kretzmann; Eleonore Stump
- Language: English
- Subject: Thomas Aquinas
- Publisher: Cambridge University Press
- Publication date: 28 May 1993
- Publication place: United Kingdom
- Pages: 314
- ISBN: 978-05-21437-69-1
- OCLC: 26591547

The Cambridge Companion to Aquinas is a book edited by the American philosophers Norman Kretzmann and Eleonore Stump. A reference work, it features a number of writers who provides scholarly essays on the thoughts of the Italian Catholic philosopher and theologian Thomas Aquinas, collectively known as Thomism. The book was published on 28 May 1993 by Cambridge University Press. It received mixed responses from critics for being more focused to Aquinas' philosophy rather than his theology but has been deemed a valuable guide to the beginners by some.

== Summary ==
A reference work to the Italian Catholic philosopher and theologian Thomas Aquinas, the book contains ten chapters and begins with an editorial introduction by Norman Kretzmann and Eleonore Stump. The first chapter analyses Aquinas' philosophy in the context of his times. Chapter two is an essay about the relationship between his thoughts with those of Aristotle, collectively referred to as Thomism and Aristotelianism in respective. Chapter three examines Aquinas' influences from Islamic and Jewish thinkers. The next four chapters discuss his thoughts on metaphysics, philosophy of mind, epistemology, and ethics. The eighth chapter examines Aquinas' legal and political theory as viewed from historical and modern times. The ninth chapter focuses on the relation between his philosophy and theology. The final chapter is an analysis of Aquinas' biblical commentaries.

== Critical reception ==
Critically, The Cambridge Companion to Aquinas met with a mixed reception. In a review to The Journal of Religion, Joseph Wawrykow of the University of Notre Dame commended the editors for recruiting experts in the field of medieval philosophy, especially Thomism, to write the essays in the book. While praising the work in general, he was disappointed by it for not examining other "important theological issues", which include the Trinity, the Incarnation, and grace. With only two chapters devoted to Aquinas' theology, Wawrykow criticised the lack of attention given to this topic, which in other chapters only appears fragmentally. On the tenth chapter, he found that not only does "it fail to attend adequately to the biblical commentary as theological writings", which in his opinion is better than other forms of writing such as summae, it "appears too eager to impose on Thomas a modern, arguably reactionary agenda", including the use of historical criticism.

"Disagreement, of course, can be useful in the search for truth, but these differing notions of philosophy are simply set forth, without real engagement in the volume itself. Newcomers to Aquinas, lacking the resources to decide among these opinions, will in all likelihood find these different positions more bewildering than helpful."

— Wawrykow concluded his review

Williell R. Thomson of Speculum began his review by comparing it to other books of the Cambridge Companion series and added "the present volume anatomises its subject into ten more or less self-contained subsystems and devotes a chapter by an acknowledged authority to each". Thomson, however, questioned the reasons behind the authors who are all from North American institutions (except Jan A. Aertsen of the Vrije Universiteit Amsterdam, who wrote the first chapter) and wondered if there have been a few European Thomists; he suggested that the answer should have been written in the introduction. Thomson criticised the book's elucidatory prose that are not "user-friendly", thus he felt that the book is suited more to specialists than beginners.

Writing for The Philosophical Quarterly, the American Catholic priest John I. Jenkins said that it presents successfully—as written in its introduction—that it will be giving deeper knowledge to the novices of Thomism. Jenkins broke down his compliment into two points: 1) The clarity, well-writtenness and wide scope of topic of the essays and 2) "that the collection exemplifie[d] may have been achieved unwittingly". The apparent difference of the views of each scholar, according to Jenkins, "can serve to indicate to the perspective reader just where some of the interesting and controversial questions in Thomistic scholarship lie". He concluded his review by writing that the book, not only a valuable guide to the school of thought, can help "the perceptive and diligent reader to some of the unresolved issues in a vibrant and engaging field of scholarship".

In a review to The Philosophical Review, Brian Davies said that the book has comprehensive yet concise essays that are written from critical perspectives and helpful to the beginners in comprehending Thomistic thoughts, praising those by John F. Wippel, Kretzmann, and Ralph McInerny in particular. He noted all the essays are centralised on what Aquinas said on the existence of God, but suggested to also add about his thoughts on Christian doctrines in the book's second edition. Davies, however, found it superior than Anthony Kenny's Aquinas: A Collection of Critical Essays (1969), which he found lacking an overview of Aquinas. In contrast, Felipe de Azevedo Ramos of the Lumen Veritatis called the 2011 Oxford Handbook of Aquinas better than The Cambridge Companion to Aquinas. François Beets of Revue internationale de philosophie described the work as "an annoying book". Beets wrote that the entirety of the book fails to examine how Aquinas' philosophy may be viewed in the 20th century.

"The volume aims at providing an introduction or guide to all aspects of Thomas's philosophy that is suitable for nonspecialists as well as advanced students. It is difficult to imagine that the book would be suitable for readers who have not had some preparation, but it may prove helpful to advanced undergraduate or, more likely, beginning graduate students."

— Douglas Kries of The Review of Metaphysics

E. P. Bos wrote a three-page positive review of the book to Vivarium; in the end of his review, he called it "a very interesting, clearly written introduction to Thomas for anybody who wishes to know more than e.g. histories of philosophy or philosophical dictionaries usually offer". Timothy McDermott of the New Blackfriars bemoaned that the companion focuses more on Aquinas only as a philosopher than theologian, and saw the final chapter, written by Stump, as not substantially contributing to the book. McDermott also observed of many spelling mistakes; "lead" for "led" in page 89, "goood" in page 198, "intenal" in page 207, "constitutent" and "not look" for "not to look" in page 211, and "surbordinated" in page 242.

A reviewer in the Zeitschrift für philosophische Forschung commended The Cambridge Companion to Aquinas's essays, saying they are informative and clearly written while also free from apologetic tones. E. J. Ashworth of the Analytic Philosophy said the first and third chapters are "offer a useful corrective to any tendency to see Aquinas too exclusively in relation to Aristotle". Ashworth added that the last two essays "consider more strictly theological aspects of Aquinas's thought", and their presence in the book "raise the question of whether Aquinas can properly be considered a philosopher at all, and the majority of the papers take up this issue in one way or another, as does the editors' introduction". Ashworth also argued that most of Aquinas' writings are theological and wondered why most attention were given instead to his philosophy.

== Publication history ==
Region	Release date	Format	Publisher	Ref.
India	28 May 1993	Paperback	Cambridge University Press	
India	24 December 1993	Hardcover	Cambridge University Press	
