= The Oxford Handbook of Aquinas =

2012 reference work

- Editor: Brian Davies; Eleonore Stump
- Language: English
- Series: Oxford Handbook
- Subject: Thomas Aquinas
- Publisher: Oxford University Press
- Publication date: 25 January 2012
- Publication place: United Kingdom
- Pages: 610
- ISBN: 978-01-95326-09-3
- OCLC: 656158705

The Oxford Handbook of Aquinas is a book edited by the Catholic philosophers Brian Davies and Eleonore Stump. A reference work, it features a number of writers who provides scholarly essays on the life and views of the Italian Catholic philosopher and theologian Thomas Aquinas. The book, published on 25 January 2012 by Oxford University Press, was a part of the Oxford Handbook series, and was positively reviewed by critics, some deemed it a valuable introduction to Aquinas' thoughts, collectively known as Thomism.

== Summary ==
A reference work on the views of the Italian Catholic philosopher and theologian Thomas Aquinas, the book is divided into eight thematic areas, and starts with an editorial introduction by Brian Davies and Eleonore Stump. The first part covers his life, works and influences in five essays. The second part, containing four essays, examines Aquinas' philosophy about metaphysics and the existence of God, including his Five Ways. The third part consists of five essays on his thoughts, including those about the simplicity, omnibenevolence, impassibility, immutability, eternity and omnipotence of God. The next part covers his philosophy of ethics and action theory in eight essays. The fifth part has four essays on his thoughts regarding epistemology and philosophy of mind, and the sixth part has two essays on theory of language. The seventh part presents eight essays about Aquinas' theology, including the Trinity, the Incarnation and sacraments. The final part has two essays examining his legacy.

== Critical reception ==
In a brief, four-star review for the journal Choice: Current Reviews for Academic Libraries, W. P. Haggerty of the Gannon University took note of the quality of the work's essays on God's omniscience, the problem of evil and soteriology, and said the whole book is impressive. A Contemporary Review writer concluded, "For those coming to Aquinas for the first time, especially for those who are not theologians, this is a most welcome introduction to a man whose writing challenges as much today as it did 700 years ago."

Fergus Kerr of the New Blackfriars began his review by writing, "Beautiful books physically, the Oxford Handbook series offers state-of-the-art surveys of thinking and research in the chosen field." He went on to call the book "a thoroughly reliable introduction for newcomers", and commented positively of its well-researched essays, each, Kerr says, contains "some equally stimulating contention". Writing for the Spanish journal Anuario Filosófico, Pedro José Grande Sánchez of the University of Navarra wrote that, like other Oxford handbooks that "always aim to present knowledge that is of value and interest to the scientific community", The Oxford Handbook of Aquinas does the same. Sánchez praised Oxford for dedicating such work to Aquinas, believing that it will be a significant contribution to the so-called Thomism.

Felipe de Azevedo Ramos of the Lumen Veritatis described the book as "an outstanding summary—probably the best ever written—of Aquinas' thought, which far surprasses The Cambridge Companion to Aquinas, published in 1993". While praising the whole work as being significant to the Thomistic school of thought, de Azevedo Ramos wrote that it would have been more comprehensive if it has a chapter on aesthetics and more use of Latin terminology in order to avoid ambiguities and unclarities. In a review to The Heythrop Journal, Mark K. Spencer of the University of St. Thomas took note of the range of topics examined in the book, complimenting its attention to the historical details of Aquinas' times and interpretations of his thoughts "that are somewhat at odds with a straight-forward analytic or purely Aristotelian reading".

== Publication history ==
Region	Release date	Format	Publisher	Ref.
India	25 January 2012	Amazon Kindle	Oxford University Press	
India	25 January 2012	Hardcover	Oxford University Press	
India	1 February 2014	Paperback	Oxford University Press	

== Bibliography ==
- Davies, Brian; Stump, Eleonore, eds. (25 January 2012). The Oxford Handbook of Aquinas. Oxford University Press. ISBN 978-0-1953-2609-3.
