= Marsilius of Inghen =

Dutch philosopher

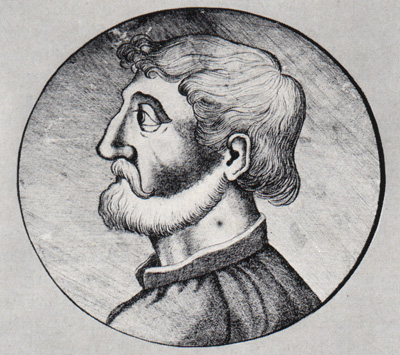
- Marsilius of Inghen, copy from the 18th century of a Renaissance woodcut
- Born: c. 1340 near Nijmegen, Duchy of Guelders
- Died: 20 August 1396; Heidelberg, Electorate of the Palatinate

Education
- Education: University of Paris; University of Heidelberg

Philosophical work
- Era: Medieval philosophy
- Region: Western philosophy
- School: Nominalism
- Main interests: Logic, natural philosophy, theology
- Notable ideas: Ampliation as an extension of supposition

Marsilius of Inghen (c. 1340 – 20 August 1396) was a Dutch philosopher of the later Middle Ages who studied with Albert of Saxony and Nicole Oresme under Jean Buridan. He was Magister at the University of Paris as well as at the University of Heidelberg from 1386 to 1396.

== Life ==
He was born near Nijmegen. Details about his family and early life are not well known, the first known date of his biography being 27 September 1362. On that day, he gave his Magister Artium lecture at the University of Paris. There, he received his master of arts, then took up work and was rector in 1367 and 1371. Aside from his philosophical and logical studies, he also studied theology, in which subject his lectures enjoyed large popularity. In 1378, Marsilius was the delegate of the University of Paris for the Pope Urban VI in Tivoli.

After 1379, the name of Marsilius of Inghen was not mentioned anymore in the recordings of the University of Paris. He was probably driven out of the university because of a schism. In 1386, Marsiluis became the first rector of the University of Heidelberg, which he founded with the help of Rupert I, Elector Palatine. He was, furthermore, the first theologian to receive a doctorate from the university.

In 1386, Marsilius became Magister at the University of Heidelberg, of which he was rector nine times altogether: From 1386, the year of the foundation of the university, to 1392 and still from June 23 up to his death. From 1389 to 1390, he was responsible for transferring the university register to Rome. Afterwards, he took up again the study of theology. Deceased just months later, Marsilius of Inghen was buried in the Church of Peter (Heidelberger Peterskirche) at Heidelberg.

== Philosophy ==
=== Overview ===
In logic, he was an Aristotelian nominalist; in natural philosophy, an empiricist. He applied a synthesis of the new 14th century physics of Buridan, Thomas Bradwardine and Oresme in his commentaries on Aristotle. Both his theological and philosophical works are characterized by a logico-semantical approach in which he followed Buridan, combined with an eclectic use of older theories, sometimes more Aristotelian and sometimes more Neoplatonist; this fact that renders narrow the label "Ockhamist" often applied to Marsilius.

=== Nominalism ===
Marsilius of Inghen is most well-known for his work in nominalism. Though no one called themselves nominalists in the 14th century, he is considered one of the movement's "forefathers." In his nominalist philosophy, he accepted the basic nominalist foundation, namely that universals are only existent within the mind, and outside the mind there are only individuals. He advocated that human knowledge can be derived from a foundation of sensory knowledge. However, to Marsilius, metaphysical knowledge was the greatest obtainable form of knowledge. This is due to its ability to grasp the most highly universal propositions.

=== The object of scientific knowledge ===
From his beliefs in nominalism in conjunction with his Aristotelian influences follows his reasoning on the object of scientific knowledge. Marsilius claims such an object must be singular and conform to Aristotle's requirement that such an object must be a necessary universal. Therefore, given Marsilius’ acceptance of the basic nominalist foundation—that is, universals are only in the mind—objects of science are predicates which exist in the mind and describe the individuals in the world outside of the mind.

=== Natural philosophy ===
As already mentioned, he accepted that knowledge is made evident via sensory knowledge, i.e., he was an empiricist. However, he also accepted a priori truths to be an acceptable source of scientific knowledge. Also noteworthy is Marsilius’ theory behind impetus. Following in the footsteps of Buridan, Marsilius rejected the Aristotelian theory and claimed that such forces are the transfer of some property from that which did the affecting into the affected object.

In his Questions on the Eight Books of the Physics, Marsilius cites ancient experiments with the clepsydra as proof that "nature abhors a vacuum."

== Theology ==
Marsilius began studies of theology at the University of Paris in 1366, though the majority of his theological study took place during his time at the University of Heidelberg. His overall theological philosophy was influenced by Adam Wodeham, Gregory of Rimini, Thomas Aquinas, and Bonaventure. However, he does not wholly follow their thinking and holds original ideas on the subject.

In considering the creation of the world by God, Marsilius held that God did not create the world as eternal, and that such a means of creation was not contrary to God's perfection. Concerning Marsilius’ other specific theological thought, he believed his natural philosophy led to both some true knowledge of God, as well as an impediment towards complete true knowledge of God. Humans' natural capacities, according to Marsilius, are sufficient to derive the truth of propositions asserting God's existence, God having a will, and God having knowledge. Natural capacities, although achieving that much, are unable to reach the truth of propositions asserting God's omnipotence, God's free will, and God's ability to create ex nihilo. Hence, Marsilius thought that using nothing but one's natural capacities in trying to find true knowledge of God will actually lead to the negation of God's omnipotence, free will, and ability to create ex nihilo. Not only this, but the use of logic in general regarding theological study was something Marsilius didn't wholly accept. In order for one to reach such knowledge of God, one must use Christian faith. This faith is the only means to reach the knowledge of God, which natural capacities cannot obtain. In this sense, Marsilius advocated that natural human knowledge is such that it is limited in its capability to comprehend the divine, but still aids the search for such knowledge.

Also crucial to his theological studies are his thoughts regarding a version of divine simplicity—of which he was highly influenced by Wodeham. Even though human knowledge seems to abstract various properties or parts of God, such extrapolations are merely existent in human conceptions of God. God truly has only one essence and is one singular unity, according to Marsilius.

== Influence ==
Following Marsilius’ death, his works became rather well known. Marsilius was revered as one of the greatest nominalists of his time, alongside Ockham and Buridan. His extensive questions and commentaries on Aristotle (including commentaries on De Generatione et Corruptione, De Anima, Metaphysics, Physics, and Ethics) became textbooks for students throughout various universities. Moreover, his theology became widely read and influential in Spanish theology. He was influential on Central European philosophy of later centuries, both through his own philosophy and by the way he stimulated reform of university programmes. In the 16th century, there were still references to a "Marsilian way" in logic and physics.

== Bibliography ==
- Quaestiones super quattuor libros Sententiarum, vol. 1: Super primum, quaestiones 1-7, ed. G. Wieland, M. Santos Noya, M. J. F. M. Hoenen, M. Schulze, Studies in the History of Christian Thought 87, ed. M. Santos Noya, Leiden 2000.
- Quaestiones super quattuor libros Sententiarum, vol. 2: Super primum, quaestiones 8-21, ed. G. Wieland, M. Santos Noya, M. J. F. M. Hoenen, M. Schulze, Studies in the History of Christian Thought 88, ed. M. Santos Noya, Leiden 2000.
- Treatises on the Properties of Terms. A First Critical Edition of the Suppositiones, Ampliationes, Appellationes, Restrictiones and Alienationes with Introduction, Translation, Notes, and Appendices, ed. E. P. Bos, Synthese Historical Library 22, Dordrecht 1983.
