= Clepsydra =

Clepsydra may refer to:

- Clepsydra, an alternative name for a water clock.
- In ancient Greece, a device (now called a water thief) for drawing liquids from vats too large to pour, which utilized the principles of air pressure to transport the liquid from one container to another.
- Clepsydra Geyser in the Lower Geyser Basin of Yellowstone
- Clepsydra (diatom), a genus of protists
- Klepsydra well on the Akropolis.
