= Hermannus Alemannus =

Latin translator

Hermannus Alemannus (Latin for Herman the German) translated Arabic philosophical works into Latin. He worked at the Toledo School of Translators around the middle of the thirteenth century (from approximately 1240 to 1256) and is almost certainly to be identified with the Hermannus who was bishop of Astorga in León from 1266 until his death in 1272.

== Work ==
His translations have been identified from prologues and colophons in the surviving manuscripts, three of which are dated. They are: the Rhetoric, comprising the almost complete text of Aristotle interspersed with portions of Averroes' middle commentary and short fragments from Avicenna and Alfarabi; the introductory section of Alfarabi's commentary on the Rhetoric; Averroes' middle commentary on the Nicomachean Ethics (Toledo, 1240); an Arabic epitome of the Ethics known as the Summa Alexandrinorum (1243 or 1244); and the middle commentary on the Poetics (Toledo, 1256), this last being known as the Poetria.

== See also ==
- The Cambridge History of Later Medieval Philosophy : From the Rediscovery of Aristotle to the Disintegration of Scholasticism, 1100-1600, editors: Norman Kretzmann, Anthony Kenny, Jan Pinborg; associate editor: Eleonore Stump. Cambridge [Cambridgeshire]; New York : Cambridge University Press, c1982. pp. 59–60.
- Pérez González, Maurilio. Herman el Alemán, traductor de la Escuela de Toledo: Estado de la cuestión. Minerva: Revista de filología clásica, ISSN 0213-9634. Volum 6 (1992), pàgines 269-284. (in Spanish)
- Fidora, A. and Akasoy, A.A. Hermannus alemannus und die alia traslatio der Nikomachischen Ethik. Bulletin de philosophie médiévale, ISSN 0068-4023. Volum 44 (2002), pàgines 79-94. (in German)
