= Bede Jarrett =

English Catholic priest and scholar (1881–1934)

The Very Rev. Bede Jarrett O.P.
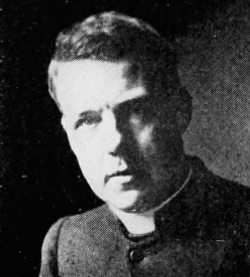
- Born: Cyril Jarrett; 22 August 1881; Greenwich, England
- Died: 17 March 1934 (aged 52); London, England
- Education: University of Oxford; Catholic University of Leuven
- Occupations: Clergyman, writer

Bede Jarrett OP (22 August 1881 – 17 March 1934) was an English Dominican friar and Catholic priest who was also a noted historian and author. Known for works including Mediæval Socialism and The Emperor Charles IV, Jarrett also founded Blackfriars Priory at the University of Oxford in 1921, formally reinstating the Dominican Order at that university for the first time since the Dissolution of the Monasteries under King Henry VIII.

== Early life and education ==
Born in Greenwich as Cyril Jarrett, he was the fifth of six sons to parents Colonel H.S. Jarrett, Companion of the Order of the Indian Empire (CIE), and Agnes (Beaufort) Jarrett. Beginning in 1891, Jarrett studied at Stonyhurst, and in August 1898 he joined the Order of Preachers (OP), also known as the Dominican Order, at St Dominic's Priory in London. Jarrett continued to study at the novitiate in Woodchester and became a novice on 24 September 1898 under the new name of Friar Bede. His religious name was for Bede, known as "the Venerable Bede", an early British Catholic saint sometimes called the Father of English History. On 30 August 1900, Jarrett moved to continue his studies of philosophy, theology and history at Hawkesyard Priory and received minor orders and the subdiaconate, and diaconate in 1902.

In 1904 Jarrett became the first Dominican friar since the Reformation to study at the University of Oxford, matriculating as a student with the Benedictines at St Benet's Hall. He studied history and completed his degree in 1907. On 18 December 1904, after his first term at Oxford, Jarrett was ordained in Woodchester. To complete his formal education, in 1908 he received his lectorate in theology at Louvain.

== Career ==
St Dominic's Priory became Jarrett's first and long-time station. Appointed prior at the "unusually early" age of 33 and beginning his position on 17 June 1914, Jarrett became the elected provincial two years after on 5 September 1916 and held the office until his death in 1934 after a record four successful elections. His accomplishments at St Dominic's included expanding the Laxton Dominican School for Boys, beginning a series of Thomistic lectures sponsored by London University and launching missions in the Middle East and South Africa. He felt it was important that Dominicans preach abroad rather than concentrate efforts domestically, a departure from the previous provincial who had not pursued the South African mission for that reason.

=== Blackfriars Priory ===
Jarrett also founded the Blackfriars Dominican priory in Oxford. Construction began on 15 August 1921; it took Jarrett eight years to raise the funds to build the new priory, the success of which peers attributed to his frequent trips to and fundraising in the United States. The event earned a letter of congratulations and encouragement from Pope Benedict XV. The priory opened in 1929 but was incomplete at the time of Jarrett's death.

=== Writings and publications ===
Jarrett authored numerous books, prayers and articles, including five entries in the Catholic Encyclopedia. He also purchased Blackfriars, a Dominican magazine renamed New Blackfriars in the 1960s, for £40 in 1919 and persuaded publisher Basil Blackwell to publish it, which prevented it from being discontinued.

== Death ==
Jarrett died of sudden illness at the Hospital of St John and St Elizabeth in London on 17 March 1934. He was buried at the Dominican priory in Woodchester.

== Influence ==
- Jarrett knew author Graham Greene, also an Oxford graduate, and instructed his wife Vivien prior to her reception into the Catholic Church in 1922. He became godfather to Lucy Caroline Greene, their daughter, in 1933. Greene biographers W.J. West and Michael G. Brennan speculate that Greene's relationship with Jarrett and Jarrett's works, including Mediaeval Socialism and Social Theories in the Middle Ages, influenced Greene's writings.
- The Encyclopedia of World Biography lists Jarrett's The Emperor Charles IV as the standard biography of Holy Roman Emperor Charles IV.

== Bibliography ==
=== Books ===
Title	Publication date	Notes
Mediaeval Socialism	1914	
S. Antonino and Mediæval Economics	1914	
Meditations for Layfolk	1915	Later published under the title Classic Catholic Meditations
Saint Catherine of Siena: Her Life and Times	1916	With Catherine Mary Antony
The Abiding Presence of the Holy Ghost in the Soul	1918	Later published under the titles He Dwells in Your Soul and The Little Book of the Holy Spirit
Living Temples	1919	
The Religious Life	1920	
The English Dominicans	1921	
Life of St. Dominic	1924	
Social Theories in the Middle Ages: 1200–1500	1926	
A history of Europe from earliest times to the present	1929	
The Space of Life Between	1930	
House of Gold: Lenten Sermons	1931	
No Abiding City: Lenten Conferences Given at Our Lady of Victories	1932	
Our Lady of Lourdes: Meditations on the Saleve Regina	1934	
Contardo Ferrini	1934	
The Emperor Charles IV	1935	Published after Jarrett's death
Purity	1937	

=== Letters ===
Title	Publication date	Editor(s)	Notes
Letters of Bede Jarrett	1989	Simon Tugwell, Aidan Bellenger	
