= Optimal stimulation level =

Human behaviour model

The optimal stimulation level (OSL) is the amount of stimulation individuals seek in life. In theories which consider human actions will be affected by motivational tendencies, the concept that for achieving a favorable stimulation level, social practices stimulated by pure desire plays a significant role. The medium levels of stimulation, which is also called the optimum stimulation level, are the most common one to be chosen, and due to individual difference, the determination of the optimal stimulation level (OSL) vary between each person.

People may explore surroundings for reaching satisfy stimulation, meaning that individuals who have a high optimum stimulation level are more likely to be attracted to exploration. Therefore, the relationship between human needs for motivation and their tendency of exploration indicates that the optimum stimulation level probably has a decisive influence in behaviors.

With the most well-pleasing intermediate stimulation level, an inverted U-shaped function exists between stimulation acquired from the environment, and human stimulated response. People who have high optimum stimulation level attract by stimulation and others avoid stimulation.

== Customer behavior ==
The OSL, which has an unusually productive influence on variety searching, cognitive reactions of consumers, information seeking, innovative behaviors, and risk decision making, play a significant role in exploratory buyers' behaviors.

There are three classifications about the inquiry of tendencies for consumer reaction, including behaviors engaged by curiosity, variety searching, and assumption of risk and innovative practices.

Curiosity can categorize as particular interest stimulated behavior and diverse curiosity encouraged the practice. The first mentioned of two displays an in-depth analysis for a single incentive because this stimulation evokes curiousness of consumer; in this situation, exploration is a reaction for a specific stimulus motivated by collative properties. However, the diverse curiosity, which can be initiated by an assortment of sources, refers to the response for boredom, meaning that it does not react to a particular stimulus.

For changing pace, people will shift purchasing behavior for familiar objects such as stores to access stimulation — this action named as variety seeking. Acquiring from purchasing behavior, the suboptimal level of stimulation leads customers to feel tedious after they simplify their decision procedure. As a result, they tend to enhance the complexity of the buying process.

A positive relationship exists between OSL and risk undertaking behavior. According to the idea of an opportunity of loss, a majority of conceptions of risk-taking built. This point of view is similar to the leading theory among consumer behavior; the perceived risk establishes as a two dimensions function: consequences uncertainty and consequences significant or magnitude.

=== Innovation and stimulation ===
A supposition used during the discussion about buyers’ behaviors means that consumers actions display a mechanical operation which operates to prevent imbalances due to an unexpected stimulus input caused. However, because the apparent propensity to search for new expending experiences, the hypothesis which refers to buyers seek to reduce stimulation to the minimum is hard to identify. The conception of OSL provides an adequate point of view. The innate character of this concept is that people struggle to stay the OSL; otherwise, the deviation from optimality results in a re-establishment of stimulus input within the optimum intermediate interval. An optimum stimulation level provided with internal stability but the difference between each person.

Based on the tendency of buyers for perception seeking, the property of the adoption decision-making process has a difference between both recently developed retail facilities and innovative products. Hypothesis confirms that high sensory seekers are more sensitive to realize the new alternatives, think over more options, making less rejection decision with cognitive assessment, will attempt and eventually take more innovations. Generally, high-sensitivity seekers incline to have a reasonable expectation for goods and equipment through the evaluation stage entering the practical experiments, but consciousness and the model that is ultimately adopted seem to depend on the essence of innovation.

== Recreational shopping tendency ==
For leisure consumers, whether to buy products or enjoy services, shopping is a comfortable way to spend time. They want to buy in beautiful surroundings, which is engaging, full of surprises, surreal, exciting, and safe to evoke an enjoyable shopping experience. Other words, casual consumers trend to shop in an environment which is considered containing emotional stimulation, and the emotion caused by stimulation probably is pleasing. Several functions have a relation with OSL:

- The inverted U-shaped function: the OSL does not create influence
- The butterfly curve function: the OSL produces effects, which are similar to the zero influence, with moderate deviations.
- The inverted U-shaped function: the OSL create maximum effects

The researcher considers that the favorable wake level of stimulation containing two majority elements: the first is a crucial component named novelty, and the second is called conflict, which is a negative feature. The novelty component refers to the joint effects of the number of increases in individuals' ideal attributes such as the level of surprise; the other component indicates the negative aspects of persons, including vagueness and uncertainty. The sum of these two different independent variables represents the entire preference for stimulation.

== Color in advertising ==
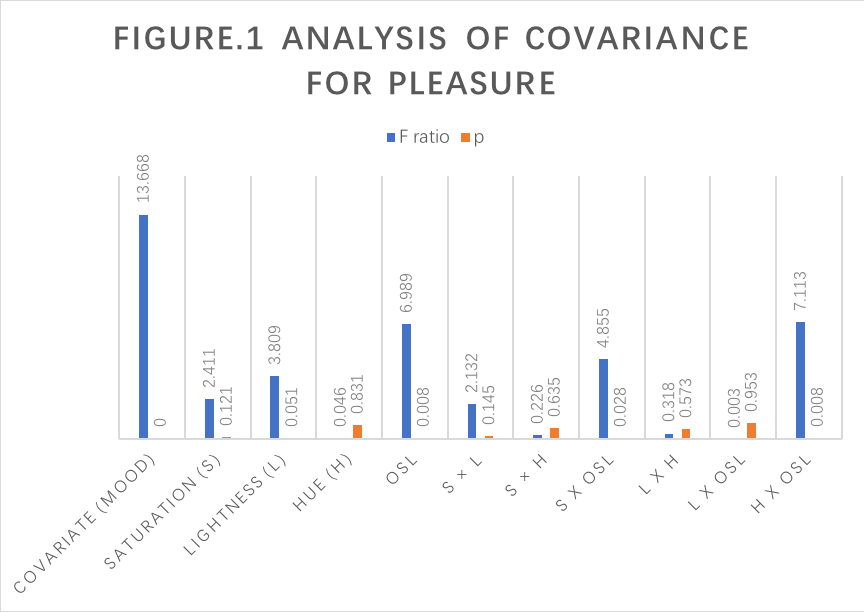

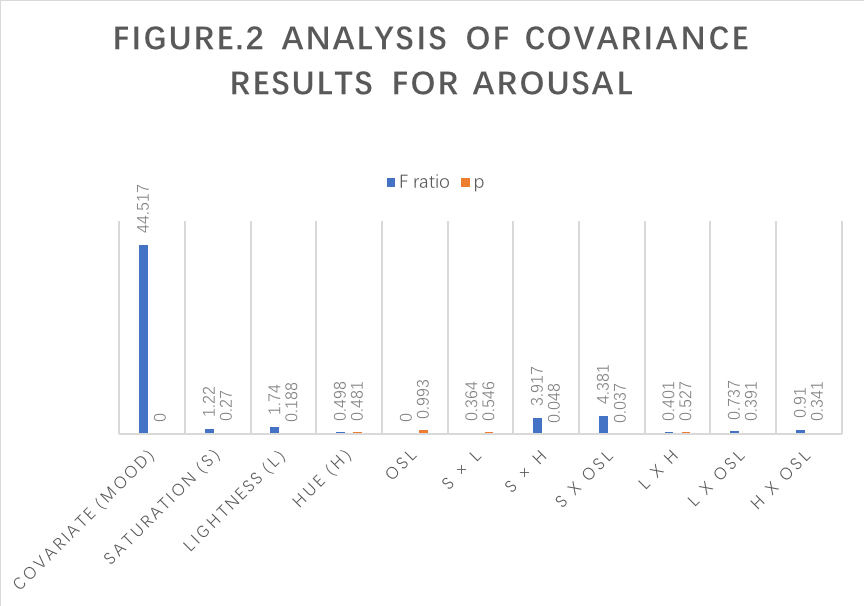

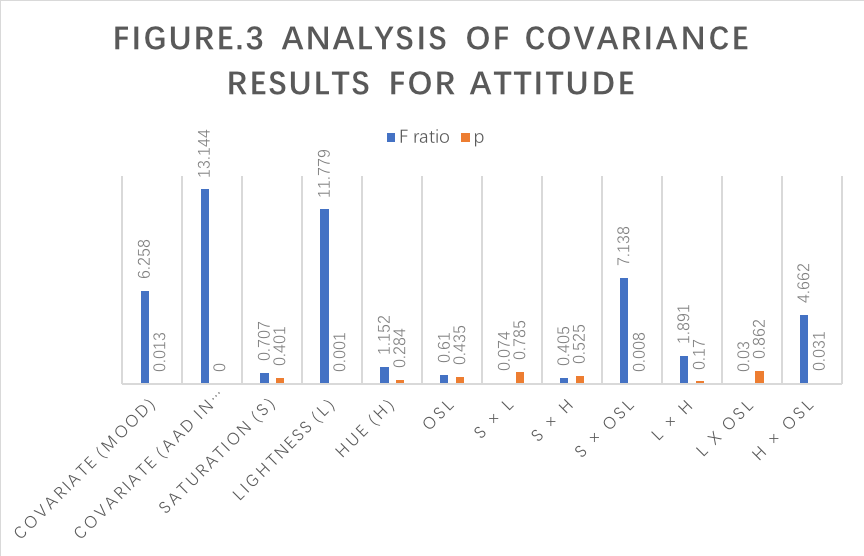

Color is crucial in advertising because it influences human attitudes for advertising. Assuming effects of color are different for people, the optimal stimulation level plays a significant role in the relationship between a predictor or independent variable and a standard or dependent variable. This concept indicates that the OSL for people will affect their preference of colors.

== Online consumers behaviors ==
The Internet provides hypermedia surroundings for consumers to interact easily with companies. It is a compelling social medium due to its unique features, including comprehensive coverage, liable receiving consumers feedback, low cost, the ability to squeeze space and time, etc. Because websites contain diversity information and varying different levels of hedonic features, the individual variable, the OSL, need to be considered for the study of internet shopping.
