= Mark Wynn =

British theologian

Mark R. Wynn
- Awards: Fellow of the British Academy (2022)

Academic background
- Education: University of Oxford
- Thesis: God and the World: The Place of Explanation in Natural Theology (1991)
- Doctoral advisor: Brian Davies; Richard Swinburne

Academic work
- Discipline: Philosophy, theology
- Institutions: King's College London; University of Glasgow; Australian Catholic University; University of Exeter; University of Leeds (2013–2020); Oriel College, Oxford (2020–present)

Mark Wynn FBA is a British philosopher of religion, philosophical theologian and academic. He is the seventh Nolloth Professor of the Philosophy of the Christian Religion at Oriel College, University of Oxford. He was formerly the president of the British Society for the Philosophy of Religion.

== Education and career ==
Wynn earned a BA in Philosophy and Theology at the University of Oxford, Hertford College. He earned a DPhil in 1991 at Oxford (Linacre College) under the supervision of Brian Davies and Richard Swinburne for his dissertation, God and the World: The Place of Explanation in Natural Theology.

Following a position at King's College London, he became a research fellow at University of Glasgow. He then held positions at the Australian Catholic University and the University of Exeter. From 2013 to 2020, Wynn was a professor of philosophy and religion at the University of Leeds. He joined the Faculty of Theology and Religion and the Faculty of Philosophy at Oxford in July 2020.

In 2022, he was elected a Fellow of the British Academy (FBA), the United Kingdom's national academy for the humanities and social sciences.

== Books ==
- God and Goodness: A Natural Theological Perspective (Routledge, 2002) ISBN 9780415199155
- Emotional Experience and Religious Understanding: Integrating Perception, Conception and Feeling (Cambridge University Press, 2005) ISBN 9780521840569
- Faith and Place: An Essay in Embodied Religious Epistemology (Oxford University Press, 2009) ISBN 9780199560387
- Renewing the Senses: A Study of the Philosophy and Theology of the Spiritual Life (Oxford University Press, 2013) ISBN 9780199669981
- Spiritual Traditions and the Virtues: Living Between Heaven and Earth (Oxford University Press, 2020) ISBN 9780198862949
