= Richard Finn =

British historian and Roman Catholic theologian (born 1963)

The Reverend Richard Damian Finn O.P.
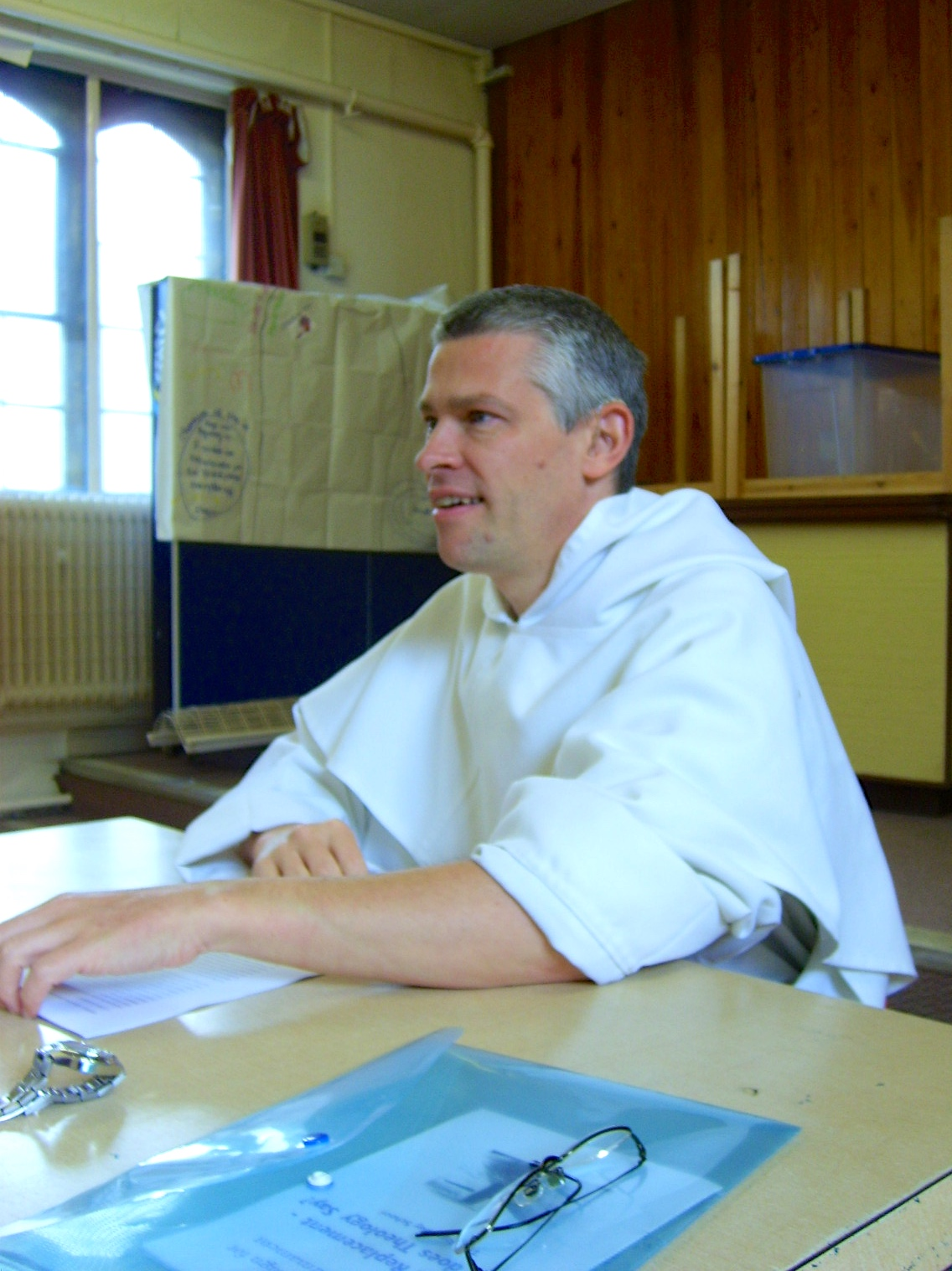
- Born: 27 March 1963 (age 63); Mylor Bridge, Cornwall, England
- Education: St Catharine's College, Cambridge; Jesus College, Cambridge; Corpus Christi College, Oxford
- Occupations: Priest, Academic, Theologian, Historian

Richard Damian Finn, O.P. (born 27 March 1963) is a British historian and Roman Catholic theologian, currently serving as Director of the Las Casas Institute for Social Justice at Blackfriars, Oxford, and a member of the Theology Faculty and the Classics Faculty at the University of Oxford. He has previously served as Regent of Blackfriars, as well as Novice Master for the English Province of the Order of Preachers.

== Education ==
Richard Finn was educated at St Catharine's College, Cambridge (BA English, MA). He joined the Order of Preachers in 1985 and was ordained a Priest in the Roman Catholic Church in 1990.

He read Classical Moderations and Literae Humaniores at Corpus Christi College, Oxford, where he was awarded the Haigh Prize. After a period as Chaplain to the University of Leicester he became Assistant Chaplain at Fisher House, Cambridge. He completed a MPhil at Jesus College, Cambridge. Returning to Corpus, he studied for a DPhil, producing a thesis entitled The Christian promotion and practice of almsgiving in the later Roman Empire: (313-450), which was supervised by Averil Cameron and Peter Garnsey. It formed the basis of his book Almsgiving in the later Roman Empire: Christian promotion and practice (313-450) (Oxford; New York: Oxford University Press, 2006).

He became Regent of Blackfriars, Oxford in September 2004, and is Chair of the advisory board of its Las Casas Institute on ethics, governance and social justice. His second book, Asceticism in the Graeco-Roman World, has been published by Cambridge University Press (2009).

He is an adviser to the Oxford Centre for Animal Ethics. He has been a lecturer at the Centre for Christianity and Culture (Regent's Park College, Oxford) and at Melbourne College of Divinity.

== Sermons ==
- Torch website

== Sources ==
- Blackfriars, Oxford webpage
- University of Oxford Annual Review 2004/05
- Oxford University Gazette
