= Blackfriars, Oxford =

Dominican priory in Oxford, England

Blackfriars Priory
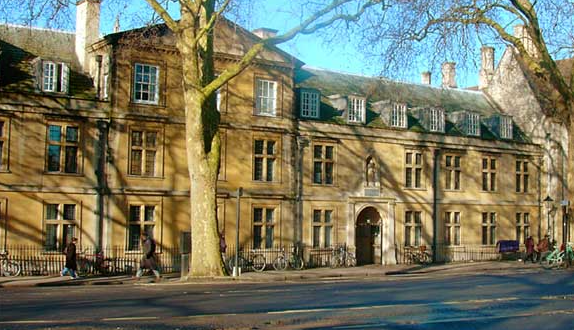
- Exterior of Blackfriars on St Giles'

- Location within Oxford city centre

Monastery information
- Full name: Priory of the Holy Spirit
- Order: Dominican Order
- Established: 1221
- Disestablished: 1538
- Reestablished: 1921
- Dedication: Holy Spirit
- Diocese: Birmingham

People
- Founder: Bede Jarrett (1921)
- Prior: Rev. Dominic White O.P.
- Important associated figures: Thomas of Jorz; Timothy Radcliffe

Site
- Location: Oxford, England
- Coordinates: 51.756121°N 1.260206°W
- Website: Priory website

Logo of the religious community

Blackfriars Priory (formally the Priory of the Holy Spirit) is a Dominican religious community in Oxford, England. It has three primary works, the running of a bakery in Oxford city centre, the celebration of Eucharist in Blackfriars church, and the administration of two educational institutions: Blackfriars Studium, a centre of theological studies in the Roman Catholic tradition; and Blackfriars Hall, a constituent permanent private hall of the University of Oxford.

The current prior of Blackfriars is Dominic White. The name Blackfriars is commonly used in Britain to denote a house of Dominican friars, a reference to their black cappa, which forms part of their habit.

Blackfriars is located in central Oxford on St Giles', between the Ioannou Centre for Classical and Byzantine Studies and St Cross College.

== History ==
The Dominicans arrived in Oxford on 15 August 1221, at the instruction of a General Chapter meeting headed by Saint Dominic himself, little more than a week after the friar's death. As such, the hall is heir to the oldest tradition of teaching in Oxford, a tradition that precedes both the aularian houses of the next century and the collegiate houses of the rest of the University of Oxford's history. In 1236, they established a new and extensive priory in the St. Ebbes district.

Like all the monastic houses in Oxford, Blackfriars came into rapid and repeated conflict with the university authorities. With the Reformation, all monastic houses, including Blackfriars, were suppressed. The Dominicans did not return to Oxford for some 400 years, until 1921 when Blackfriars was refounded by Bede Jarrett as a religious house. The original priory building was designed by Edward Doran Webb and completed in 1929. The Dominican studium at Blackfriars had a close relationship with the university, culminating in the establishment of Blackfriars as a permanent private hall in 1994.

== Blackfriars Studium ==
Blackfriars offers those preparing for the Catholic priesthood the Baccalaureate in Sacred Theology (STB) granted by the Pontifical University of Saint Thomas Aquinas, Angelicum in Rome. It is also possible for lay men and women to begin the Angelicum's STB programme by studying in the Blackfriars Studium and to conclude the programme with at least a year's full-time study at the Angelicum.

== Notable Friars ==
- Malcolm McMahon, Archbishop of Liverpool, former Prior.
- Aidan Nichols, first John Paul II Memorial Visiting Lecturer at the University of Oxford
- Brian Davies - philosopher
- Cornelius Ernst - theologian
- Richard Finn - theology and classics scholar
- Fergus Kerr - former Prior.
- Timothy Radcliffe - former Prior, Master Emeritus of the Order of Preachers, and Cardinal

=== Burials at Blackfriars ===
- Robert Bacon (writer)
- Richard Fishacre

== Gallery ==
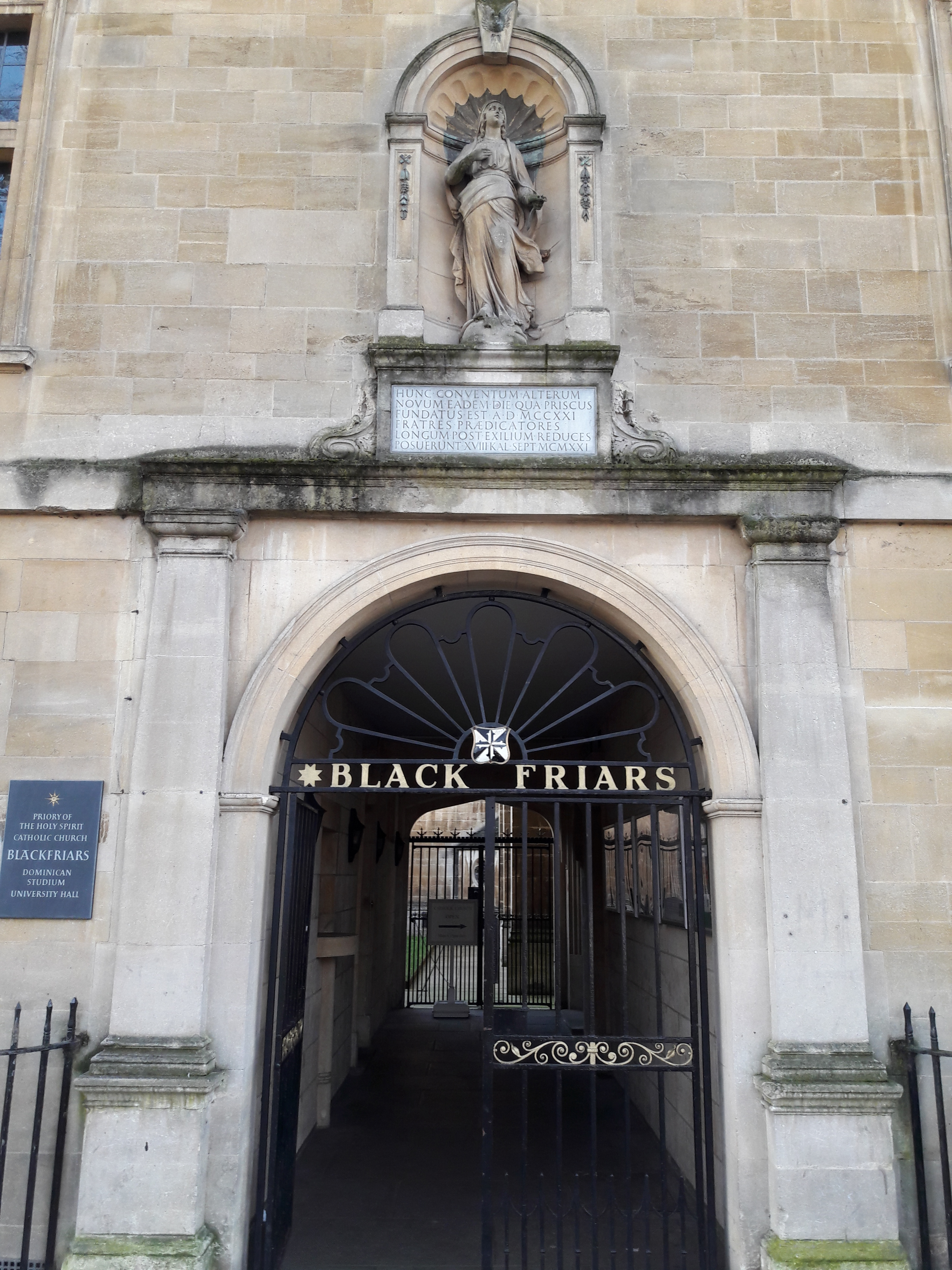
Entrance gate to the Priory surmounted by a statue of the Virgin Mary and inscription by Eric Gill

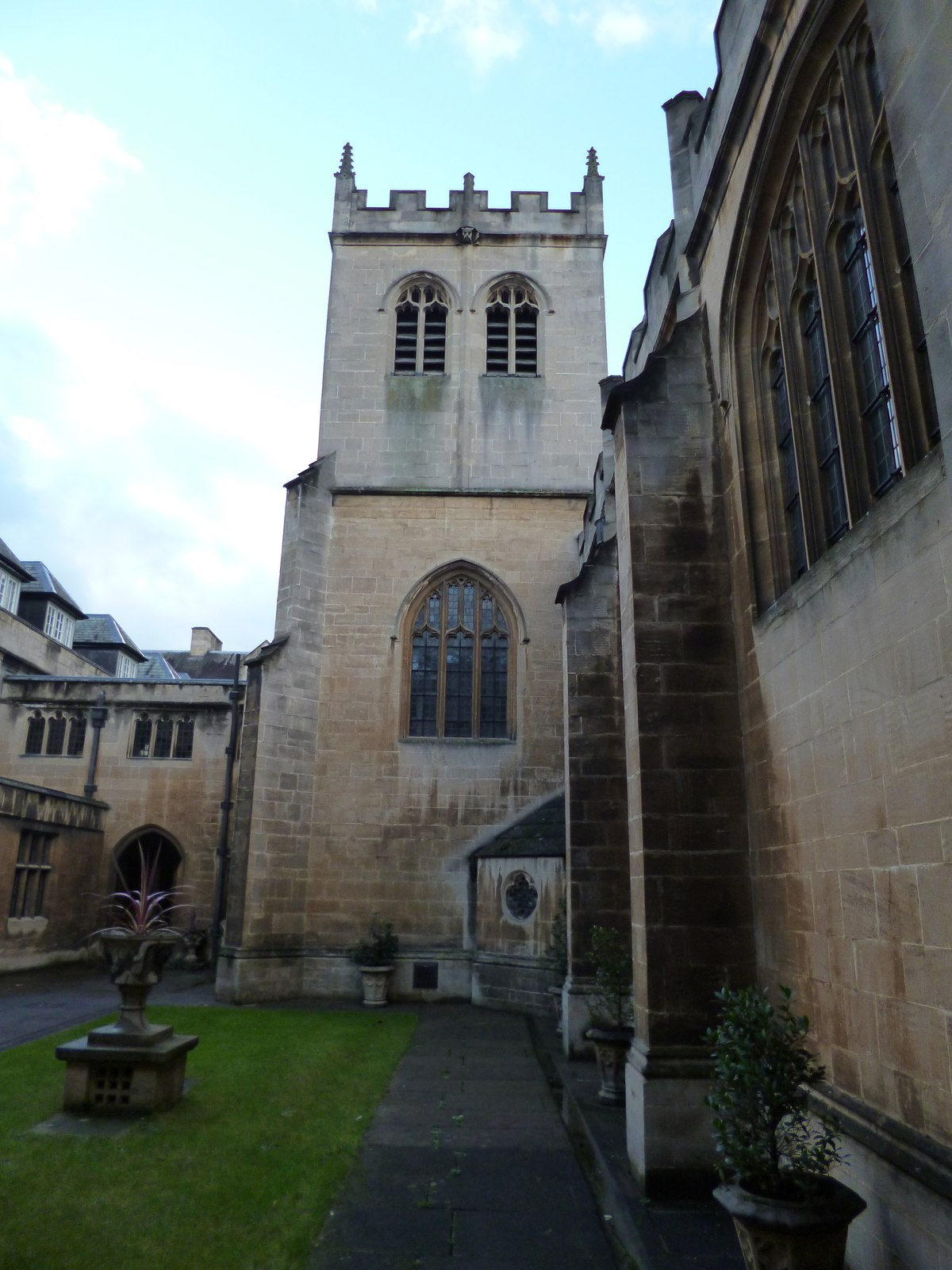
Courtyard and bell tower (prior to restoration works)

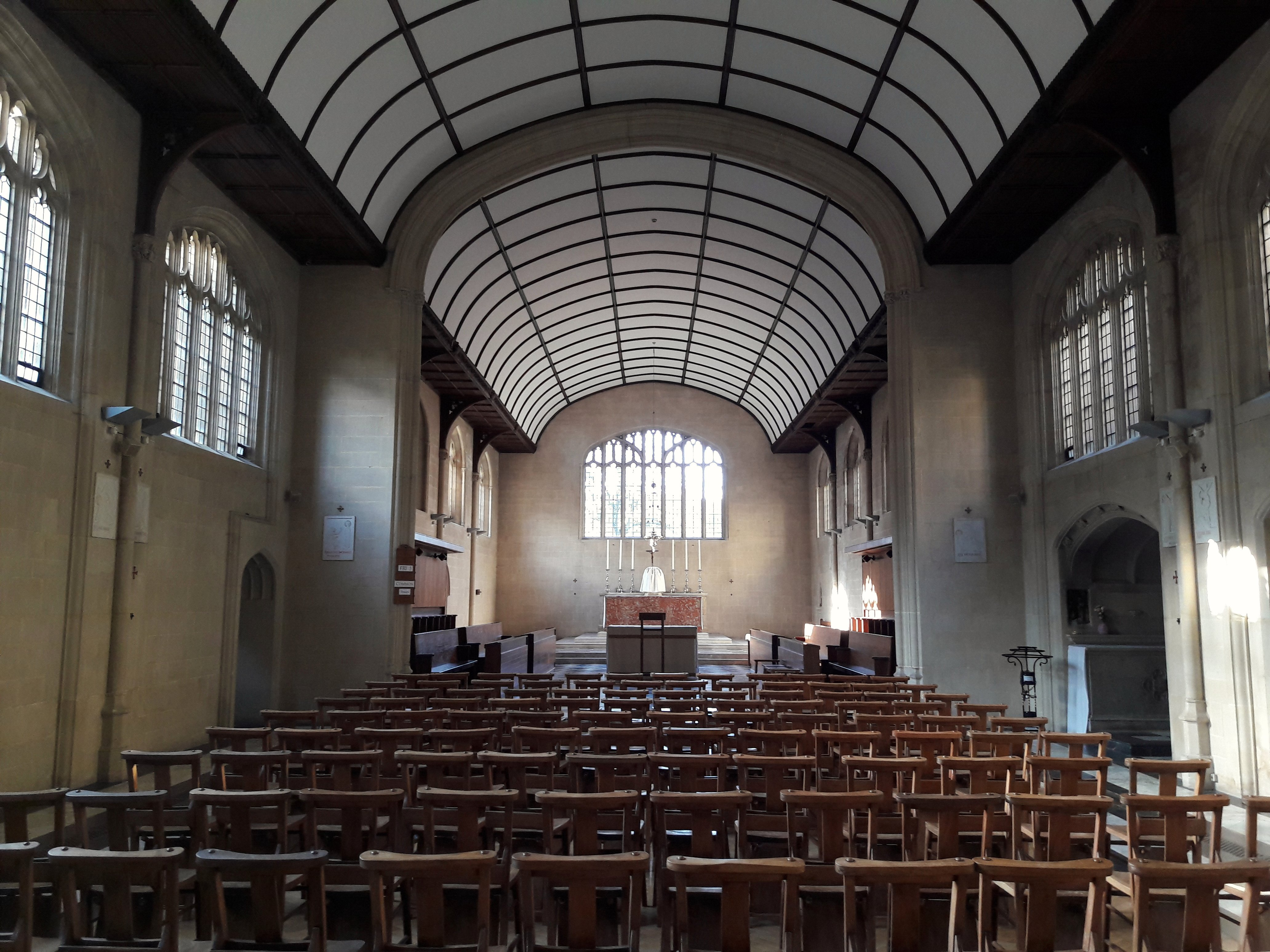
Priory Chapel

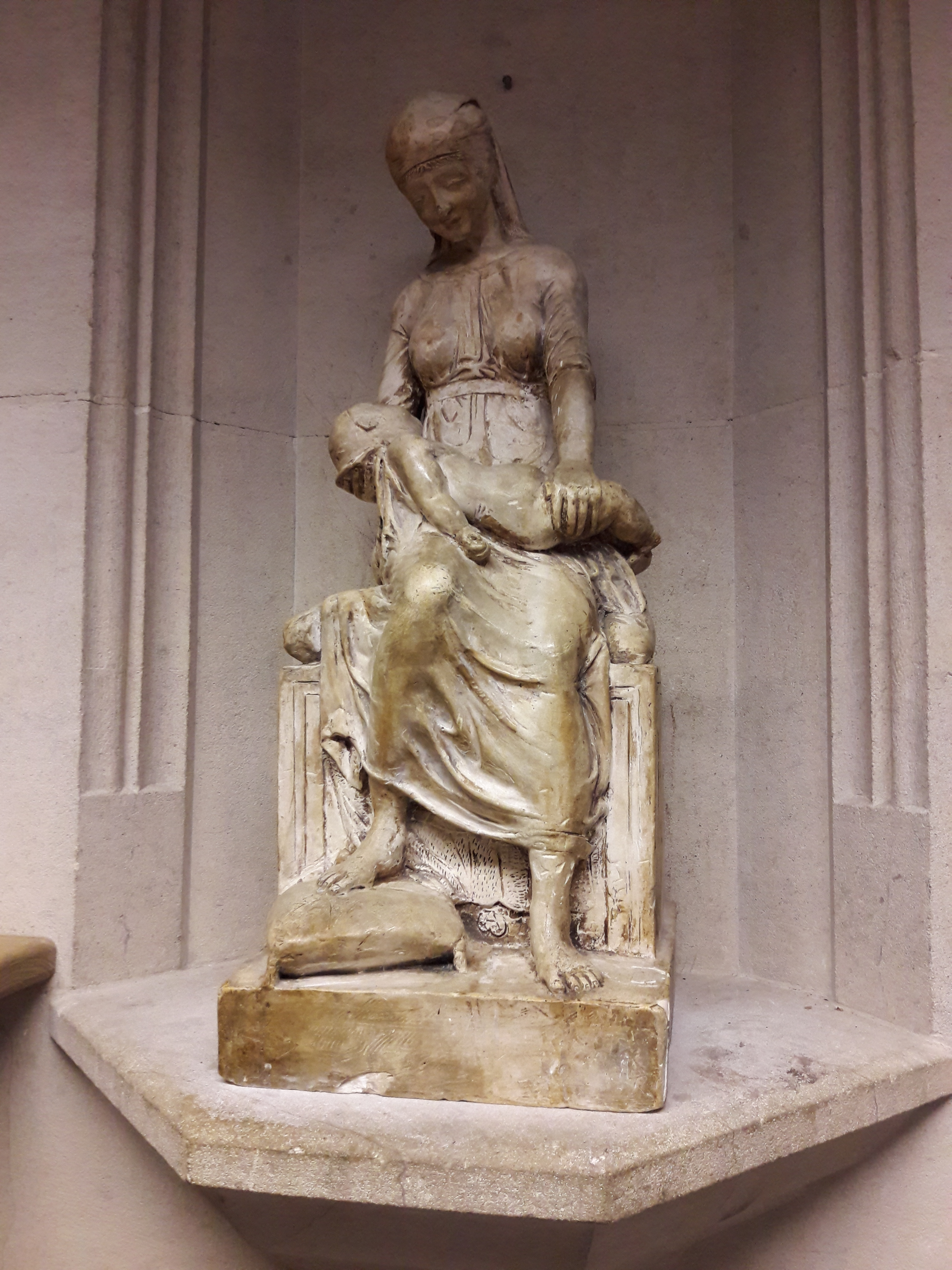
Alabaster statue of the virgin in the chapel
