= Scott MacDonald (philosopher) =

American philosopher (born 1956)

- Born: 1956 (age 69–70)

Education
- Education: Cornell University (BA, PhD); University of St Andrews (BD)
- Thesis: The Metaphysics of Goodness in Medieval Philosophy Before Aquinas (1986)
- Doctoral advisor: Norman Kretzmann

Philosophical work
- Era: Contemporary philosophy
- Region: Western philosophy
- School: Analytic philosophy Analytical Thomism
- Institutions: University of Iowa; Cornell University
- Main interests: Medieval philosophy, philosophical theology, philosophy of mind, moral psychology, philosophy of action, free will, moral responsibility

Scott MacDonald (born 1956) is an American philosopher and Norma K. Regan Professor in Christian Studies at Cornell University. He is known for his works on philosophical theology.

== Books ==
- Aquinas’s Moral Theory: Essays in Honor of Norman Kretzmann, editor with Eleonore Stump, Cornell University Press 1999
- Being and Goodness: The Concept of the Good in Metaphysics and Philosophical Theology (ed.), Cornell University Press 1991
