= Supposition theory =

Branch of medieval logic

Supposition theory was a branch of medieval logic that was probably aimed at giving accounts of issues similar to modern accounts of reference, plurality, tense, and modality, within an Aristotelian context. Philosophers such as John Buridan, William of Ockham, William of Sherwood, Walter Burley, Albert of Saxony, and Peter of Spain were its principal developers. By the 14th century it seems to have drifted into at least two fairly distinct theories, the theory of "supposition proper", which included an "ampliation" and is much like a theory of reference, and the theory of "modes of supposition" whose intended function is not clear.

== Supposition proper ==
Supposition was a semantic relation between a term and what that term was being used to talk about. So, for example, in the suggestion Drink another cup, the term cup is suppositing for the wine contained in the cup.

The logical suppositum of a term was the object the term referred to. (In grammar, suppositum was used in a different way). However, supposition was a different semantic relationship from signification. Signification was a conventional relationship between utterances and objects mediated by the particularities of a language. Poculum signifies in Latin what cup signifies in English. Signification is the imposition of a meaning on an utterance, but supposition is taking a meaningful term as standing in for something. According to Peter of Spain "Hence signification is prior to supposition. Neither do they belong to the same thing. For to signify belongs to an utterance, but to supposit belongs to a term already, as it were, put together out of an utterance and a signification." An easy way to see the difference is in our drink another cup example. Here cup as an utterance signifies a cup as an object, but cup as a term of the language English is being used to supposit for the wine contained in the cup.

Medieval logicians divided supposition into many different kinds; the jargons for the different kinds, their relations and what they all mean get complex, and differ greatly from logician to logician. Paul Spade's webpage has a series of helpful diagrams here. The most important division is probably between material, simple, personal, and improper supposition. A term supposits materially when it is used to stand in for an utterance or inscription, rather than for what it signifies. When I say Cup is a monosyllabic word, I am using the word cup to supposit materially for the utterance cup rather than for a piece of pottery. Material supposition is a medieval way of doing the work we would do today by using quotation marks. According to Ockham (Summa of Logic I64, 8) "Simple supposition occurs when a term supposits for an intention of the soul, but is not take significatively." The idea is that simple supposition happens when the term is standing in for a human concept rather than for the object itself. If I say Cups are an important type of pottery the term cups is not standing in for any particular cup, but for the idea of a cup in the human mind (according to Ockham, and many medieval logicians, but not according to John Buridan). Personal supposition in contrast is when the term supposits for what it signifies. If I say Pass me the cup the term cup is standing in for the object that is called a cup in English, so it is in personal supposition. A term is in improper supposition if it is suppositing for an object, but a different object than it signifies, as in my example Drink another cup.

== Modes of supposition ==
Personal supposition was further divided in types such as discrete, determinate, merely confused, and confused and distributive. In 1966 T.K. Scott proposed giving a separate name for Medieval discussions of the subvarieties of personal supposition, because he thought it was a fairly distinct issue from the other varieties of supposition. He proposed calling the subvarieties of personal supposition a theory of "modes of supposition."

The Medieval logicians give elaborate sets of syntactical rules for determining when a term supposits discretely, determinately, confusedly, or confusedly and distributively. So for example the subject of a negative claim, or indefinite one supposits determinately, but the subject of a singular claim supposits discretely, while the subject of an affirmative claim supposits confusedly and determinately. Albert of Saxony gives 15 rules for determining which type of personal supposition a term is using. Further the medieval logicians did not seem to dispute about the details of the syntactic rules for determining type of personal supposition. These rules seem to be important because they were linked to theories of descent to particulars and ascent from particulars.

When I say I want to buy a cup I've made an indefinite affirmative claim, with cup as the predicate term. Further cup is a common term, including many particular cups within it. So if I "descend to particulars" I can re-phrase my claim as I want to buy this cup or I want to buy that cup, or I want to buy that other cup - and so on for all cups. If I had an infinite disjunction of all particular cups, it could stand in for the term cup, in its simple supposition in I want to buy a cup. This is called determinate supposition. That is when I say I want to buy a cup I mean some determinate cup, but I don't necessarily know which one yet. Likewise if I say Some cup isn't a table, I could substitute This cup isn't a table, or that cup isn't a table or ...

On the other hand, if I say No cup is a table, I don't mean This cup isn't a table or that one isn't a table or ... I mean This cup isn't a table, AND that cup isn't a table, AND that other cup isn't a table, AND .... Here I am referring not to a determinate particular cup, but to all cups "fused" together, that is all cups "confusedly." This is called confused and distributive supposition.

If I say This cup is made of gold I cannot descend to a disjunction of particulars, or to a conjunction of particulars, but only because this cup is already a particular. This kind of personal supposition is called discrete supposition.

However, the predicate of a universal affirmative claim won't really fit any of these models. All coffee cups are cups does not imply All coffee cups are this cup, or all coffee cups are that cup, or ..., but still less does it imply All coffee cups are this cup, and all coffee cups are that cup, and .... On the other hand, if it happened to be the case that there was only one coffee cup left in the world, it would be true that All coffee cups are that cup, so I can validly infer from All coffee cups are that cup, to All coffee cups are cups. Here descent to disjunction fails, and descent to conjunction fails, but "ascent from particulars" is valid. This is called "merely confused supposition."

That is basically how the theory works, a much thornier problem is exactly what the theory is for. Some commentators, like Michael Loux, have suggested that the theory of ascent and descent to particulars is intended to provide truth conditions for the quantifiers. T. K. Scott has suggested that the theory of supposition proper was designed to answer the question What kind of thing are you talking about? but the theory of personal supposition was aimed at answering the question How many of them are you talking about? Paul Spade has suggested that by the 14th century the theory of modes of personal supposition wasn't aimed at anything at all anymore.

== Ampliation ==
When I say No cups are made of lead, cups supposits for all the cups that exist. But if I say Some cups were made of lead in Roman times, cups cannot just be suppositing for all the cups that exist, but for cups in the past as well. Here I am expanding the normal supposition of the terms I use. Peter of Spain says "Ampliation is the extension of a common term from a lesser supposition to a greater one." In practice, if I speak of the past, or the future, or make a modal claim, the terms I use get ampliated to supposit for past things, future things, or possible things, rather than their usual supposition for present actual things. Thus, ampliation becomes the medieval theory for explaining modal and tense logics within the theory of supposition.

== Bibliography ==
- Bos, E.P. (ed. 2013), Medieval Supposition Theory Revisited. Studies in Memory of L. M. de Rijk, Brill: Leiden.
- De Rijk, Lambertus M. (1967). Logica Modernorum. Assen: Van Gorcum.
- Dutilh Novaes, C. (2007), Formalizing Medieval Logical Theories. Suppositio, Consequentiae and Obligationes. New York: Springer.
- Dutilh Novaes, C. (2011), Supposition Theory in H. Lagerlund (ed.) Encyclopedia of Medieval Philosophy, Dordrecht: Springer, 2011, pp. 1229-1236.
- Kneale, William & Martha Kneale (1962). Development of Logic. Oxford: Clarendon Press.
- Kretzmann, Norman, Anthony Kenny & Jan Pinborg (1982). Cambridge History of Later Medieval Philosophy Cambridge: Cambridge University Press.
- McGrade, A.S. (editor), (2003). The Cambridge Companion to Medieval Philosophy, Cambridge University Press. ISBN 978-0-521-00063-5.
- Terence Parsons (2014). Articulating medieval Logic, New York: oxford University Press.
