= Bahrdorf =

- Municipality
- Coat of arms

- Location of Bahrdorf within Helmstedt district
- Interactive map of Bahrdorf
- Location within Germany Location within Lower Saxony
- Coordinates: 52°23′14″N 11°00′15″E
- Country: Germany
- State: Lower Saxony
- District: Helmstedt
- Municipal assoc.: Velpke
- Subdivisions: 4

Government
  - Mayor: Hans Hubertus Broistedt (CDU)

Area
  - Total: 40.59 km^{2} (15.67 sq mi)
- Elevation: 77 m (253 ft)

Population (2025-12-31)
  - Total: 1,742
  - Density: 42.92/km^{2} (111.2/sq mi)
- Time zone: UTC+01:00 (CET)
  - Summer (DST): UTC+02:00 (CEST)
- Postal codes: 38459
- Dialling codes: 05364
- Vehicle registration: HE
- Website: www.bahrdorf.de

Bahrdorf (German pronunciation: [ˈbaːɐ̯dɔʁf]) is a municipality in the district of Helmstedt, in Lower Saxony, Germany.

The municipality consists of four villages:

- Bahrdorf (including Blanken)
- Mackendorf (including Klinkerwerk)
- Rickensdorf
- Saalsdorf (including Altena, a manor house)
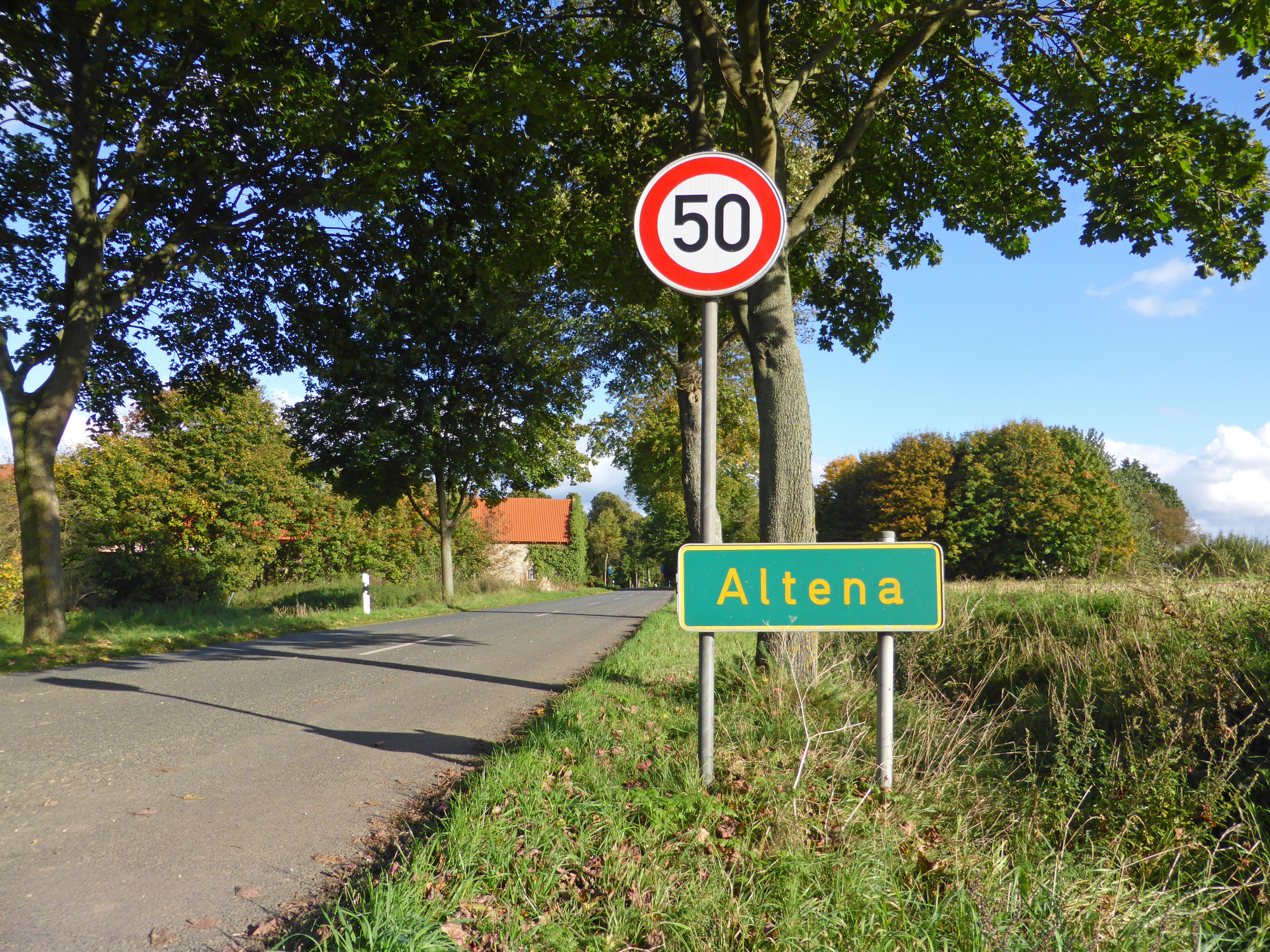
Altena

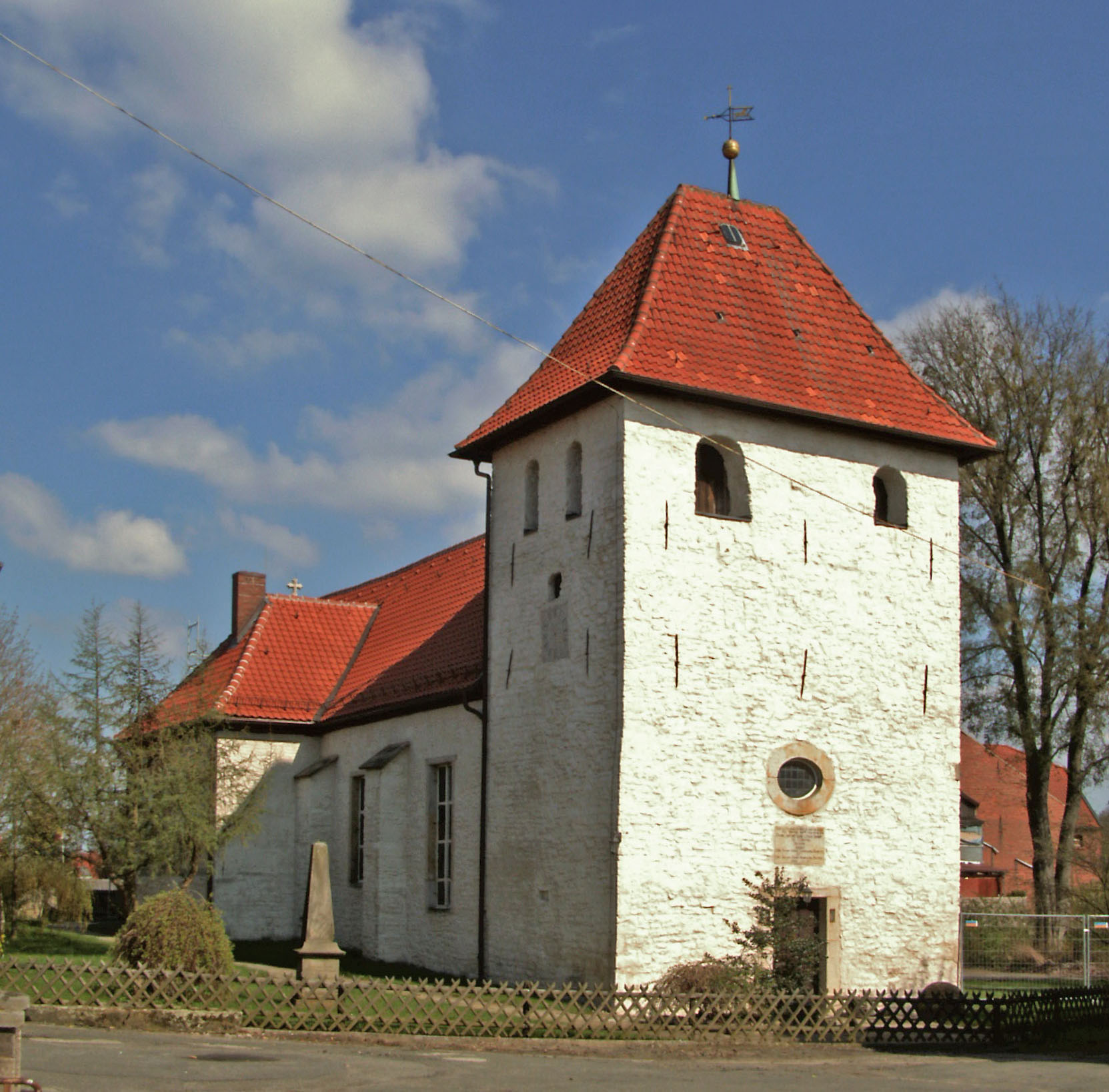
The Lutheran church in Bahrdorf

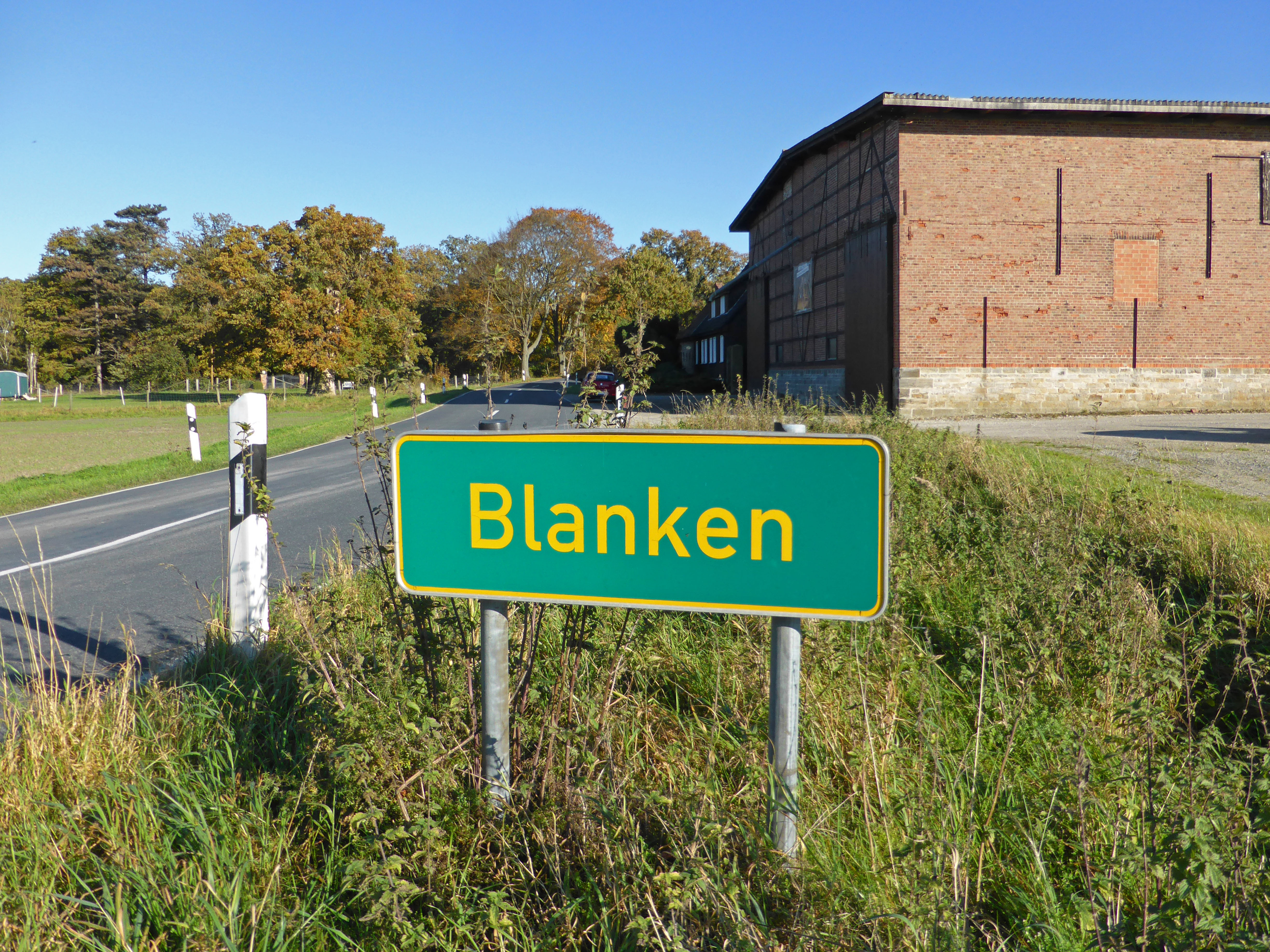
Blanken

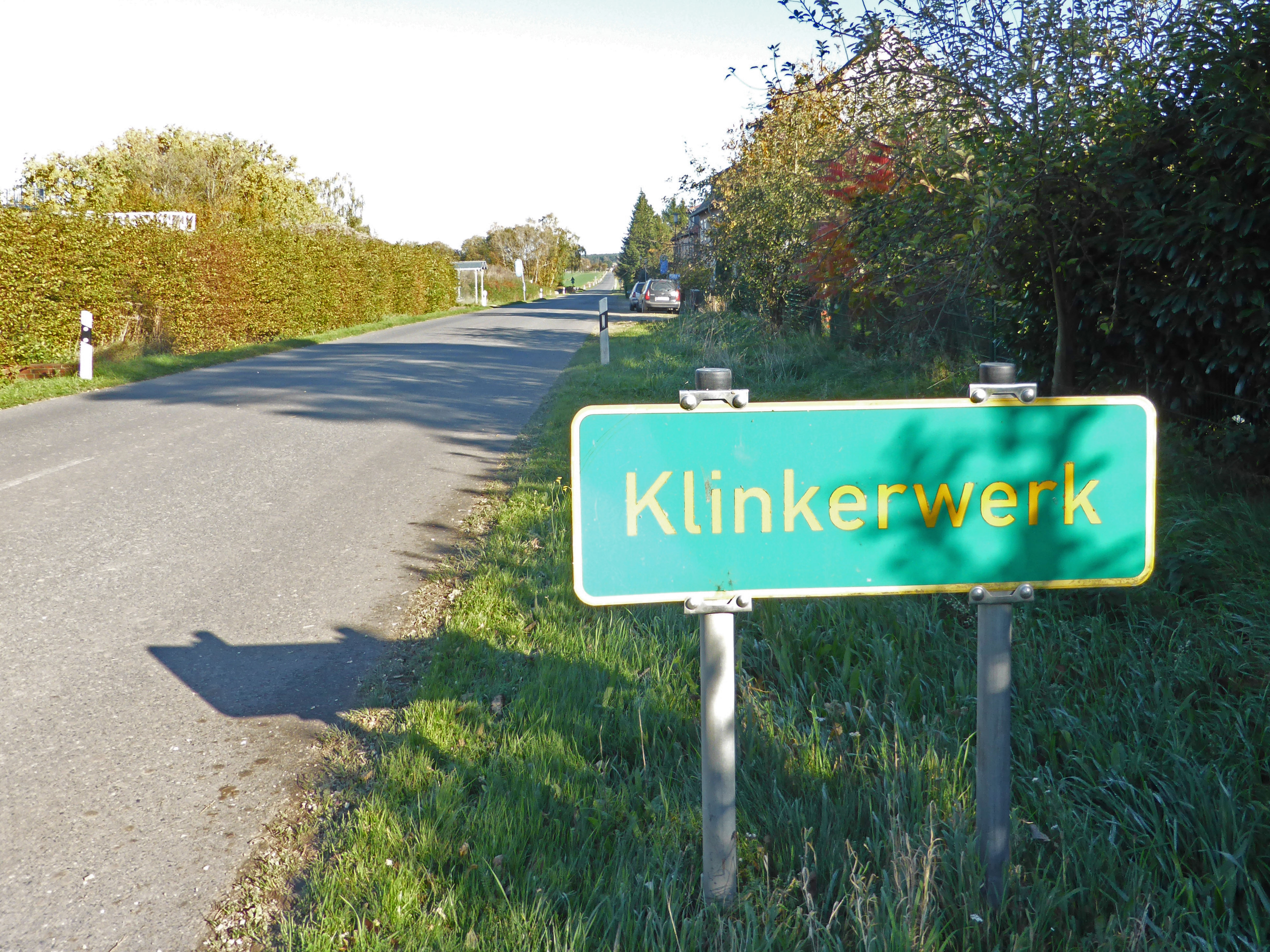
The main street in Klinkerwerk

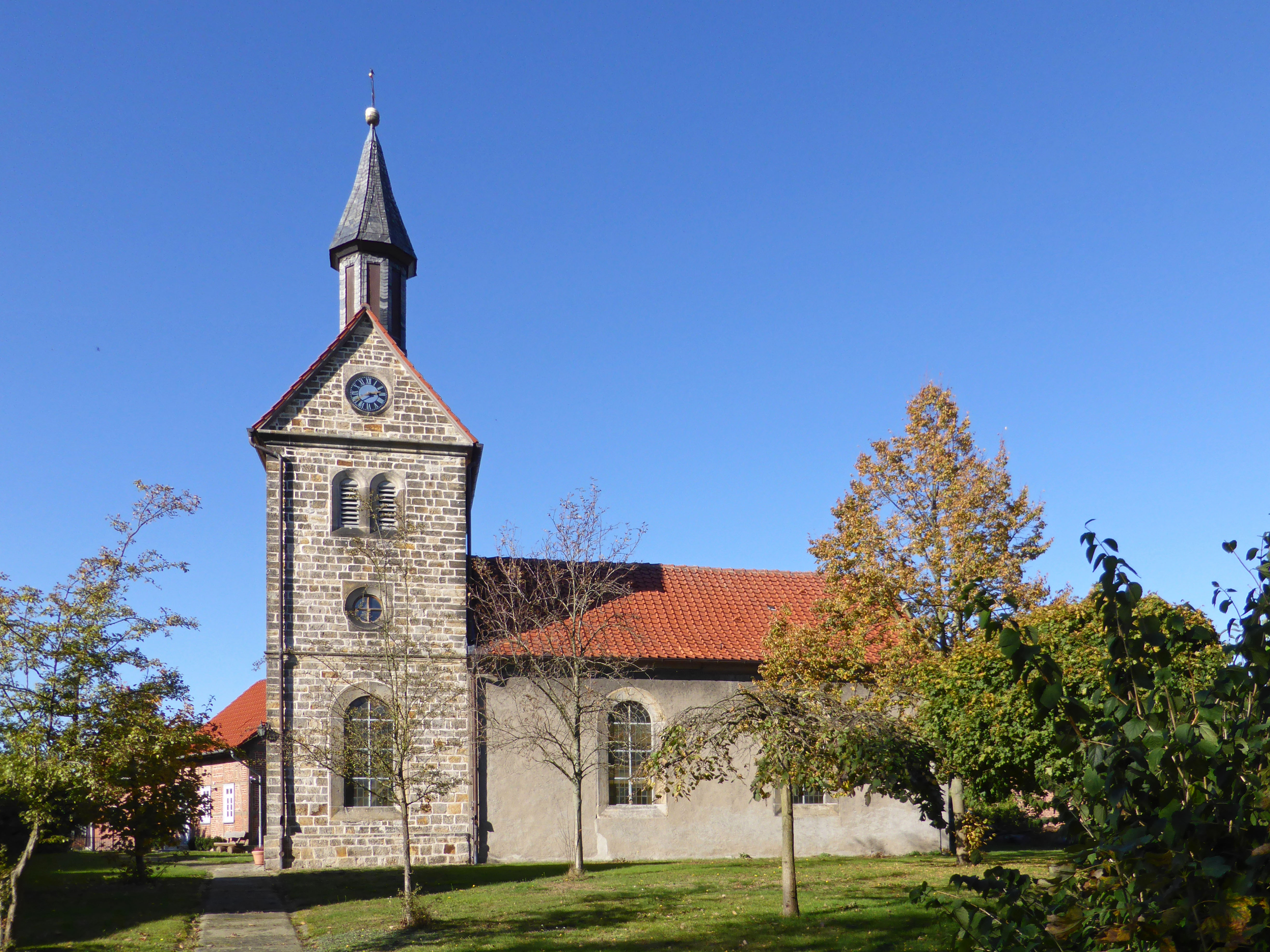
The Lutheran church in Mackendorf

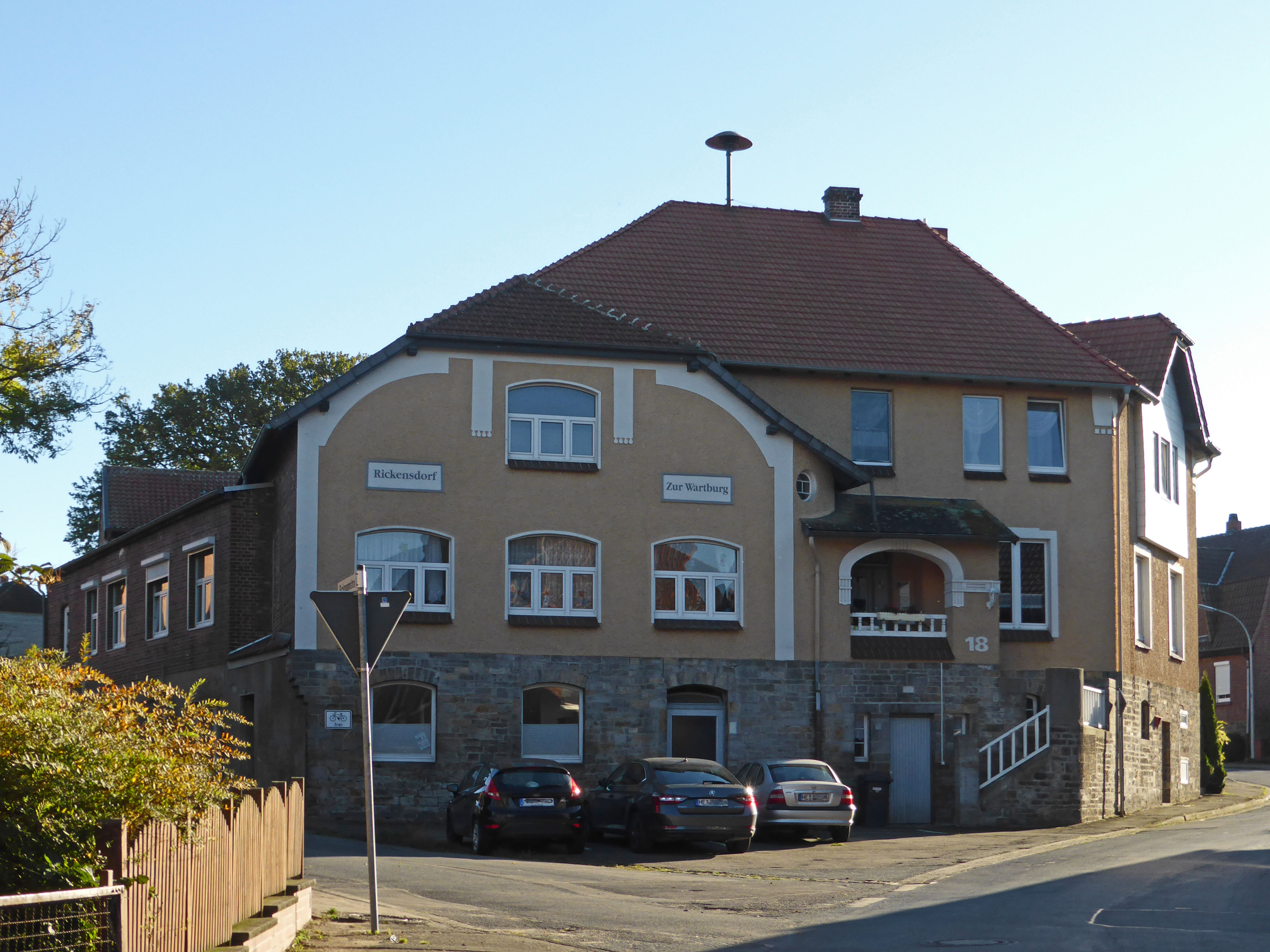
The former inn in Rickensdorf

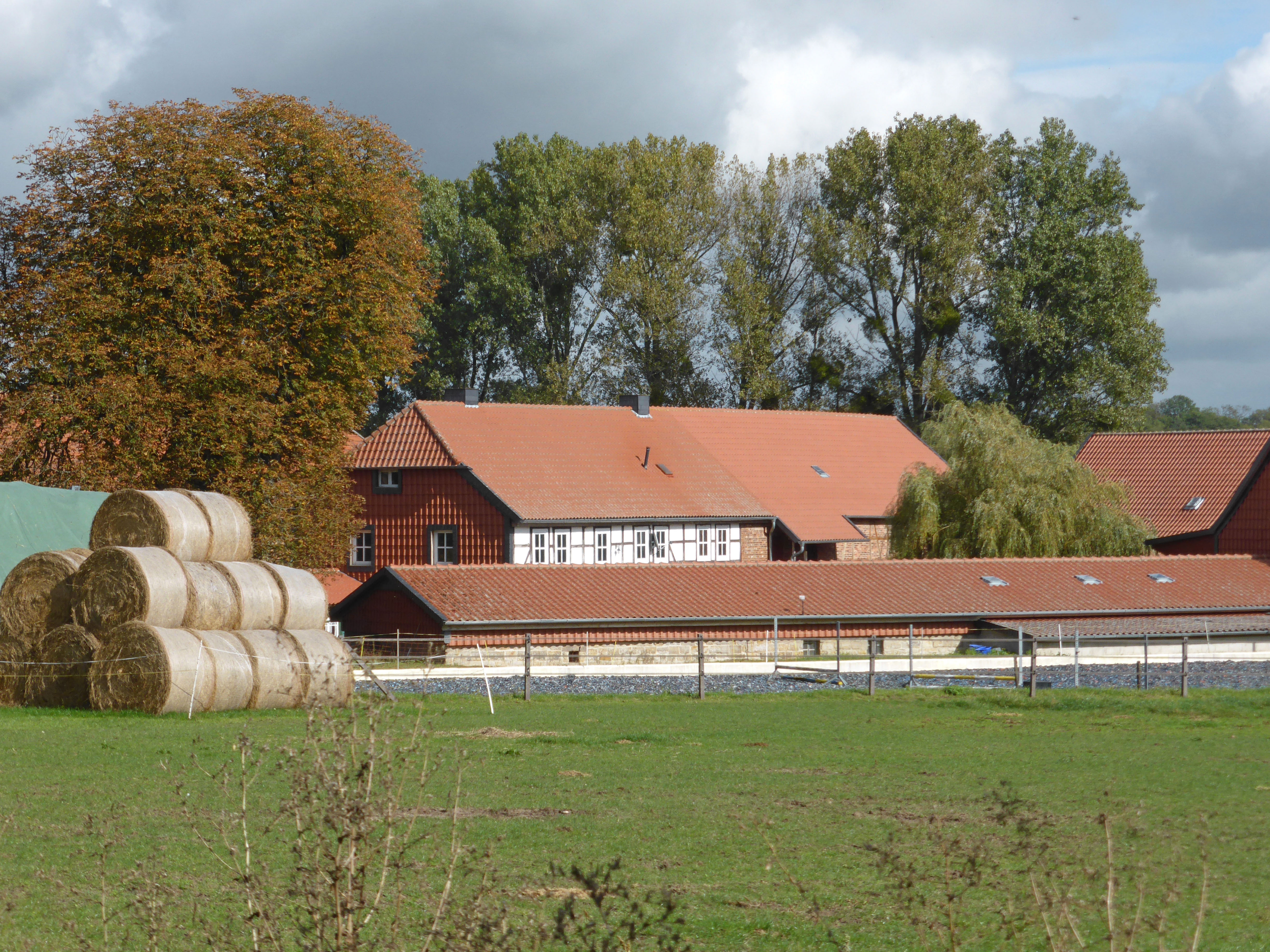
Farm in Saalsdorf

== Famous citizens ==
- Albert of Saxony, philosopher and bishop
