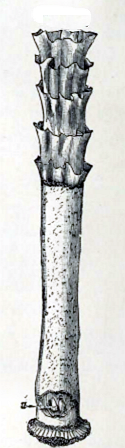
- Brechites attrahens

Scientific classification
- Domain: Eukaryota
- Kingdom: Animalia
- Phylum: Mollusca
- Class: Bivalvia
- Family: Penicillidae
- Genus: Brechites; Guettard, 1770

Synonyms
- Aspergillum Lamarck, 1818; Brechites (Brechites) Guettard, 1770; Brechites (Verpa) Röding, 1798; Clepsydra Schumacher, 1817; Penicillus (Warnea) Gray, 1858; Warnea Gray, 1858

= Brechites =

Genus of bivalves

Brechites is a genus of bivalves belonging to the family Penicillidae.

The species of this genus are found in Red Sea, Malesia and Australia.

Species:

- Brechites attrahens (Lightfoot) 1786
- Brechites australis (Chenu, 1843)
- Brechites nagahamai (Kosuge, 1979)
