= Jan Pinborg =

Jan Pinborg (1937–1982) was a renowned historian of medieval linguistics and philosophy of language, and the most famous member of the Copenhagen School of Medieval Philosophy pioneered by Heinrich Roos in the 1940s. Pinborg was a pupil of Roos.

== Works ==
- Die Entwicklung der Sprachtheorie im Mittelalter, Münster: Aschendorff, 1967.
- Logik und Semantik im Mittelalter: ein Überblick, with an afterword by von Helmut Kohlenberger, Stuttgart, Bad Cannstatt: Frommann-Holzboog, 1972. (Italian translation: Logica e Semantica nel Medioevo, Torino: Boringhieri, 1984.)
- Medieval Semantics: Selected Studies on Medieval Logic and Grammar, edited by Sten Ebbesen, London: Variorum Reprints, 1984.
- Jan Pinborg (ed.), The Logic of John Buridan: Acts of the 3rd European Symposium on Medieval Logic and Semantics, Copenhagen, 16-21 November 1975, Copenhagen: Museum Tusculanum, 1976.

He was a co-editor, along with Norman Kretzmann and Anthony Kenny, of The Cambridge History of Later Medieval Philosophy (1982).

== Sources and further reading ==
- Norman Kretzmann, Anthony Kenny, and Jan Pinborg, (eds), with Eleanor Stump, associate editor. The Cambridge History of Later Medieval Philosophy: From the Rediscovery of Aristotle to the Disintegration of Scholasticism, 1100-1600, New York: Cambridge University Press, 1982.
- Norman Kretzmann (ed.). Meaning and Inference in Medieval Philosophy: Studies in Memory of Jan Pinborg, Dordrecht: Kluwer, 1988.
- G. L. Bursill-Hall, Sten Ebbesen, and Konrad Koerner (eds.). De Ortu Grammaticae: Studies in Medieval Grammar and Linguistic Theory in Honor of Jan Pinborg, Philadelphia: J. Benjamins, 1990.
