= Jan A. Aertsen =

Dutch philosopher and theologian

- Born: 7 September 1938; Amsterdam, Netherlands
- Died: 7 January 2016 (aged 77)

Academic background
- Education: Vrije Universiteit Amsterdam (PhD)

Academic work
- Discipline: Philosophy; Theology
- Sub-discipline: Thomism
- Institutions: University of Cologne; Vrije Universiteit Amsterdam

Jan Adrianus Aertsen (7 September 1938 – 7 January 2016) was a Dutch philosopher and theologian. Born in Amsterdam, Aertsen received his PhD title at the Vrije Universiteit Amsterdam and taught there from 1984 up to his death. From 1993 to 2004, he served as a professor at the University of Cologne, and was the founding director of Thomas Instituut te Utrecht. He wrote several works on Thomism, starting from his doctoral thesis, Nature and Creature. Thomas Aquinas’s Way of Thought (1988), published in Dutch four years later.
