= Lumen Veritatis =

Quarterly peer-reviewed academic journal

- Discipline: Theology, philosophy
- Language: Portuguese

Publication details
- History: 2007–present
- Publisher: St. Thomas Aquinas Institute of Theology, Aristotelian-Thomistic Institute of Philosophy in Brazil (Brazil)
- Frequency: Quarterly

Standard abbreviations
- ISO 4: Lumen Verit.

Indexing
- ISSN: 1981-9390
- OCLC no.: 863113448

Links
- Journal homepage

Lumen Veritatis is a quarterly peer-reviewed academic journal published by the St. Thomas Aquinas Institute of Theology and the Aristotelian-Thomistic Institute of Philosophy in Brazil. Its covers the study of theology and philosophy in a Thomistic perspective in a critical dialogue with other philosophical schools.
