= Eleonore Stump =

American philosopher (born 1947)

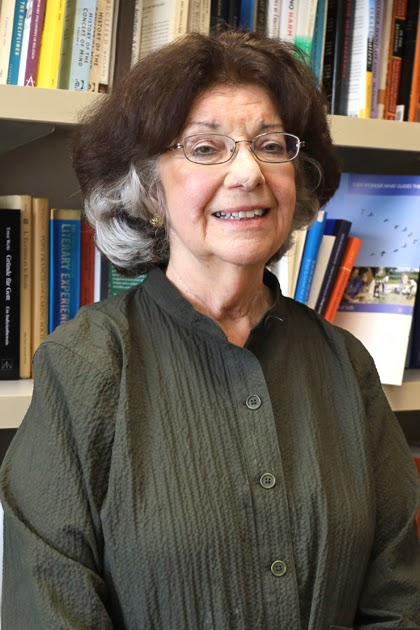
Eleonore Stump

Eleonore Stump (born August 9, 1947) is an American philosopher and the Robert J. Henle Professor of Philosophy at Saint Louis University, where she has taught since 1992.

== Biography ==
Eleonore Stump is the Robert J. Henle Professor of Philosophy at Saint Louis University, where she has taught since 1992. She received a B.A. in classical languages from Grinnell College (1969), where she was valedictorian and received the Archibald Prize for scholarship; she has an M.A. in Biblical Studies (New Testament) from Harvard University (1971), and M.A./Ph.D. in Medieval Studies (Medieval Philosophy) from Cornell University (1975) Her doctoral advisor was Norman Kretzmann. Before coming to Saint Louis University, she taught at Oberlin College, Virginia Polytechnic and State University, and Notre Dame.

She has published extensively in philosophy of religion, contemporary metaphysics, and medieval philosophy. Among her many books are Aquinas (2003), Wandering in Darkness: Narrative and the Problem of Suffering (2010), The God of the Bible and the God of the Philosophers (2016), Atonement (2018), The Image of God: The Problem of Evil and the Problem of Mourning (2022), and Grains of Wheat: Suffering and Biblical Narratives (2024). Her work has been translated into Polish, Russian, Chinese, Swedish, Italian, German, Spanish, Portuguese and French.

Among other named lectures, she has given the Gifford Lectures (Aberdeen, 2003), the Wilde lectures (Oxford, 2006), the Stewart lectures (Princeton, 2009), and the Stanton lectures (Cambridge, 2018), and the Dewey lecture (American Philosophical Association, Central Division, 2023).

She has received grants from the Danforth Foundation, the Mellon Foundation, the National Endowment for the Humanities, the American Association of University Women, the National Humanities Center, and the Pew Charitable Trust. Together with John Greco, she has held a $3.3 million grant from the John Templeton Foundation for a project on intellectual humility. In addition, she has received several awards for her teaching, including the Robert Foster Cherry Award for Great Teaching from Baylor University.

She holds honorary doctorates from Marquette University (2006), Tilburg University (2017), Austral University in Buenos Aires (2021), and the Hochschule fuer Philosophie in Munich (2024). In 2013, the American Catholic Philosophical Association awarded her the Aquinas Medal.

She is past president of the Society of Christian Philosophers, Philosophers in Jesuit Education, the American Catholic Philosophical Association, and the American Philosophical Association, Central Division. She is a member of the American Academy of Arts and Sciences.

== Bibliography ==
- Stump, Eleonore (1978). Boethius's De topicis differentiis. Ithaca: Cornell University Press.
- Stump, Eleonore (1988). Boethius's In Ciceronis Topica. Ithaca: Cornell University Press.
- Stump, Eleonore (1989). Dialectic and Its Place in the Development of Medieval Logic (collected essays). Ithaca: Cornell University Press.
- Stump, Eleonore (2003). Aquinas. London: Routledge.
- Stump, Eleonore (2010). Wandering in Darkness: Narrative and the Problem of Suffering. Oxford: Oxford University Press.
- Stump, Eleonore (2016). The God of the Bible and the God of the Philosophers, Aquinas Lecture. Milwaukee: Marquette University Press.
- Stump, Eleonore (2018). Atonement. Oxford: Oxford University Press.
- Stump, Eleonore (2022). The Image of God: The Problem of Evil and the Problem of Mourning. Oxford: Oxford University Press.
- Stump, Eleonore (2023). Philosophical Theology and the Knowledge of Persons (collected essays). Eugene: Wipf and Stock.
- Stump, Eleonore (2024). Grains of Wheat: Suffering and Biblical Narratives. Oxford: Oxford University Press.

== See also ==
- Analytical Thomism
