= Brian Davies (philosopher) =

British philosopher, Catholic priest, and friar (born 1951)

The Reverend Brian Davies OP
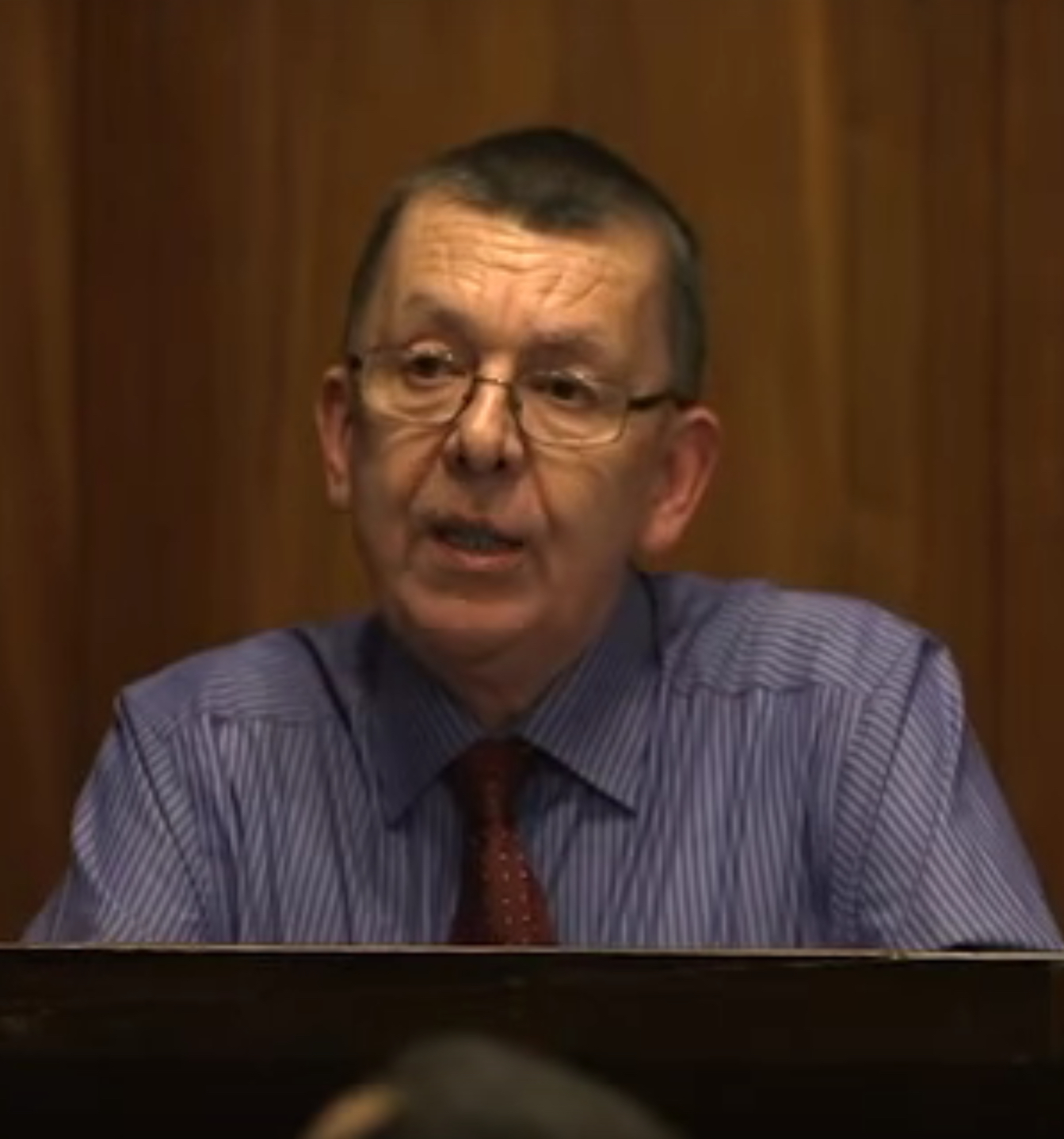
- Born: Brian Evan Anthony Davies; 7 July 1951 (age 75)

Ecclesiastical career
- Religion: Christianity (Roman Catholic)
- Church: Latin Church

Academic background
- Education: University of Bristol (BA); King's College London (MTh)
- Thesis: Reasons and Belief (1976)
- Influences: G. E. M. Anscombe; Thomas Aquinas; Peter Geach; Herbert McCabe; Alvin Plantinga; Richard Swinburne

Academic work
- Discipline: Philosophy; theology
- Sub-discipline: Medieval philosophy; philosophy of religion
- School or tradition: Analytical Thomism
- Institutions: Blackfriars, Oxford; University of Oxford; Fordham University
- Doctoral students: Mark Wynn

Brian Evan Anthony Davies OP (born 7 July 1951) is a British philosopher, Roman Catholic priest, and friar. He is Distinguished Professor of Philosophy, Fordham University since 1995. His An Introduction to the Philosophy of Religion is in its fourth English edition and has been translated into five languages.

== Education ==
Brian Davies studied theology at the University of Bristol (BA 1972) and undertook graduate studies at King's College London (MTh, 1973; Tutorial Assistant, 1974–6; PhD, 1976).

== Teaching ==
He spent the period 1982–95 at the University of Oxford. Throughout those years he was a lecturer in theology and philosophy at Blackfriars, Oxford. Davies was also Tutor in Theology, St Benet's Hall and a member of the Faculty of Theology (1983–95); Regent of Studies of the English Dominican Province (1988–95); University Research Lecturer (1993–95); and member of the Sub-Faculty of Philosophy (1994–95).

In 1994 Davies was appointed Regent of Blackfriars and, as a Head of House, received the degree of Master of Arts by Special Decree by the University of Oxford. In 1995 he took up his current appointment at Fordham University. He held Visiting Professorships at the Beda College, Rome (Spring 1987 and Spring 1988), Fordham University (July–August 1987, July–August 1988, and Fall 1994), and Candler School of Theology, Emory University (Spring 1993).

== Problem of evil ==
Davies takes influence from Thomas Aquinas and is a proponent of classical theism. To solve the problem of evil, Davies has argued that God is not a created person or moral agent and is therefore not responsible for evil in the way that creatures are. God the creator and sustainer of the universe is not existent among others so cannot be expected to conform to moral standards external to himself. In 2008, Davies stated:

I want to reject the theistic and nontheistic discussions of God and evil that start from the presupposition that God is the sort of thing I am, a moral agent subject to duties and obligations [...] If someone said, 'Oh well, the tsunamis prove that God isn’t doing what he ought to do,' I am going to describe that comment as very misguided since it does not make sense to suggest that God is subject to moral obligations.

== Notable writings and editorial work ==
As author

- An Introduction to the Philosophy of Religion (Oxford University Press: Oxford, 1982; revised edition, 1993; 3rd edition 2003; 4th edition 2020; Korean translation, 1996; Romanian translation, 1996; Ukrainian translation, 1996; Hungarian translation, 1999; Polish translation 2006)
- Thinking About God (Geoffrey Chapman: London, 1985)
- The Thought of Thomas Aquinas (Oxford University Press: Oxford, 1992)
- Aquinas (Continuum: London and New York, 2002)
- Aquinas: An Introduction (Continuum: London and New York, 2003)
- The Reality of God and the Problem of Evil (Continuum: London and New York, 2006)
- Thomas Aquinas on God and Evil (Oxford University Press: Oxford, 2011)
- Thomas Aquinas's Summa Theologiae: A Guide and Commentary (Oxford University Press: Oxford, 2014)
- Thomas Aquinas's Summa Contra Gentiles: A Guide and Commentary (Oxford University Press: Oxford, 2016)

He has also contributed:

- more than twenty chapters or articles to books
- more than seventy articles in scholarly journals including New Blackfriars, The Downside Review, The Clergy Review, Irish Theological Quarterly, The Monist, Philosophy, Theology, Cogito, International Philosophical Quarterly, Sophia, Revue Internationale de Philosophie, and Think
- book reviews in Anglican Theological Review, Faith and Philosophy, Journal of Theological Studies, The Philosophical Review, Theology Today, and The Thomist
- numerous contributions in The Times, The Tablet, and the Times Literary Supplement.

As editor

- Language, Meaning and God: Essays in honour of Herbert McCabe O.P. (Geoffrey Chapman: London, 1987)
- With G.R. Evans, Anselm of Canterbury: The Major Works (Oxford University Press: Oxford, 1998)
- Philosophy of Religion: A Guide to the Subject (Geoffrey Chapman: London, 1998)
- Philosophy of Religion: A Guide and Anthology (Oxford University Press: Oxford, 2000)
- The De Malo of Thomas Aquinas (tr. Richard Regan; ed., Introduction, and Notes Brian Davies) (Oxford University Press: New York and Oxford, 2001)
- Thomas Aquinas: Contemporary Philosophical Perspectives (Oxford University Press: New York and Oxford, 2002)
- With Brian Leftow, The Cambridge Companion to Anselm (Cambridge University Press: Cambridge, 2004)
- Aquinas's “Summa Theologiae”: Critical Essays (Rowman and Littlefield: Lanham, Boulder, New York, Toronto, Oxford, 2005)
- With Brian Leftow, Aquinas: “Summa Theologiae”, Questions on God (Cambridge University Press: Cambridge 2006)
- With Eleonore Stump, The Oxford Handbook of Aquinas (Oxford University Press, 2012)

Davies also edits the Outstanding Christian Thinkers series (Continuum: London and New York, 1989–2004), having overseen the publication of twenty-eight volumes, and of the Great Medieval Thinkers, published by Oxford University Press. He was Book Reviews Editor for New Blackfriars (1979–95) and a member of the editorial board for Religious Studies (2000–6). He is now Associate European Editor (since 1992) for the International Philosophical Quarterly.

As literary executor for the late Herbert McCabe (died 2001), Davies edited and published five volumes of work that McCabe left at the time of his death: God Still Matters (Continuum: London and New York, 2002); God, Christ and Us (Continuum: London and New York, 2003); The Good Life: Ethics and the Pursuit of Happiness (Continuum: London and New York, 2005); Faith Within Reason (Continuum: London and New York, 2007); and On Aquinas (Continuum: London and New York, 2008).

== Bibliography ==
=== Books ===
- An introduction to the philosophy of religion. Oxford: Oxford University Press. 1982. (Note: Revised edition, 1993; 3rd edition 2003; 4th edition 2020; Korean translation, 1996; Romanian translation, 1996; Ukrainian translation, 1996; Hungarian translation, 1999; Polish translation 2006))
- Thinking About God (Geoffrey Chapman: London, 1985)
- The Thought of Thomas Aquinas (Oxford University Press: Oxford, 1992)
- Aquinas (Continuum: London and New York, 2002)
- Aquinas: An Introduction (Continuum: London and New York, 2003)
- The Reality of God and the Problem of Evil (Continuum: London and New York, 2006)
- Thomas Aquinas on God and Evil (Oxford University Press: Oxford, 2011)
- Thomas Aquinas's Summa Theologiae: A Guide and Commentary (Oxford University Press: Oxford, 2014)
- Thomas Aquinas's Summa Contra Gentiles: A Guide and Commentary (Oxford University Press: Oxford, 2016)

Edited

- Language, Meaning and God: Essays in honour of Herbert McCabe O.P. (Geoffrey Chapman: London, 1987)
- With G.R. Evans, Anselm of Canterbury: The Major Works (Oxford University Press: Oxford, 1998)
- Philosophy of Religion: A Guide to the Subject (Geoffrey Chapman: London, 1998)
- Philosophy of Religion: A Guide and Anthology (Oxford University Press: Oxford, 2000)
- The De Malo of Thomas Aquinas (tr. Richard Regan; ed., Introduction, and Notes Brian Davies) (Oxford University Press: New York and Oxford, 2001)
- Thomas Aquinas: Contemporary Philosophical Perspectives (Oxford University Press: New York and Oxford, 2002)
- With Brian Leftow, The Cambridge Companion to Anselm (Cambridge University Press: Cambridge, 2004)
- Aquinas's “Summa Theologiae”: Critical Essays (Rowman and Littlefield: Lanham, Boulder, New York, Toronto, Oxford, 2005)
- With Brian Leftow, Aquinas: “Summa Theologiae”, Questions on God (Cambridge University Press: Cambridge 2006)
- With Eleonore Stump, The Oxford Handbook of Aquinas (Oxford University Press, 2012)

=== Articles ===
- "Comment : God's sex or gender". New Blackfriars. 102 (1098): 157–159. March 2021. doi:10.1111/nbfr.12637.
- "Comment : the hiddenness of God". New Blackfriars. 102 (1102): 853–856. November 2021. doi:10.1111/nbfr.12705.

———————
