= Water thief =

Three different devices for manipulating water

One of many brands of water thief (a synthetic rubber fitting that attaches to an unthreaded faucet on one end and a common garden hose on the other) commonly available

The term "water thief" refers to three devices – one ancient and two modern.

1. A water thief is a synthetic rubber fitting that attaches to an unthreaded faucet (American English) / tap (British English) on one end and a common garden hose on the other. It is commonly used to fill fresh water tanks in recreational vehicles when a threaded hose bib is not available.
2. A water thief allows firefighters to break down one larger line into several smaller ones, each with independent control of water flow at the valve.
3. Another device, used in antiquity, was called a "water thief" or "clepsydra". Carl Sagan described it in his book Cosmos as "a brazen sphere with an open neck and small holes in the bottom, it is filled by immersing it in water. If you pull it out with the neck uncovered, the water pours out of the holes, making a small shower. But if you pull it out properly, with the neck covered, the water is retained in the sphere until you lift your thumb."
