= New Blackfriars =

- Discipline: Theology, philosophy
- Language: English
- Edited by: Brian Davies

Publication details
- History: 1920–present
- Publisher: Cambridge University Press for the Provincial Council of the English Province of the Order of Preachers (United Kingdom)
- Frequency: Bi-monthly

Standard abbreviations
- ISO 4: New Blackfriars

Indexing
- ISSN: 1741-2005

Links
- Journal homepage

New Blackfriars is an academic journal published by Cambridge University Press that is formally linked with the English Province of the Order of Preachers (also known as the Dominican Order).

The journal was launched in 1920 as a monthly review called Blackfriars: A Monthly Review Edited by the English Dominicans; for a period it also contained The Catholic Review, which, together with the Hawkesyard Review, Blackfriars superseded. It was published under its original name until 1965, when it was renamed New Blackfriars.
