= Norman Kretzmann =

American philosopher (1928–1998)

- Born: Norman J. Kretzmann; 4 November 1928; Chicago, Illinois, U.S.
- Died: 1 August 1998 (aged 69); Ithaca, New York, U.S.

Education
- Education: Valparaiso University (BA, 1949); Johns Hopkins University (PhD, 1953)
- Doctoral advisor: George Boas

Philosophical work
- Era: 20th-century philosophy
- Region: Western philosophy
- School: Analytic philosophy Analytical Thomism
- Institutions: Bryn Mawr College; Ohio State University; University of Illinois Urbana-Champaign; Cornell University
- Doctoral students: Scott MacDonald; Eleonore Stump
- Main interests: Medieval philosophy, philosophy of religion, logic, philosophy of language, natural theology
- Notable ideas: Eternal–temporal simultaneity

Norman J. Kretzmann (4 November 1928 – 1 August 1998) was an American philosopher at Cornell University. He specialised in the history of medieval philosophy and the philosophy of religion.

== Biography ==
Kretzmann joined Cornell's Department of Philosophy in 1966. His work as a teacher and scholar was recognized in 1970, when he was appointed Chairman of the Department of Philosophy, and in 1977 when he was elected a Susan Linn Sage Professor of Philosophy by the University Board of Trustees. In 1992, he received a Graduate Teaching Award from the Northeastern Association of Graduate Deans for his excellence and creativity in the teaching of graduate students. He became a Susan Linn Sage Professor Emeritus in 1995. He published numerous books, articles, essays, and editions of medieval texts. He served as the principal editor of The Cambridge History of Later Medieval Philosophy (1982), and as an editor of the Routledge Encyclopedia of Philosophy.

Kretzmann was brought up a Lutheran and descended from a long line of Lutheran pastors, but he lost his Lutheran faith while at college. He was for many years an active member of the Society of Christian Philosophers. In his early sixties, he was diagnosed with multiple myeloma and given less than two years to live; in the event, he lived seven more years and completed two volumes of his projected three-volume work on Aquinas's Summa contra Gentiles.
