= Philosophy of language =

Branch of philosophy

Philosophy of language, or sometimes linguistic philosophy, is the study of the nature of language. It investigates the relationship between language, language users, and the world. Investigations may include inquiry into the nature of meaning, indexicality, intentionality, reference, the constitution of sentences, concepts, learning, and thought.

Gottlob Frege and Bertrand Russell were pivotal figures in analytic philosophy's "linguistic turn". These writers were followed by Ludwig Wittgenstein (Tractatus Logico-Philosophicus), the Vienna Circle, logical positivists, and Willard Van Orman Quine.

== History ==
=== Ancient philosophy ===
In the West, inquiry into language stretches back to the 5th century BC with philosophers such as Socrates, Plato, Aristotle, and the Stoics. Linguistic speculation predated systematic descriptions of grammar which emerged c. the 5th century BC in India and c. the 3rd century BC in Greece.

In the dialogue Cratylus, Plato considers the question of whether the names of things are determined by convention or by nature. He criticizes conventionalism as leading to the bizarre consequence that, as anything can be conventionally denominated by any name, there can hence be neither fitting, or correct, names, nor unfitting or incorrect ones—yet it seems, intuitively, that such "incorrect" names are indeed possible: e.g., if Theophilus means "god-beloved", it seems inappropriate for anyone who is not, in fact, very pious at all. Plato argues, further, that primitive (as opposed to derived) names have a natural correctness, because each phoneme represents basic ideas or sentiments; for example, the letter λ and its sound represent—for Plato—the idea of smoothness or softness. However, by the end of Cratylus, he seems to admit that some social conventions are also involved, and that the idea that phonemes have individual meanings is not without flaw. Plato is often considered a proponent of extreme realism.

Aristotle interested himself with issues of logic, categories, and the creation of meaning. He separated all things into categories of species and genus. He thought that the meaning of a predicate was established through an abstraction of the similarities between various individual things. This theory later came to be called nominalism. However, since Aristotle took these similarities to be constituted by a real commonality of form, he is more often considered a proponent of moderate realism.

The Stoics made important contributions to the analysis of grammar, distinguishing five parts of speech: nouns, verbs, appellatives (names or epithets), conjunctions and articles. They also developed a sophisticated doctrine of the lektón associated with each sign of a language, but distinct from both the sign itself and the thing to which it refers. This lektón was the meaning or sense of every term. The complete lektón of a sentence is what we would now call its proposition. Only propositions were considered truth-bearing—meaning they could be considered true or false—while sentences were simply their vehicles of expression. Different lektá could also express things besides propositions, such as commands, questions and exclamations.

Classical Indian philosophy saw the primary debates occurring between the Nyāya school, Mīmāṃsā philosophy, and Vyākaraṇa (grammar) traditions regarding linguistic meaning. The Mīmāṃsā school developed theories on how sentences carry meaning, which is expressed through the ideas of Kumārila Bhaṭṭa who proposed abhihitānvayavāda (meaning arising from the association of expressed words) and Prabhākara who proposed anvitābhidhānavāda (words conveying meaning only in relation to a sentence's unified action). In contrast, the 5th-century grammarian Bhartṛhari puts forth a holistic model in his treatise, the Vākyapadīya, known as akhaṇḍavākyasphoṭa. In this view, words and sounds do not carry the meaning in and of themselves. It is the sentences that are the units of meaning which can be realized through an intuitive cognition known as pratibhā. He also linked language to metaphysics through his concept of Śabdādvaita, asserting that cognition is fundamentally structured by language (Śabda-Brahman).

=== Medieval philosophy ===
Medieval philosophers were greatly interested in the subtleties of language and its usage. For many scholastics, this interest was provoked by the necessity of translating Greek texts into Latin. There were several noteworthy philosophers of language in the medieval period. According to Peter J. King (though this has been disputed), Peter Abelard anticipated the modern theories of reference. Also, William of Ockham's Summa Logicae brought forward one of the first serious proposals for codifying a mental language.

The scholastics of the high medieval period, such as Ockham and John Duns Scotus, considered logic to be a scientia sermocinalis (science of language). The result of their studies was the elaboration of linguistic-philosophical notions whose complexity and subtlety has only recently come to be appreciated. Many of the most interesting problems of modern philosophy of language were anticipated by medieval thinkers. The phenomena of vagueness and ambiguity were analyzed intensely, and this led to an increasing interest in problems related to the use of syncategorematic words, such as and, or, not, if, and every. The study of categorematic words (or terms) and their properties was also developed greatly. One of the major developments of the scholastics in this area was the doctrine of the suppositio. The suppositio of a term is the interpretation that is given of it in a specific context. It can be proper or improper (as when it is used in metaphor, metonym, and other figures of speech). A proper suppositio, in turn, can be either formal or material according to whether it refers to its usual non-linguistic referent (as in "Charles is a man"), or to itself as a linguistic entity (as in "'Charles' has seven letters"). Such a classification scheme is the precursor of modern distinctions between use and mention, and between language and metalanguage.

There is a tradition called speculative grammar which existed from the 11th to the 13th century. Leading scholars included Martin of Dacia and Thomas of Erfurt (see Modistae).

=== Modern philosophy ===
Linguists of the Renaissance and Baroque periods such as Johannes Goropius Becanus, Athanasius Kircher and John Wilkins were infatuated with the idea of a philosophical language reversing the confusion of tongues, influenced by the gradual discovery of Chinese characters and Egyptian hieroglyphs (Hieroglyphica). This thought parallels the idea that there might be a universal language of music.

European scholarship began to absorb the Indian linguistic tradition only from the mid-18th century, pioneered by Jean François Pons and Henry Thomas Colebrooke (the editio princeps of Varadarāja, a 17th-century Sanskrit grammarian, dating to 1849).

In the early 19th century, the Danish philosopher Søren Kierkegaard insisted that language should play a larger role in Western philosophy. He argued that philosophy has not sufficiently focused on the role language plays in cognition and that future philosophy ought to proceed with a conscious focus on language:

If the claim of philosophers to be unbiased were all it pretends to be, it would also have to take account of language and its whole significance in relation to speculative philosophy ... Language is partly something originally given, partly that which develops freely. And just as the individual can never reach the point at which he becomes absolutely independent ... so too with language.

=== Contemporary philosophy ===
Language began to play a central role in Western philosophy in the early 20th century. The phrase "linguistic turn" describes the noteworthy emphasis that contemporary philosophers put upon language during this time.

One of the central figures involved in this development was the German philosopher Gottlob Frege, whose work on philosophical logic and the philosophy of language in the late 19th century influenced the work of 20th-century analytic philosophers Bertrand Russell and Ludwig Wittgenstein. In continental philosophy, the foundational work in the field was Ferdinand de Saussure's Cours de linguistique générale, published posthumously in 1916. The philosophy of language became so pervasive that for a time, in analytic philosophy circles, philosophy as a whole was understood to be a matter of philosophy of language.

Searching to disrupt the philosophy of language embroiled in these postmodernist and post-structuralist deadlocks, American academic Jason Ānanda Josephson Storm has introduced hylosemiotics. Influenced by theory including pragmatism in the mode of William James combined with insight into plant and animal communication, hylosemiotics seeks to establish a panspecies approach to signs, their intention, and meaning. In other words, hylosemiotics is a movement to strip the philosophy of language of its anthropocentrism.

== Major topics and subfields ==
=== Meaning ===
The topic that has received the most attention in the philosophy of language has been the nature of meaning, to explain what "meaning" is, and what we mean when we talk about meaning. Within this area, issues include: the nature of synonymy, the origins of meaning itself, our apprehension of meaning, and the nature of composition (the question of how meaningful units of language are composed of smaller meaningful parts, and how the meaning of the whole is derived from the meaning of its parts).

There have been several distinctive explanations of what a linguistic "meaning" is. Each has been associated with its own body of literature.

- The ideational theory of meaning, most commonly associated with the British empiricist John Locke, claims that meanings are mental representations provoked by signs. Although this view of meaning has been beset by a number of problems from the beginning (see the main article for details), interest in it has been renewed by some contemporary theorists under the guise of semantic internalism.
- The truth-conditional theory of meaning holds meaning to be the conditions under which an expression may be true or false. This tradition goes back at least to Frege and is associated with a rich body of modern work, spearheaded by philosophers like Alfred Tarski and Donald Davidson. (See also Wittgenstein's picture theory of language.)
- The use theory of meaning, most commonly associated with the later Wittgenstein, helped inaugurate the idea of "meaning as use", and a communitarian view of language. Wittgenstein was interested in the way in which the communities use language, and how far it can be taken. It is also associated with P. F. Strawson, John Searle, Robert Brandom, and others.
- The inferentialist theory of meaning, the view that the meaning of an expression is derived from the inferential relations that it has with other expressions. This view is thought to be descended from the use theory of meaning, and has been most notably defended by Wilfrid Sellars and Robert Brandom.
- The direct reference theory of meaning, the view that the meaning of a word or expression is what it points out in the world. While views of this kind have been widely criticized regarding the use of language in general, John Stuart Mill defended a form of this view, and Saul Kripke and Ruth Barcan Marcus have both defended the application of direct reference theory to proper names.
- The semantic externalist theory of meaning, according to which meaning is not a purely psychological phenomenon, because it is determined, at least in part, by features of one's environment. There are two broad subspecies of externalism: social and environmental. The first is most closely associated with Tyler Burge and the second with Hilary Putnam, Saul Kripke and others.
- The verificationist theory of meaning is generally associated with the early 20th century movement of logical positivism. The traditional formulation of such a theory is that the meaning of a sentence is its method of verification or falsification. In this form, the thesis was abandoned after the acceptance by most philosophers of the Duhem–Quine thesis of confirmation holism after the publication of Quine's "Two Dogmas of Empiricism". However, Michael Dummett has advocated a modified form of verificationism since the 1970s. In this version, the comprehension (and hence meaning) of a sentence consists in the hearer's ability to recognize the demonstration (mathematical, empirical or other) of the truth of the sentence.
- Pragmatic theories of meaning include any theory in which the meaning (or understanding) of a sentence is determined by the consequences of its application. Dummett attributes such a theory of meaning to Charles Sanders Peirce and other early 20th century American pragmatists.
- Psychological theories of meaning, which focus on the intentions of a speaker in determining the meaning of an utterance. One notable proponent of such a view was Paul Grice, whose views also account for non-linguistic meaning (i.e., meaning as conveyed by body language, meanings as consequences, etc.).

=== Reference ===
Investigations into how language interacts with the world are called theories of reference. Gottlob Frege was an advocate of a mediated reference theory. Frege divided the semantic content of every expression, including sentences, into two components: sense and reference. The sense of a sentence is the thought that it expresses. Such a thought is abstract, universal and objective. The sense of any sub-sentential expression consists in its contribution to the thought that its embedding sentence expresses. Senses determine reference and are also the modes of presentation of the objects to which expressions refer. Referents are the objects in the world that words pick out. The senses of sentences are thoughts, while their referents are truth values (true or false). The referents of sentences embedded in propositional attitude ascriptions and other opaque contexts are their usual senses.

Bertrand Russell, in his later writings and for reasons related to his theory of acquaintance in epistemology, held that the only directly referential expressions are what he called "logically proper names". Logically proper names are such terms as I, now, here and other indexicals. He viewed proper names of the sort described above as "abbreviated definite descriptions" (see Theory of descriptions). Hence Joseph R. Biden may be an abbreviation for "a past President of the United States and husband of Jill Biden". Definite descriptions are denoting phrases (see "On Denoting") which are analyzed by Russell into existentially quantified logical constructions. Such phrases denote in the sense that there is an object that satisfies the description. However, such objects are not to be considered meaningful on their own, but have meaning only in the proposition expressed by the sentences of which they are a part. Hence, they are not directly referential in the same way as logically proper names, for Russell.

On Frege's account, any referring expression has a sense as well as a referent. Such a "mediated reference" view has certain theoretical advantages over Mill's view. For example, co-referential names, such as Samuel Clemens and Mark Twain, cause problems for a directly referential view because it is possible for someone to hear "Mark Twain is Samuel Clemens" and be surprised – thus, their cognitive content seems different.

Despite the differences between the views of Frege and Russell, they are generally lumped together as descriptivists about proper names. Such descriptivism was criticized in Saul Kripke's Naming and Necessity.

Kripke put forth what has come to be known as "the modal argument" (or "argument from rigidity"). Consider the name Aristotle and the descriptions "the greatest student of Plato", "the founder of logic" and "the teacher of Alexander". Aristotle obviously satisfies all of the descriptions (and many of the others we commonly associate with him), but it is not necessarily true that if Aristotle existed then Aristotle was any one, or all, of these descriptions. Aristotle may well have existed without doing any single one of the things for which he is known to posterity. He may have existed and not have become known to posterity at all or he may have died in infancy. Suppose that Aristotle is associated by Mary with the description "the last great philosopher of antiquity" and (the actual) Aristotle died in infancy. Then Mary's description would seem to refer to Plato. But this is deeply counterintuitive. Hence, names are rigid designators, according to Kripke. That is, they refer to the same individual in every possible world in which that individual exists. In the same work, Kripke articulated several other arguments against "Frege–Russell" descriptivism (see also Kripke's causal theory of reference).

The whole philosophical enterprise of studying reference has been critiqued by linguist Noam Chomsky in various works.

=== Composition and parts ===
It has long been known that there are different parts of speech. One part of the common sentence is the lexical word, which is composed of nouns, verbs, and adjectives. A major question in the field – perhaps the single most important question for formalist and structuralist thinkers – is how the meaning of a sentence emerges from its parts.

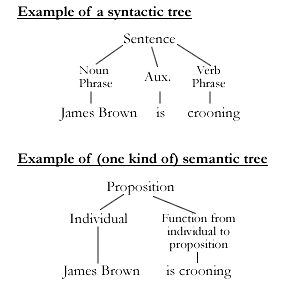
Example of a syntactic tree

Many aspects of the problem of the composition of sentences are addressed in the field of linguistics of syntax. Philosophical semantics tends to focus on the principle of compositionality to explain the relationship between meaningful parts and whole sentences. The principle of compositionality asserts that a sentence can be understood on the basis of the meaning of the parts of the sentence (i.e., words, morphemes) along with an understanding of its structure (i.e., syntax, logic). Further, syntactic propositions are arranged into discourse or narrative structures, which also encode meanings through pragmatics like temporal relations and pronominals.

It is possible to use the concept of functions to describe more than just how lexical meanings work: they can also be used to describe the meaning of a sentence. In the sentence "The horse is red", "the horse" can be considered to be the product of a propositional function. A propositional function is an operation of language that takes an entity (in this case, the horse) as an input and outputs a semantic fact (i.e., the proposition that is represented by "The horse is red"). In other words, a propositional function is like an algorithm. The meaning of "red" in this case is whatever takes the entity "the horse" and turns it into the statement, "The horse is red."

Linguists have developed at least two general methods of understanding the relationship between the parts of a linguistic string and how it is put together: syntactic and semantic trees. Syntactic trees draw upon the words of a sentence with the grammar of the sentence in mind; semantic trees focus upon the role of the meaning of the words and how those meanings combine to provide insight onto the genesis of semantic facts.

=== Mind and language ===
==== Innateness and learning ====
Some of the major issues at the intersection of philosophy of language and philosophy of mind are also dealt with in modern psycholinguistics. Some important questions regard the amount of innate language, if language acquisition is a special faculty in the mind, and what the connection is between thought and language.

There are three general perspectives on the issue of language learning. The first is the behaviorist perspective, which dictates that not only is the solid bulk of language learned, but it is learned via conditioning. The second is the hypothesis testing perspective, which understands the child's learning of syntactic rules and meanings to involve the postulation and testing of hypotheses, through the use of the general faculty of intelligence. The final candidate for explanation is the innatist perspective, which states that at least some of the syntactic settings are innate and hardwired, based on certain modules of the mind.

There are varying notions of the structure of the brain when it comes to language. Connectionist models emphasize the idea that a person's lexicon and their thoughts operate in a kind of distributed, associative network. Nativist models assert that there are specialized devices in the brain that are dedicated to language acquisition. Computation models emphasize the notion of a representational language of thought and the logic-like, computational processing that the mind performs over them. Emergentist models focus on the notion that natural faculties are a complex system that emerge from simpler biological parts. Reductionist models attempt to explain higher-level mental processes in terms of the basic low-level neurophysiological activity.

=== Communication ===
Firstly, this field of study seeks to better understand what speakers and listeners do with language in communication, and how it is used socially. Specific interests include the topics of language learning, language creation, and speech acts.

Secondly, the question of how language relates to the minds of both the speaker and the interpreter is investigated. Of specific interest is the grounds for successful translation of words and concepts into their equivalents in another language.

==== Language and thought ====
An important problem which touches both philosophy of language and philosophy of mind is to what extent language influences thought and vice versa. There have been a number of different perspectives on this issue, each offering a number of insights and suggestions.

Linguists Sapir and Whorf suggested that language limited the extent to which members of a "linguistic community" can think about certain subjects (a hypothesis paralleled in George Orwell's novel Nineteen Eighty-Four). In other words, language was analytically prior to thought. Philosopher Michael Dummett is also a proponent of the "language-first" viewpoint.

The stark opposite to the Sapir–Whorf position is the notion that thought (or, more broadly, mental content) has priority over language. The "knowledge-first" position can be found, for instance, in the work of Paul Grice. Further, this view is closely associated with Jerry Fodor and his language of thought hypothesis. According to his argument, spoken and written language derive their intentionality and meaning from an internal language encoded in the mind. The main argument in favor of such a view is that the structure of thoughts and the structure of language seem to share a compositional, systematic character. Another argument is that it is difficult to explain how signs and symbols on paper can represent anything meaningful unless some sort of meaning is infused into them by the contents of the mind. One of the main arguments against is that such levels of language can lead to an infinite regress. In any case, many philosophers of mind and language, such as Ruth Millikan, Fred Dretske and Fodor, have recently turned their attention to explaining the meanings of mental contents and states directly.

Another tradition of philosophers has attempted to show that language and thought are coextensive – that there is no way of explaining one without the other. Donald Davidson, in his essay "Thought and Talk", argued that the notion of belief could only arise as a product of public linguistic interaction. Daniel Dennett holds a similar interpretationist view of propositional attitudes. To an extent, the theoretical underpinnings to cognitive semantics (including the notion of semantic framing) suggest the influence of language upon thought. However, the same tradition views meaning and grammar as a function of conceptualization, making it difficult to assess in any straightforward way.

Some thinkers, like the ancient sophist Gorgias, have questioned whether or not language was capable of capturing thought at all.

...speech can never exactly represent perceptibles, since it is different from them, and perceptibles are apprehended each by the one kind of organ, speech by another. Hence, since the objects of sight cannot be presented to any other organ but sight, and the different sense-organs cannot give their information to one another, similarly speech cannot give any information about perceptibles. Therefore, if anything exists and is comprehended, it is incommunicable.

There are studies that prove that languages shape how people understand causality. Some of them were performed by Lera Boroditsky. For example, English speakers tend to say things like "John broke the vase" even for accidents. However, Spanish or Japanese speakers would be more likely to say "the vase broke itself". In studies conducted by Caitlin Fausey at Stanford University speakers of English, Spanish and Japanese watched videos of two people popping balloons, breaking eggs and spilling drinks either intentionally or accidentally. Later everyone was asked whether they could remember who did what. Spanish and Japanese speakers did not remember the agents of accidental events as well as did English speakers.

Russian speakers, who make an extra distinction between light and dark blue in their language, are better able to visually discriminate shades of blue. The Piraha, a tribe in Brazil, whose language has only terms like few and many instead of numerals, are not able to keep track of exact quantities.

In one study German and Spanish speakers were asked to describe objects having opposite gender assignment in those two languages. The descriptions they gave differed in a way predicted by grammatical gender. For example, when asked to describe a "key"—a word that is masculine in German and feminine in Spanish—the German speakers were more likely to use words like "hard", "heavy", "jagged", "metal", "serrated" and "useful" whereas Spanish speakers were more likely to say "golden", "intricate", "little", "lovely", "shiny" and "tiny". To describe a "bridge", which is feminine in German and masculine in Spanish, the German speakers said "beautiful", "elegant", "fragile", "peaceful", "pretty" and "slender", and the Spanish speakers said "big", "dangerous", "long", "strong", "sturdy" and "towering". This was the case even though all testing was done in English, a language without grammatical gender.

In a series of studies conducted by Gary Lupyan, people were asked to look at a series of images of imaginary aliens. Whether each alien was friendly or hostile was determined by certain subtle features but participants were not told what these were. They had to guess whether each alien was friendly or hostile, and after each response they were told if they were correct or not, helping them learn the subtle cues that distinguished friend from foe. A quarter of the participants were told in advance that the friendly aliens were called "leebish" and the hostile ones "grecious", while another quarter were told the opposite. For the rest, the aliens remained nameless. It was found that participants who were given names for the aliens learned to categorize the aliens far more quickly, reaching 80 per cent accuracy in less than half the time taken by those not told the names. By the end of the test, those told the names could correctly categorize 88 per cent of aliens, compared to just 80 per cent for the rest. It was concluded that naming objects helps us categorize and memorize them.

In another series of experiments, a group of people was asked to view furniture from an IKEA catalog. Half the time they were asked to label the object – whether it was a chair or lamp, for example – while the rest of the time they had to say whether or not they liked it. It was found that when asked to label items, people were later less likely to recall the specific details of products, such as whether a chair had arms or not. It was concluded that labeling objects helps our minds build a prototype of the typical object in the group at the expense of individual features.

=== Social interaction and language ===
A common claim is that language is governed by social conventions. Questions inevitably arise on surrounding topics. One question regards what a convention exactly is, and how it is studied, and second regards the extent that conventions even matter in the study of language. David Kellogg Lewis proposed a worthy reply to the first question by expounding the view that a convention is a "rationally self-perpetuating regularity in behavior". However, this view seems to compete to some extent with the Gricean view of speaker's meaning, requiring either one (or both) to be weakened if both are to be taken as true.

Some have questioned whether or not conventions are relevant to the study of meaning at all. Noam Chomsky proposed that the study of language could be done in terms of the I-Language, or internal language of persons. If this is so, then it undermines the pursuit of explanations in terms of conventions, and relegates such explanations to the domain of metasemantics. Metasemantics is a term used by philosopher of language Robert Stainton to describe all those fields that attempt to explain how semantic facts arise. One fruitful source of research involves investigation into the social conditions that give rise to, or are associated with, meanings and languages. Etymology (the study of the origins of words) and stylistics (philosophical argumentation over what makes "good grammar", relative to a particular language) are two other examples of fields that are taken to be metasemantic.

Many separate (but related) fields have investigated the topic of linguistic convention within their own research paradigms. The presumptions that prop up each theoretical view are of interest to the philosopher of language. For instance, one of the major fields of sociology, symbolic interactionism, is based on the insight that human social organization is based almost entirely on the use of meanings. In consequence, any explanation of a social structure (like an institution) would need to account for the shared meanings which create and sustain the structure.

Rhetoric is the study of the particular words that people use to achieve the proper emotional and rational effect in the listener, be it to persuade, provoke, endear, or teach. Some relevant applications of the field include the examination of propaganda and didacticism, the examination of the purposes of swearing and pejoratives (especially how it influences the behaviors of others, and defines relationships), or the effects of gendered language. It can also be used to study linguistic transparency (or speaking in an accessible manner), as well as performative utterances and the various tasks that language can perform (called "speech acts"). It also has applications to the study and interpretation of law, and helps give insight to the logical concept of the domain of discourse.

Literary theory is a discipline that some literary theorists claim overlaps with the philosophy of language. It emphasizes the methods that readers and critics use in understanding a text. This field, an outgrowth of the study of how to properly interpret messages, is closely tied to the ancient discipline of hermeneutics.

=== Truth ===
Finally, philosophers of language investigate how language and meaning relate to truth and the reality being referred to. They tend to be less interested in which sentences are actually true, and more in what kinds of meanings can be true or false. A truth-oriented philosopher of language might wonder whether or not a meaningless sentence can be true or false, or whether or not sentences can express propositions about things that do not exist, rather than the way sentences are used.

== Problems in the philosophy of language ==
=== Problem of universals and composition ===
One debate that has captured the interest of many philosophers is the debate over the meaning of universals. It might be asked, for example, why when people say the word rocks, what it is that the word represents. Two different answers have emerged to this question. Some have said that the expression stands for some real, abstract universal out in the world called "rocks". Others have said that the word stands for some collection of particular, individual rocks that are associated with merely a nomenclature. The former position has been called philosophical realism, and the latter nominalism.

The issue here can be explicated in examination of the proposition "Socrates is a man".

From the realist's perspective, the connection between S and M is a connection between two abstract entities. There is an entity, "man", and an entity, "Socrates". These two things connect in some way or overlap.

From a nominalist's perspective, the connection between S and M is the connection between a particular entity (Socrates) and a vast collection of particular things (men). To say that Socrates is a man is to say that Socrates is a part of the class of "men". Another perspective is to consider "man" to be a property of the entity, "Socrates".

There is a third way, between nominalism and (extreme) realism, usually called "moderate realism" and attributed to Aristotle and Thomas Aquinas. Moderate realists hold that "man" refers to a real essence or form that is really present and identical in Socrates and all other men, but "man" does not exist as a separate and distinct entity. This is a realist position, because "man" is real, insofar as it really exists in all men; but it is a moderate realism, because "man" is not an entity separate from the men it informs.

=== Formal versus informal approaches ===
Another of the questions that has divided philosophers of language is the extent to which formal logic can be used as an effective tool in the analysis and understanding of natural languages. While most philosophers, including Gottlob Frege, Alfred Tarski and Rudolf Carnap, have been more or less skeptical about formalizing natural languages, many of them developed formal languages for use in the sciences or formalized parts of natural language for investigation. Some of the most prominent members of this tradition of formal semantics include Tarski, Carnap, Richard Montague and Donald Davidson.

On the other side of the divide, and especially prominent in the 1950s and '60s, were the so-called "ordinary language philosophers". Philosophers such as P. F. Strawson, John Langshaw Austin and Gilbert Ryle stressed the importance of studying natural language without regard to the truth-conditions of sentences and the references of terms. They did not believe that the social and practical dimensions of linguistic meaning could be captured by any attempts at formalization using the tools of logic. Logic is one thing and language is something entirely different. What is important is not expressions themselves but what people use them to do in communication.

Hence, Austin developed a theory of speech acts, which described the kinds of things which can be done with a sentence (assertion, command, inquiry, exclamation) in different contexts of use on different occasions. Strawson argued that the truth-table semantics of the logical connectives (e.g., $\land$, $\lor$ and $\rightarrow$) do not capture the meanings of their natural language counterparts ("and", "or" and "if-then"). While the "ordinary language" movement basically died out in the 1970s, its influence was crucial to the development of the fields of speech-act theory and the study of pragmatics. Many of its ideas have been absorbed by theorists such as Kent Bach, Robert Brandom, Paul Horwich and Stephen Neale. In recent work, the division between semantics and pragmatics has become a lively topic of discussion at the interface of philosophy and linguistics, for instance in work by Sperber and Wilson, Carston and Levinson.

While keeping these traditions in mind, the question of whether or not there is any grounds for conflict between the formal and informal approaches is far from being decided. Some theorists, like Paul Grice, have been skeptical of any claims that there is a substantial conflict between logic and natural language.

=== Game theoretical approach ===
Game theory has been suggested as a tool to study the evolution of language. Some researchers that have developed game theoretical approaches to philosophy of language are David K. Lewis, Schuhmacher, and Rubinstein.

=== Translation and interpretation ===
Translation and interpretation are two other problems that philosophers of language have attempted to confront. In the 1950s, W.V. Quine argued for the indeterminacy of meaning and reference based on the principle of radical translation. In Word and Object, Quine asks readers to imagine a situation in which they are confronted with a previously undocumented, group of indigenous people where they must attempt to make sense of the utterances and gestures that its members make. This is the situation of radical translation.

He claimed that, in such a situation, it is impossible in principle to be absolutely certain of the meaning or reference that a speaker of the indigenous peoples language attaches to an utterance. For example, if a speaker sees a rabbit and says "gavagai", is she referring to the whole rabbit, to the rabbit's tail, or to a temporal part of the rabbit? All that can be done is to examine the utterance as a part of the overall linguistic behaviour of the individual, and then use these observations to interpret the meaning of all other utterances. From this basis, one can form a manual of translation. But, since reference is indeterminate, there will be many such manuals, no one of which is more correct than the others. For Quine, as for Wittgenstein and Austin, meaning is not something that is associated with a single word or sentence, but is rather something that, if it can be attributed at all, can only be attributed to a whole language. The resulting view is called semantic holism.

Inspired by Quine's discussion, Donald Davidson extended the idea of radical translation to the interpretation of utterances and behavior within a single linguistic community. He dubbed this notion radical interpretation. He suggested that the meaning that any individual ascribed to a sentence could only be determined by attributing meanings to many, perhaps all, of the individual's assertions, as well as their mental states and attitudes.

=== Vagueness ===
One issue that has troubled philosophers of language and logic is the problem of the vagueness of words. The specific instances of vagueness that most interest philosophers of language are those where the existence of "borderline cases" makes it seemingly impossible to say whether a predicate is true or false. Classic examples are "is tall" or "is bald", where it cannot be said that some borderline case (some given person) is tall or not-tall. In consequence, vagueness gives rise to the paradox of the heap. Many theorists have attempted to solve the paradox by way of n-valued logics, such as fuzzy logic, which have radically departed from classical two-valued logics.

== See also ==
- Analytic philosophy
- Discourse
- Interpersonal communication
- Linguistics
- Semiotics
- Theory of language
