= Liber sex principiorum =

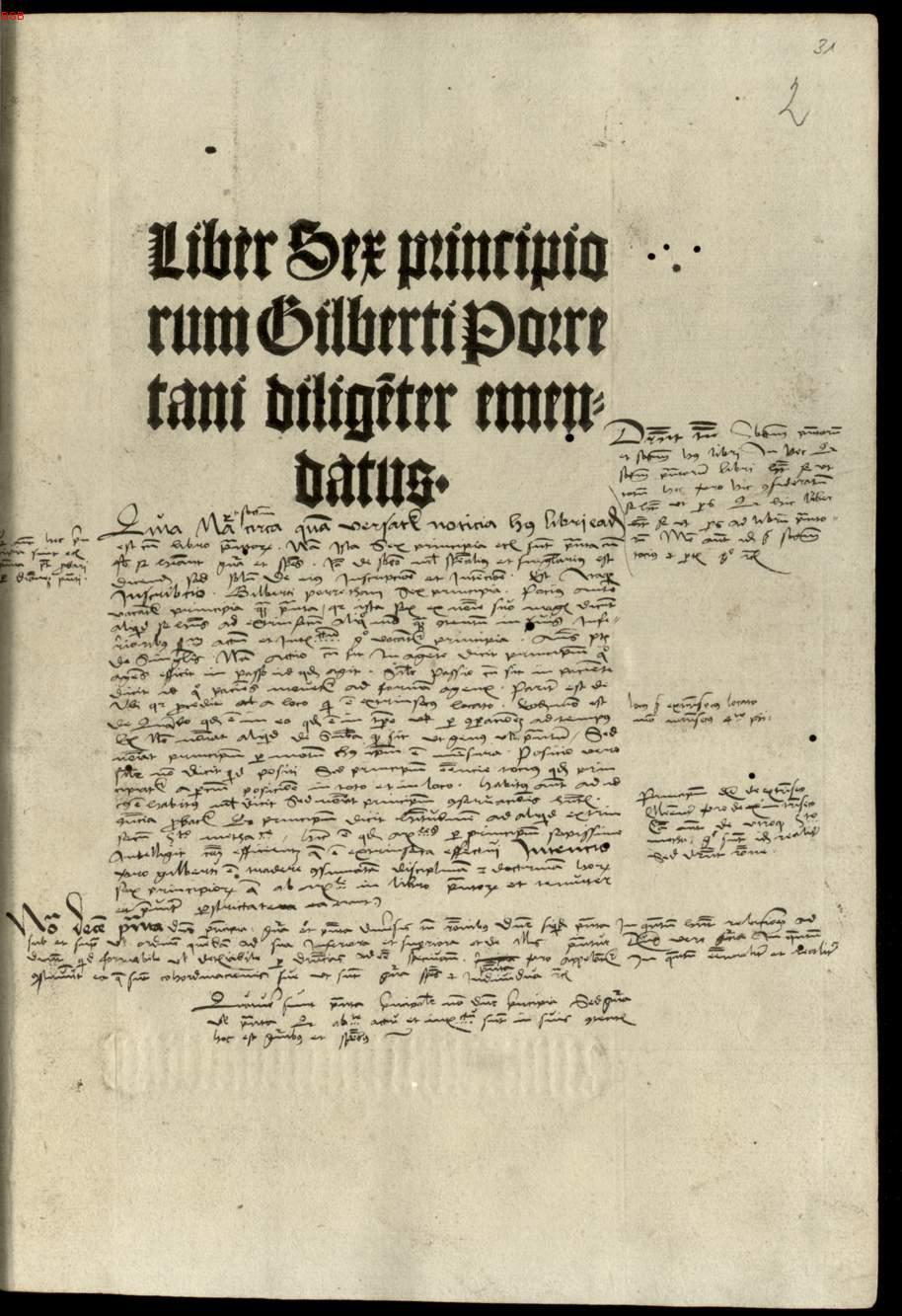
Heavily annotated titlepage of a copy of Arnold Wöstefeld's edition of the Liber sex principiorum printed by Konrad Kachelofen at Leipzig in 1509.

The Liber sex principiorum (or Liber de sex principiis) is an anonymous Latin work of philosophy from the late twelfth century. It aims to complement Aristotle's Categories by providing justifications for the six categories neglected by Aristotle in his scheme of ten categories. The "six principles" (categories) of the title are place, time, position, possession, action and passion (on top of substance, quality, quantity and relation). The Liber became one of the standard works of the logica vetus ('old logic') curriculum and by the mid-thirteenth century was erroneously ascribed to Gilbert de la Porrée. It was widely commented upon by medieval philosophers, including Robert Kilwardby, Nicholas of Paris, Martin of Dacia, Radulphus Brito, Peter of Auvergne and Thomas of Erfurt. Nevertheless, the complete text does not survive, only fragments.

There is a critical edition in Lorenzo Minio-Paluello, ed. (1966), Categoriarum supplementa: Pophyrii Isagoge translatio Boethii et Anonymi fragmentum vulgo vocatum 'Liber sex principiorum', Aristoteles Latinus, vol. I: 6–7, Desclée de Brouwer.

== Bibliography ==
- McMahon, William E. (1980). "The Liber sex principiorum, a Twelfth-Century Treatise in Descriptive Metaphysics". In E. F. K. Koerner (ed.). Progress in Linguistic Historiography: Papers from the International Conference on the History of the Language Sciences, Ottawa, 28–31 August 1978. Johns Benjamins Publishing Company. pp. 3–12. doi:10.1075/sihols.20.04mcm.
- Patar, Benoît (2006). Dictionnaire des philosophes médiévaux. Éditions Fides.
