= Dacia (Scandinavia) =

Medieval Latin name for Denmark

Dacia, a toponym historically associated with the Dacian Kingdom, largely in and around modern-day Romania, was for several centuries during the Middle Ages used to refer to Denmark in various documents and scholarly works. This misidentification arose from a combination of vague geographical knowledge, misinterpretations of ancient ethnonyms, and deliberate invention of origin stories. The name Dacia was first applied to Denmark by the 11th-century Norman historian Dudo of Saint-Quentin, who used false etymologies to relate the Danes (Dani), Dacians (Daci) and ancient Greeks (Danai) to each other in order to forge a prestigious origin legend for the Norman dukes. The term Dacia was adopted by other writers and subsequently also used by the papal administration and the Danish monarchy.

When the mendicant orders arrived in Scandinavia in the early 13th century, they chose Dacia as the name for their provinces. The Dominicans were the first to arrive in 1220, followed by the Franciscans in 1232. These provinces also encompassed Sweden and Norway, as well as parts of the Eastern Baltic. Consequently, the term Dacia could be used in narrow sense, referring to the Kingdom of Denmark, or in broad sense, referring to all three Scandinavian kingdoms. In medieval universities, the suffix de Dacia or the adjective Dacus was used to identify students and scholars from Denmark or Scandinavia.

Following the Protestant Reformation in the 16th century, the mendicant orders were dissolved in Scandinavia, and the name Dacia gradually fell out of use.

== Ancient Dacia and antique cartography ==
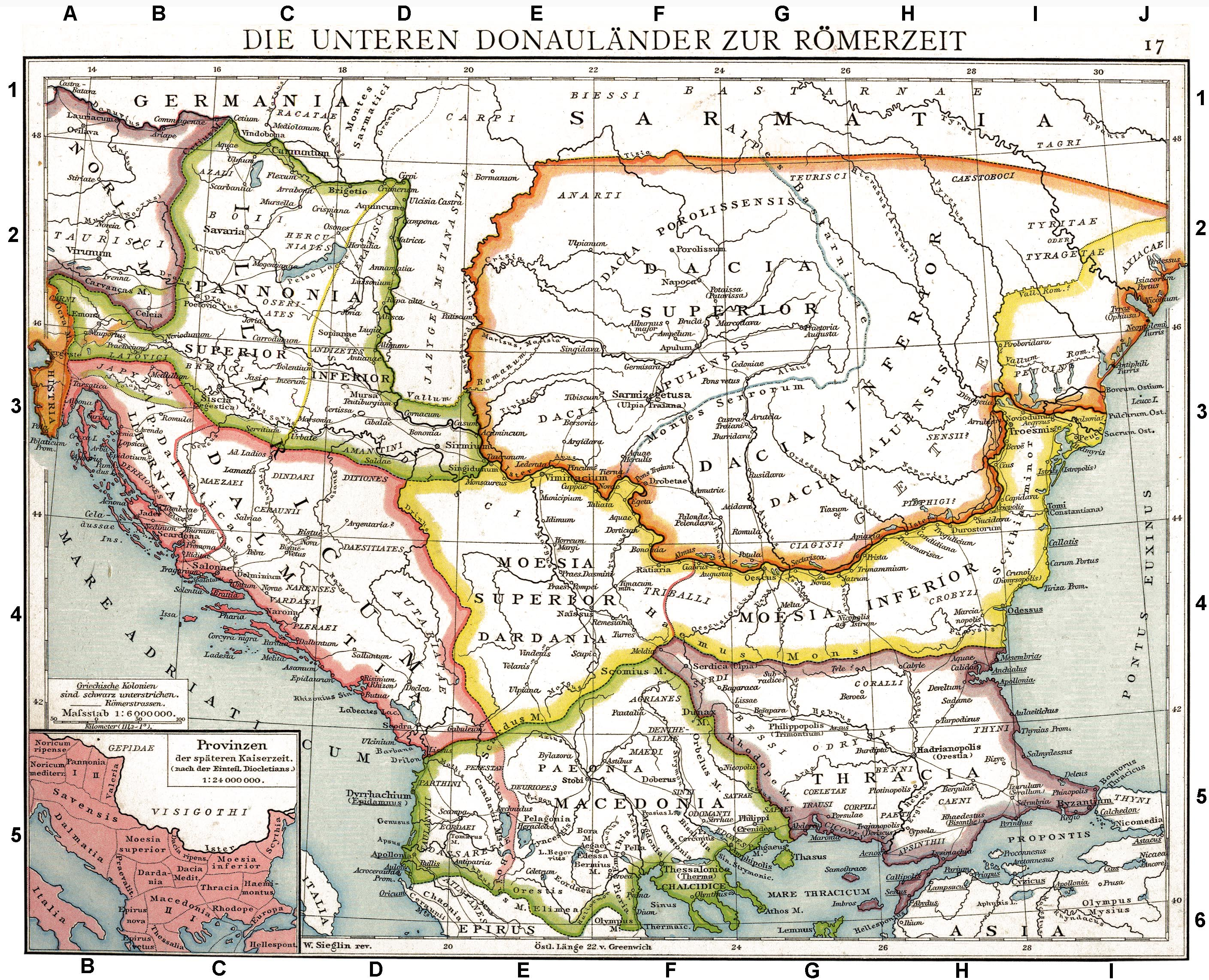
Map of Dacia and the other Roman provinces of the Lower Danube

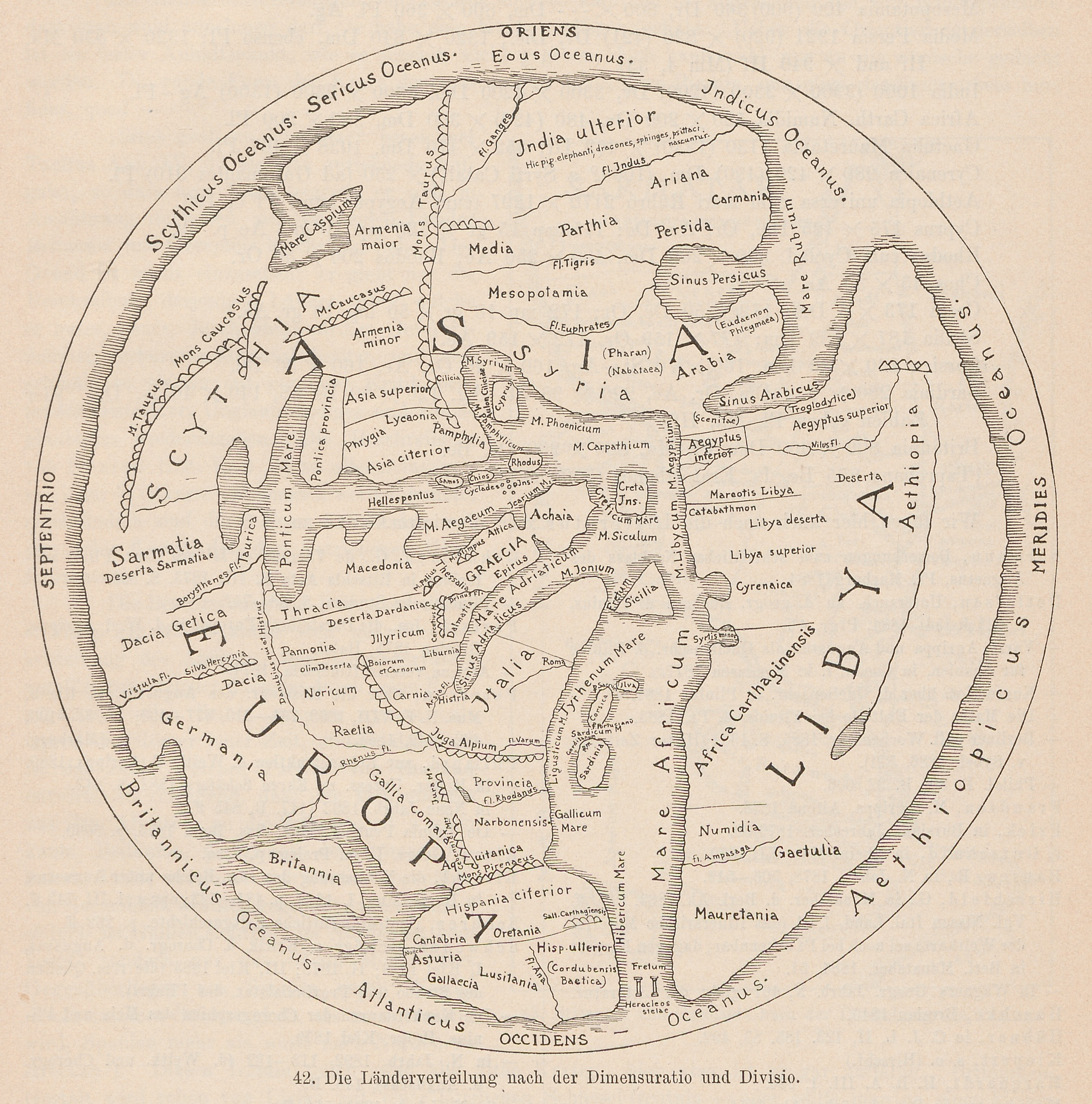
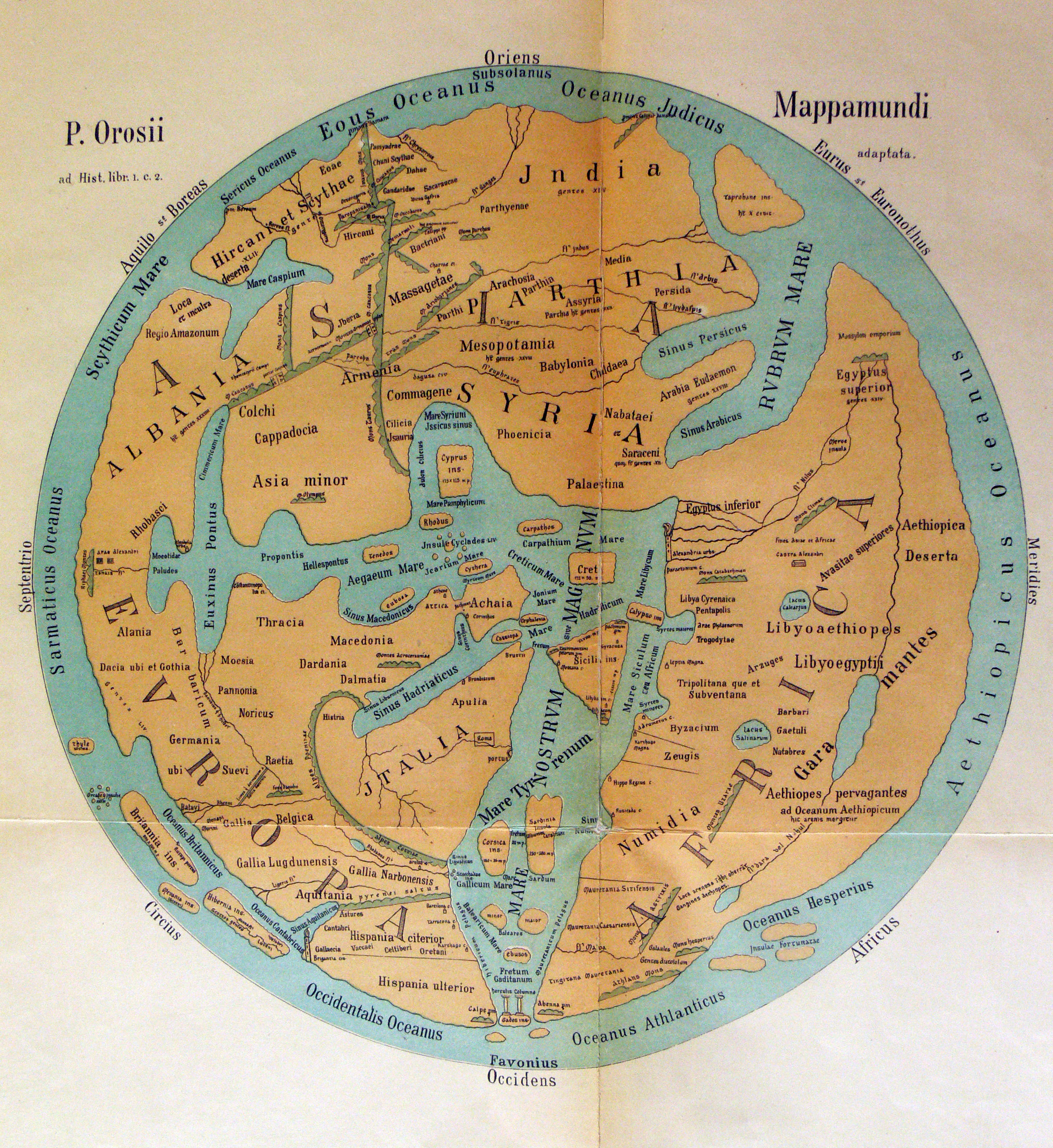
Konrad Miller's reconstruction of Dimensuratio's and Divisio's world map (left) and Orosius' world map (right). These reconstructions are not considered historically accurate, but they illustrate the vagueness of the antique knowledge of the Baltic region. North is to the left, and Dacia and Dacia Getica (Dimensuratio and Divisio) or Dacia ubi et Gothia (Orosius) are situated between the "Northern Ocean" and the Black Sea.

In classical antiquity, Dacia referred to the land north of the Danube River near the Black Sea, in what is now Romania. The Dacian Kingdom, which united the Getae and Dacian tribes, was founded in 82 BCE and lasted until it was conquered by the Roman Emperor Trajan in 106 CE. In the 3rd century CE, Germanic tribes like the Goths began migrating to the area, weakening Roman control. The Romans eventually abandoned the province in the 270s.

Early Roman geographical knowledge extended only as far north as the Black Sea. Information about the Baltic region and Scandinavia was extremely limited. This is evident in the two geographical texts Dimensuratio provinciarum and Divisio orbis terrarum. In Konrad Miller's 19th-century reconstruction of a world map based on these sources, Dacia is shown stretching from the Black Sea all the way to the "Northern Sea", but the Baltic region itself is left largely undefined.

Geographical understanding of the north improved during the Roman Empire's expansion under Augustus and Tiberius. However, Dimensuratio was later mistakenly attributed to the church father Jerome, leading Christian scholars to disregard more accurate Roman geographical accounts in favor of the older, less precise tradition. When the Spanish historian Paulus Orosius (c. 375/385 – c. 420) wrote his treatise Historiae Adversus Paganos ("History against pagans"), he relied on the Dimensuratio for his geographical presentation. He refers to "Dacia, where also Gothia lies" (Dacia ubi et Gothia), and places it between Alania and Germania.

A key difference between Orosius and earlier classical sources is that Orosius, writing during the Migration Period, describes Dacia as being inhabited not by the Thracian-speaking Getae, but by the Germanic Goths. Orosius' geography was repeated in the Etymologiae of Isidore of Seville (c. 560–636), one of the most important encyclopedic works of the early Middle Ages. Orosius' phrase Dacia media et Gothia is also repeated in De universo by Rabanus Maurus (d. 856). Meanwhile, the 6th-century Byzantine historian Jordanes equated the Goths with the Getae, attributing to them many traditions and records that had originally belonged to the Dacians and Getae. This conflation paved the way for later misidentifications.

== Norman historians ==
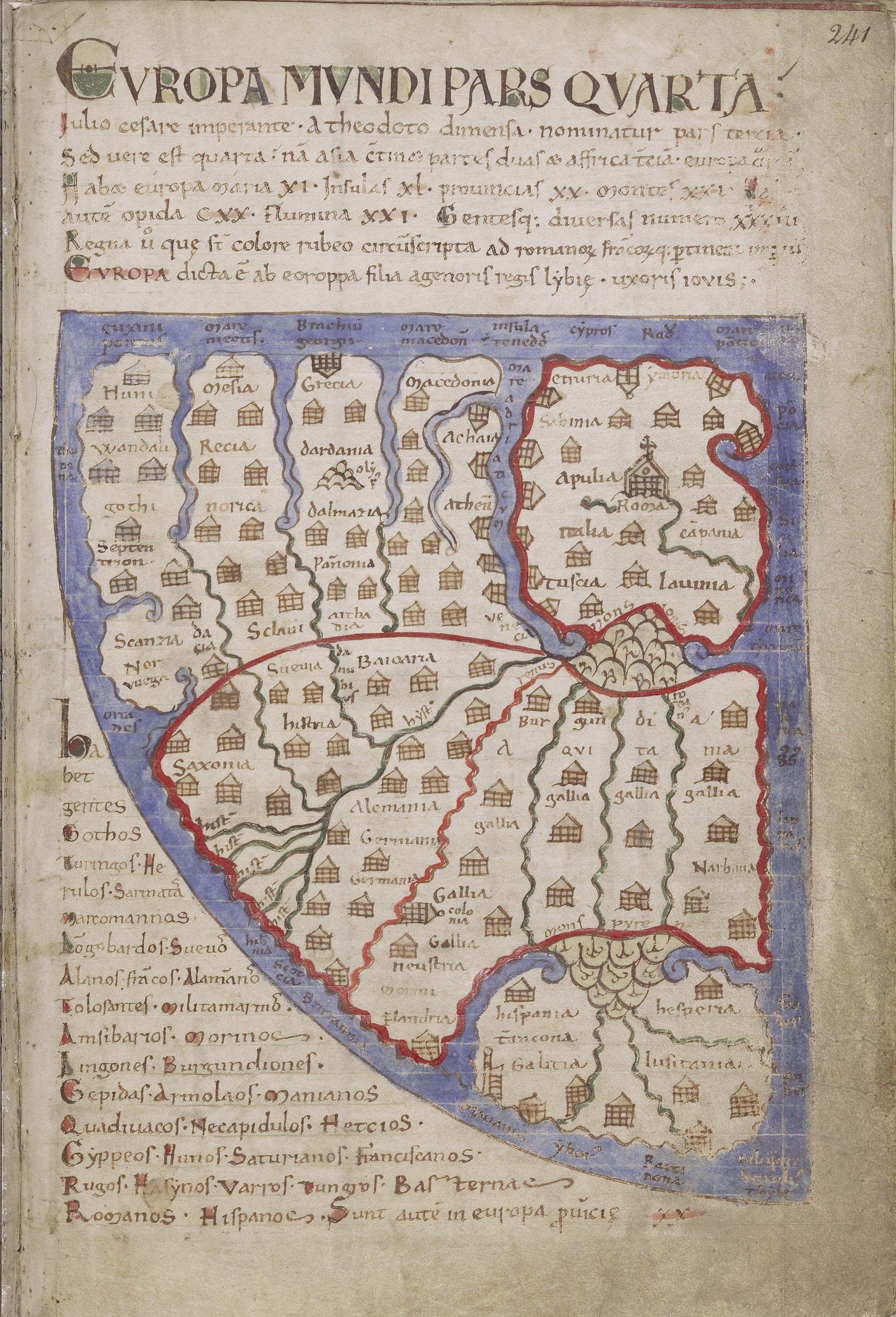
Map of Europe in Liber Floridus (1125). North is to the left. Dacia is located near the vaguely defined Scandinavian peninsula, next to Norvuega and Scandzia.

Explicit connection between Dacia and Denmark is established by the Norman historian Dudo of Saint-Quentin in his Moribus et actis primorum Normanniae ducum ("The Ways and Deeds of the First Norman Dukes"). Dudo's history of the Norman dukes was commissioned by Duke Richard I of Normandy, and his work can be seen as an effort to legitimize the dynasty by crafting them a prestigious origin.

Throughout his book, Dudo uses the terms Dani (Danish) and Daci (Dacian) interchangeably, and motivates this identification through a series of etymological and geographical connections. According to him, Rollo, the grandfather of his patron Richard I, originated from Denmark, from where he led a group of warriors to settle in Normandy. The Danes themselves are depicted as originating from Scandza (Scandinavia), a "northern island", which was considered to be the original Gothia, the homeland of the Goths. Following Jordanes, Dudo considers the Goths to be the same people as the Getae or the Daci. This conflation of peoples is also supported by Orosius' geography: since Dacia was adjacent to both Germania and Gothia (Scandinavia), it could only refer to the Jutland peninsula. Dudo further equated the Danes with the Danai, a poetic term for the Greeks, which allowed him to incorporate the mythical Trojan hero Antenor as the ancestor of Rollo.

William of Jumièges repeats and modifies Dudo’s origin story in his Gesta Normannorum Ducum. He refers to Dacia qua et Danamarca ("Dacia which is also Denmark"), and claims that the "Dacians are called Danes, from the name of their king Danaus". Written for William the Conqueror after 1066, the text also traces the origins of the Goths to the biblical figure Magog, using sources like Jerome and Isidore of Seville.

== German and Danish authors ==
German and Danish authors responded in different ways to the term. Danish historian Sven Aggesen explicitly uses the name Dacia in his royal chronicle Brevis historia regum Dacie (c. 1188). Saxo Grammaticus, in his Gesta Danorum (“Deeds of the Danes”), prefers the vernacular forms like Danorum, although he does acknowledge the term Dacia. He refers to Dacia quae et Dania ("Dacia, which is also Denmark"), a phrase that is also repeated in Historia scholastica by Honorius Augustodunensis. The 11th-century German historian Adam of Bremen discussed Denmark and Scandinavia, but did not use the term Dacia. In 15th–16th century, Sebastian Münster and Olaus Magnus both noted that the people of the North were once called Dacians, and that Denmark had in ancient times been called Dacia.

Sometimes the confusion between the Pontic Dacia and the Scandinavian Dacia had surprising consequences. In the Fornsvenska Legendariet, written by a Domican monk around the year 1300, it is claimed that the Roman emperor Trajan conquered the Baltic Denmark instead of the Pontic Dacia.

== Institutionalization by the Church ==
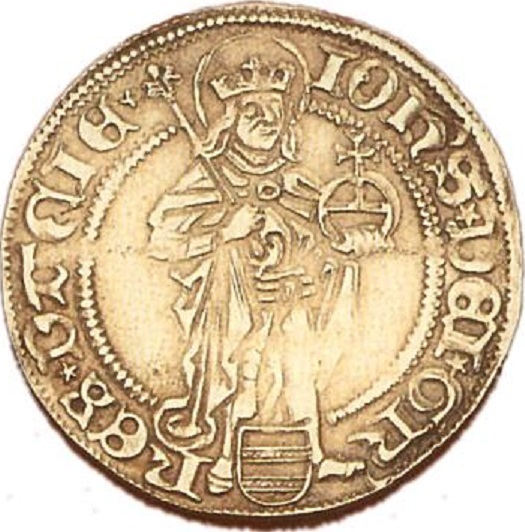
1497 coin of King John, who ruled Denmark, Norway and Sweden, with the legend IOHS DEI GR REX DACIE (Iohannes Dei Gratia Rex Dacie, "John, by the Grace of God, King of Dacia")

In 1104, a new archbishopric was created with its seat in Lund, encompassing the entire Scandinavian region. This ecclesiastical province was later subdivided when Norway gained its own archbishop of Nidaros (1152), and Sweden its own archbishop of Uppsala (1164). Despite this division, the Church continued to treat Scandinavia in many respects as a single province. The first known reference to Dacia in church administration dates to 1192, when Cardinal Cencius (later Pope Honorius III) referred to Denmark as Dacia in Liber Censuum, a register of papal income. After that, the term became standard in papal documents for referring to Denmark, and sometimes to all of Scandinavia.

When the Dominican, Franciscan, and Carmelite orders arrived in Scandinavia in the 13th and 14th centuries, they also used the name Dacia for their provinces. The first Dominicans (Blackfriars) arrived in 1220, followed by the Franciscans (Greyfriars) in 1232, and the Carmelites (Whitefriars) in 1410. Altogether, 96 mendicant convents were founded across Denmark (including Estonia and Schleswig), Norway, and Sweden (including Finland and Karelia). The Dominican province of Dacia included 31 male and 4 female convents, the Franciscans had 48 male and 4 female convents, and the Carmelites had 9 male convents. A province called provincia Daciae was also created by the Knights Hospitaller. The Augustinian Hermits also attempted to establish themselves in Scandinavia in the 14th century, but were unsuccessful.

== Reformation and the abandonment of the term ==
The end of Dacia as an official designation came with the Reformation. King Christian III broke from the Holy See and established Lutheranism as the state religion in Denmark and Norway. The mendicant orders which had helped institutionalize the name Dacia were dissolved in the 1520s and 1530s. The term Dacia disappeared from use in official contexts such as coinage and was replaced by Dania or other terms.

== Personal names ==
In medieval universities, personal names were often supplemented with place names to better identify individuals. At the University of Paris, the college established in the mid-13th century to house Scandinavian students was known as the Collegium Dacicum. The name suffix de Dacia or the adjective Dacus was used to indicate individuals from Scandinavia, particularly Denmark. Some notable examples include:

- Augustus de Dacia (d. 1285), prior of the Dominican province of Dacia
- Boetius of Dacia, 13th-century Danish philosopher
- Jacobus de Dacia (c. 1484 – 1566), Danish-born Franciscan friar, missionary to Mexico
- Johannes de Dacia, Danish 13th-century scholar, author of Summa Grammatica
- Martin of Dacia (c. 1240 – 1304), Danish scholar and theologian
- Nicolaus (Drukken) de Dacia, Danish scholar at the University in Paris around the years 1340–1345
- Petrus de Dacia (c. 1235 – 1289), friar of the Dominican Order and the first Swedish author whose works have been preserved
- Petrus Philomena de Dacia, 13th-century Danish mathematician and astronomer

== Place names ==
As part of the shift in terminology surrounding Denmark, place-names referring to Danes outside Scandinavia also underwent changes. In England, the Domesday Book of 1086 records a hundred in Hertfordshire as Daneis or Danais, reflecting earlier Danish settlement. This form persisted into the 12th century, but from 1196 onward, the name increasingly appeared as Dacorum, a Latinized form derived from Dacus, and fully replaced the older form by the mid-13th century.
