= Summa Grammatica (John of Dacia) =

The Summa Grammatica (Latin for Overview of Grammar; c. AD 1280) or Speculative Grammar (Grammatica Speculativa) was a work by the medieval Modist philosopher John of Dacia.

John calls grammar the "idiom of philosophers" and analyzes the modes using Aristotle's Metaphysics. He distinguished the vocal sign from the signifying value, called with the Latin expression ratio significandi.

== Developments in the Divisio scientiae ==
If the object of the Grammar is the signifying value of words and sentences, the above level is represented by the Logic whose object and purpose is the study of the ways of knowing:

- division, referred to the works of Boethius;
- definition which is partially covered by the Aristotle's Metaphysics chapter VII and Posterior Analytics chapter II;
- syllogistic inference, covered by the Aristotelian Organon.

The three types are not reciprocally exclusive, while they normally form a sequence of logical activities The abstract and literal form of the propositions can sometimes be applied to specific or singular proposition in order to deeply know the real world corresponding to the words thought. since its forst generation of Grammars m the modalist school established a biunivolcal relation between both of them.

== Works ==
- Diuisio scientie
- Summa grammatica
- Sophisma de gradibus formarum
  - All the works are printed in: Johannis Daci Opera, edited by Alfred Otto, Series: Corpus philosophorum Danicorum Medii Aevi voll. 1-2; Hauniae: G.E.C. Gad, 1955.

== Bibliography ==
- Murphy, James J. (1974), Rhetoric in the Middle Ages: A History of Rhetorical Theory from St. Augustine to the Renaissance, Berkeley: University of California Press, ISBN 0-520-04406-1.

== See also ==
- Summa Grammatica, the more famous work by Roger Bacon
- Grammatica Speculativa, the more famous work by Thomas of Erfurt
- Modistae, the philosophical school represented by the work
