= Ralph of Beauvais =

English grammarian and linguist

Ralph of Beauvais (Note: Latin: Radulfus Beluacensis, Radulphus Bellovacensis) (fl. 1142–1182) was an English grammarian and linguist.

Born in England, Ralph moved to France no later than 1140 to study under Peter Abelard, who died in 1142. Although he was largely forgotten by the end of the Middle Ages, he was famous in his own day. Gerald of Wales, referring to the late 1160s and 1170s when he was a student at Paris, writes that Ralph "far outdistanced all others in our days as the singular teaching authority on the art of literature and knowledge of grammar" (in artis litteratorie peritia grammaticaque doctrina singulari prerogativa nostris diebus ceteris cunctis longe preminebat). The chronicler Helinand of Froidmont, who was his pupil, calls him "erudite in divine as much as in secular letters" (in divinis quam in saecularibus litteris eruditus). His career was spent entirely as a teacher of grammar in the cathedral school of Beauvais. Sometime between 1182 and 1185, when he was an old man, he exchanged letters with Peter of Blois, reproaching Peter for having abandoned the schools to work for the archdiocese of Canterbury and being reproached by Peter in turn for having stuck to grammar when his peers had moved on to higher things. Among his students were Peter of Spain, Robert Blund and Robert of Paris.

Two works in Latin by Ralph are known. The Glose super Donatum (Note: also Summa super Donatum) is a commentary on the 4th-century Latin grammatical treatise Ars minora by Aelius Donatus. The Liber Tytan (Note: also Liber Titan) is a grammatical analysis of Latin poems, mainly selections from Ovid, Lucan and Virgil. Ralph's teaching is similar to that found in two anonymous treatises, the gloss on Priscian entitled Promisimus and the rudimentary Verba preceptiva. It was criticized in the 13th century by the speculative grammarian Michael of Marbais.
