= Radulphus Brito =

Radulphus Brito (c. 1270 – 1320) was an influential grammarian and philosopher, based in Paris. He is usually identified as Raoul le Breton, though this is disputed by some. Besides works of grammatical speculation he wrote on Aristotle, Boethius and Priscian.

Radulphus was Master of Arts in the University of Paris in 1296, and joined the theology faculty in 1311. Very few of his works are edited, although he was a prolific and influential writer. He was one of a group of grammarians called the Modistae or modists who flourished around Paris from about 1260 to 1310, so-called because they wrote on the mode of signifying.

== Works ==
- "Quaestiones in Aristotelis librum tertium De anima", edited by W. Fauser, in: Der Kommentar des Radulphus Brito zu Buch III De anima, Münster, Aschendorf 1974.
- Sophisma “Aliquis homo est species”, edited by Jan Pinborg in: “Radulphus Brito’s sophism on second intentions”, Vivarium, 13, 1975, pp. 119–152.
- Sophisma “Rationale est animal”, edited by Sten Ebbesen in: “The sophism Rationale est animal”, Cahiers de l’Institut du Moyen-Âge Grec et Latin 24, 1978, pp. 85–120.
- Sophisma “Omnis homo est omnis homo”, edited by Niels J. Green-Pedersen and Jan Pinborg, in: “Radulphus Brito: Commentary on Boethius’ De differentiis topicis and the sophism Omnis homo est omnis homo”, Cahiers de l’Institut du Moyen-Âge Grec et Latin, 26, 1978, pp. 1–92.
- “Quaestiones super De differentiis topicis Boethii”, edited by Niels J. Green-Pedersen and Jan Pinborg, in: “Radulphus Brito: commentary on Boethius’ De differentiis topicis and the sophism Omnis homo est omnis homo”, Cahiers de l’Institut du Moyen-Âge Grec et Latin, 26, 1980 pp. 1–92.
- “Quaestiones in Aristotelis libros De anima, q. 1.6” edited by Jan Pinborg, in: “Radulphus Brito on Universals”, Cahiers de l’Institut du Moyen-Âge Grec et Latin, 35, 1980, pp. 56–142.
- “Quaestiones super librum Porphyrii, qq. 5–8”, edited by Jan Pinborg, in: “ Radulphus Brito on Universals”, Cahiers de l’Institut du Moyen-Âge Grec et Latin, 35, 1980, pp. 56–142.
- “Quaestiones super Priscianum minorem”, edited by H.W. Enders and Jan Pinborg, ‘’Grammatica speculativa’’, vol. 3/1-2. Stuttgart-Bad Cannstatt:Frommann Holzboog, 1980.
- “Quaestiones super Sophisticos elenchos, qq. I.10-19” edited by Sten Ebbesen, in: “Texts on equivocation. Part II. Ca. 1250-1310”, Cahiers de l’Institut du Moyen-Âge Grec et Latin 68, 1998, pp. 99–307.
- “Quaestiones in Aristotelis libros ethicorum”, edited by Iacopo Costa, in: “Le questiones di Radulfo Brito sull’Etica Nicomachea” Introduction (in Italian) and critical text. Studia artistarum 16, Turnhout: Brepols, 2008.
- Quaestiones super Priora Analytica Aristotelis, edited by Gordon Wilson, Leuven: Leuven University Press, 2016.

== Bibliography ==
- William J. Courtenay, Radulphus Brito, master of arts and theology. Cahiers de l’Institut du Moyen-Âge Grec et Latin, 76, 2005, pp. 131–158.
- Jean-Luc Deuffic, "Un logicien renommé, proviseur de Sorbonne au XIVe siècle: Raoul le Breton de Ploudiry. Notes bio-bibliographiques", Pecia. Ressources en médiévistique, 1, 2002, pp. 145–154.
- Sten Ebbesen, "Radulphus Brito. The last of the great arts masters. Or: Philosophy and freedom", in: Jan A. Aertsen, Andreas Speer (eds.), Geistesleben im 13. Jahrhundert. Miscellanea mediaevalia 27. Berlin: Walter de Gruyter, 1999, pp. 231–251.
- A. M. Mora-Márquez, "Boethius of Dacia (1270s) and Radulphus Brito (1290s) on the Universal Sign ‘Every’", in Logica Universalis, 9, 2015, pp. 193-211. doi:10.1007/s11787-014-0112-6
- Benoît Patar, Dictionnaire des philosophes médiévaux, Québec: Fides, 2006, s.v. « Raoul le Breton ».
