= Peter Helias =

French medieval priest and philosopher

Peter Helias (Latin: Petrus Helias or Helyas; c. 1100 – after 1166) was a medieval priest and philosopher. Born in Poitiers, he became a pupil of Thierry of Chartres at Paris in the 1130s, also teaching grammar and rhetoric in his school. Around 1155 he returned to Poitiers where he later died.

Through Thierry, he is meant to have been influenced particularly by Boethius; other influences include William of Conches. He contributed to the theory of substance and influenced Roger Bacon's Overview of Grammar.

In linguistics, he is regarded as having contributed ideas key to the development of grammatical categories such as parts of speech.

== Works ==
- A commentary on Cicero's De inventione
- c. 1150: Summa super Priscianum, an updated textbook on Priscian's Institutiones grammaticae, edited by Leo A. Reilly, Toronto 1993
