= Basse Œuvre =

Coordinates: 49.43276°N 2.080822°E

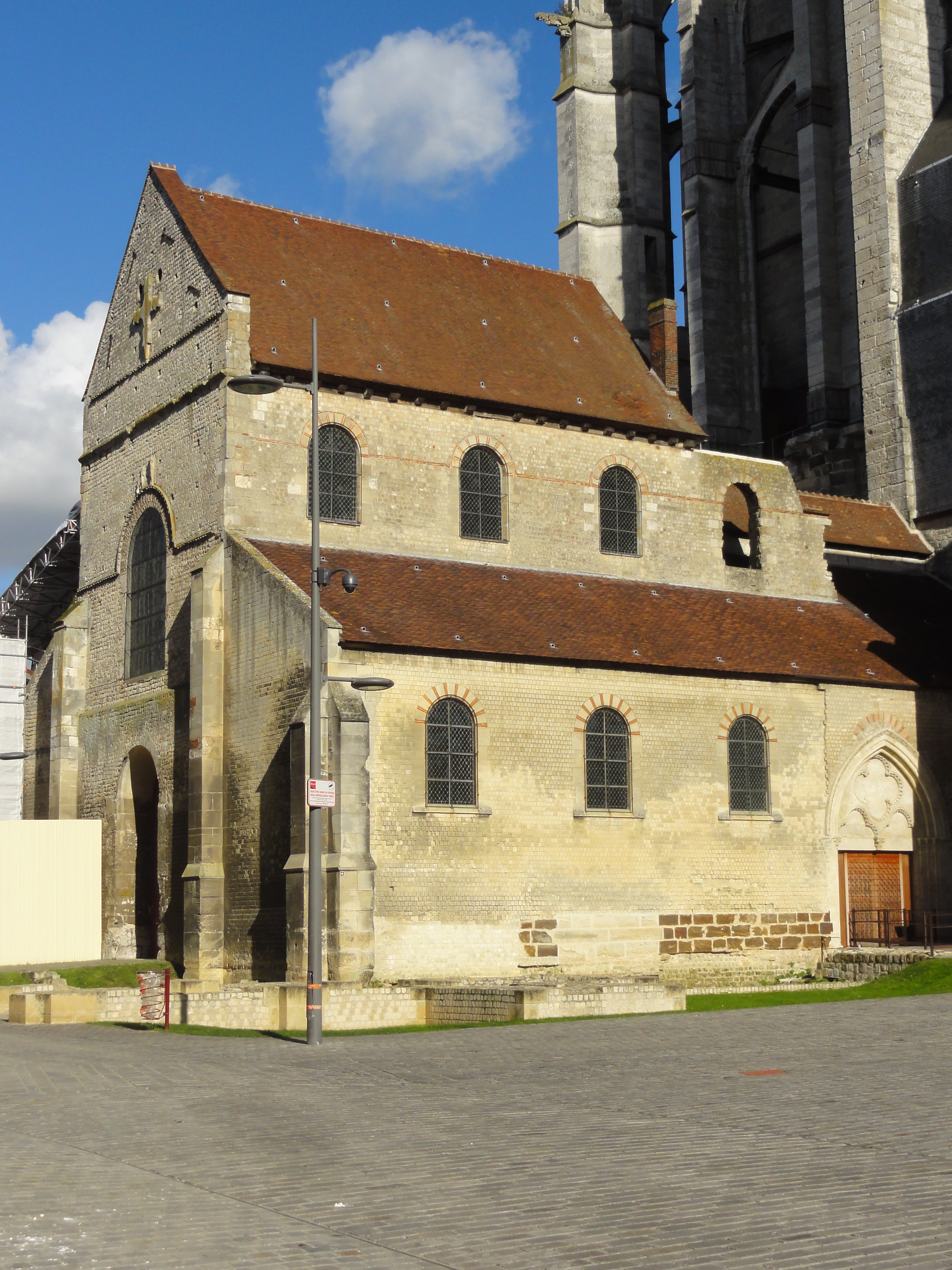
The church from the South

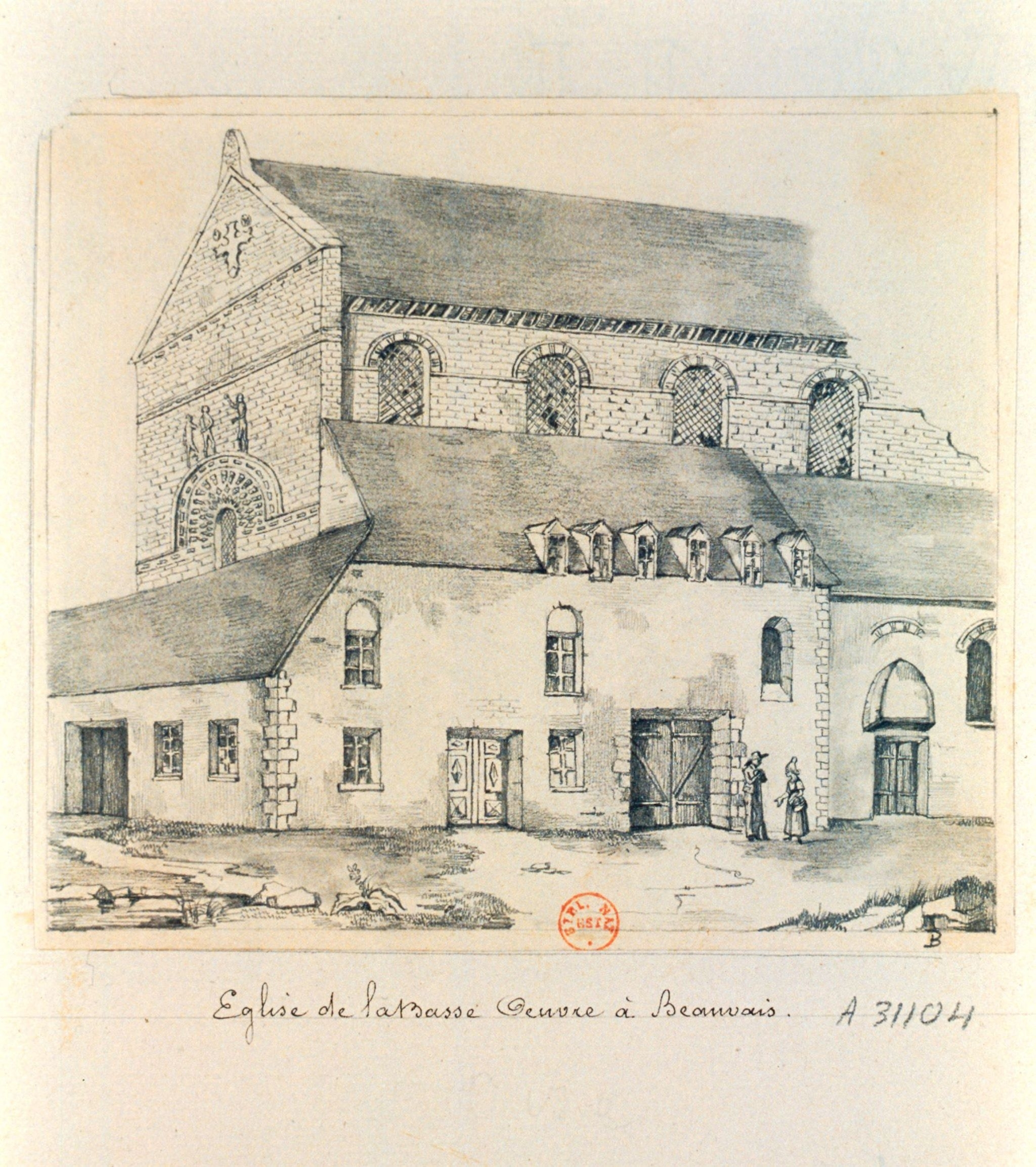
Engraving of the church in the 19th century

The Parish Church of Our Lady of the Basse Œuvre of Beauvais (French Église Notre-Dame-de-la-Basse-Œuvre de Beauvais) is a church at the west end of Beauvais Cathedral dating to the 10th century. It is the western end of a much longer church which had been Beauvais's cathedral, and was built in the form of a Roman basilica, a style which still characterized the Carolingian era.

The name Basse Œuvre ("Lower Work") dates from the 13th century, and distinguishes it from the Nouvel-Œuvre ("New Work"), the present 13th century Gothic cathedral.

It was classed as a historic monument in the list of 1840. The 21 archaeological digs of Émile Chami highlighted this monument.

== History ==
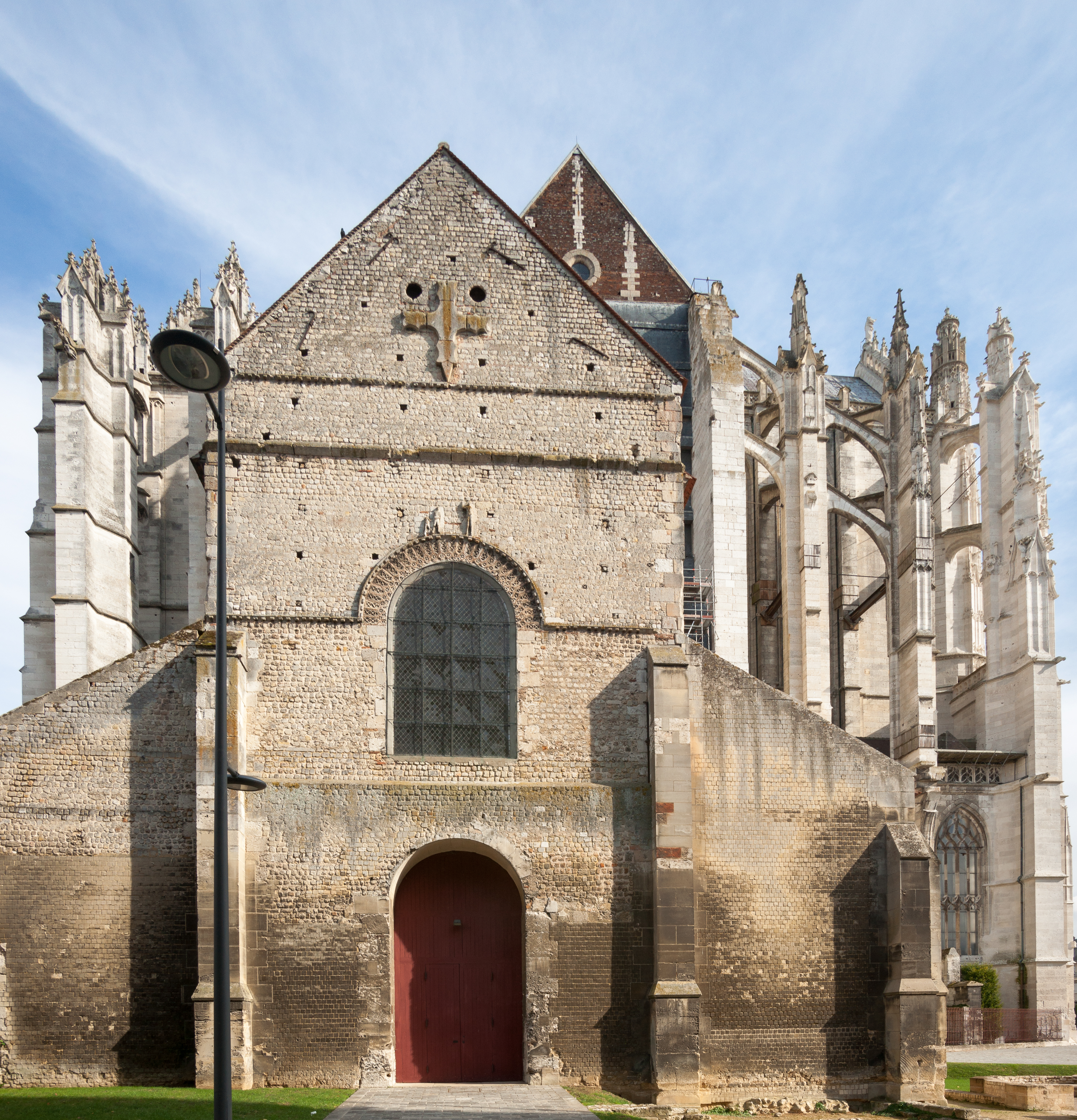
The church from the west with the buttress of the newer cathedral behind

The Basse Œuvre was built in the second half of the tenth century, and dedicated to St. Peter, the Virgin and St. John the Baptist.

Few sources allow an exact dating of the building. A text taken from an obituary in the cathedral dating from about 1635 indicate as master of works bishop Hervé, who died in 998 AD. However, Emile Shami, based on another anonymous manuscript source of the 17th century, suggested a date in the time of Bishop Hugh, predecessor of Hervé. Excavations and stratigraphic record support this second hypothesis.

Several fires over the centuries have ravaged the church, including two at the end of the eleventh century, one in the late twelfth century, and another in the early twelfth century. These fires caused premature aging of the monument. After the 1225 fire, the Basse Œuvre's east end was cut off for construction of the new cathedral's chancel, completed in 1272. In 1510, more of its east end was cut off during building of the Gothic transept of the new cathedral, destroying the remains of the old Carolingian transept and its nave's three eastern bays. Finally, in the 16th century and early 17th century, three more bays were sacrificed to make room for two buttresses that support the west side of the cathedral transept under architect Martin Chambiges.

In the 12th century, the cathedral school was famous under Ralph of Beauvais.

The building was restored in 1864 to 1867, but this restoration is often deemed too severe on the south side by art historians. The north side was free from restoration, and overlooks the cloister of the bishopric, whose west wing is dated to the eleventh century.

The small device in re-used stone came from the ancient Gallic ramparts of the city. The wall window keystones are alternately bricks and tiles.

Excavations showed a rebuilding of the facade of the Basse Œuvre and additions resulting from fires in the eleventh century.

== Bibliography ==
- Carol Heitz, France pré-romane, éd. Errance, 1987.
- Eugène Viollet-le-Duc, Dictionnaire raisonné de l'architecture française du XI^{e} au XVI^{e} siècle, 1856.
- E-J. Woillez, Archéologie des Monuments religieux de l'ancien Beauvoisis pendant la métamorphose romane, 1839.
- L'Art du Haut Moyen-Age dans le nord-ouest de la France, éd. Reineke-Verlag Greifswald, 1993.
- Histoire générale de l'art. L'art Médiéval, t. 2, A.V., éd. Librairie Aristide Quillet, 1938.
- Jean Hubert, Jean Porcher et W.F. Wolbach, L'Univers des formes. L'Empire carolingien, éd. Gallimard, 1968.
- Picardie gothique, réédition commentée d'extraits de La Bible de Pierre, de John Ruskin, traduction de Marcel Proust, éd. Casterman / Les Provinciales, A.V., 1995.
- San Bellet et Michel Marcq, Floraison gothique en Picardie, éd. du Quesne, 1992.
- La Cathédrale Saint Pierre de Beauvais (Oise). Itinéraire du Patrimoine, Numéro 139 [Guide touristique], éd. par l'Association pour la Généralisation de l'Inventaire Régional en Picardie (AGIR-Pic.), 1997.
- Dictionnaire des églises de France, Belgique, Luxembourg, Suisse (t.IV-D), éd. Robert Laffont.
- Gérard Denizeau (dir.), Histoire visuelle des Monuments de France, éd. Larousse, 2003.
- Anne Prache, Île-de-France romane, éd. Zodiaque, 1983.
- Philippe Araguas, Architecture religieuse gothique. Diversités régionales, éd. Rempart.
- Jean Favier (dir.), Dictionnaire de la France Médiévale, éd. Fayard, 1993.
- Martine Plouvier, La Cathédrale Saint-Pierre de Beauvais : architecture, mobilier et trésor
- Marie-Claude Vernat Chami, L'Art roman dans l'Oise et ses environs [Basse-Œuvre de Beauvais]
