= Dimensuratio provinciarum and Divisio orbis terrarum =

Latin geographical texts from late Roman period

Dimensuratio provinciarum ("Measuring of Provinces") and Divisio orbis terrarum ("Division of the World") are two Latin geographical texts of the late Roman Empire. They were edited, together with Agrippa's geographical Commentarii, by Paul Schnabel in 1935. Their image of the world was deeply based on Agrippa's Commentarii, and perhaps on his world map, which was inscribed in marble by Augustus and displayed in the Porticus Vipsania at Rome. The Dimensuratio, which was used by Alfred the Great in his geographic treatise, formed a link in the persistence of classical tradition, and even elements of Agrippa's Commentarii, in medieval geographies.

The Dimensuratio was subsequently lost, then rediscovered in the fifteenth century.
