= Modistae =

Speculative grammarians from the 13–14th centuries

The Modistae (Latin for Modists), also known as the speculative grammarians, were the members of a school of grammarian philosophy known as Modism or speculative grammar, active in northern France, Germany, England, and Denmark in the 13th and 14th centuries. Their influence was felt much less in the southern part of Europe, where the somewhat opposing tradition of the so-called "pedagogical grammar" never lost its preponderance.

== History ==
William of Conches, Peter Helias, and Ralph of Beauvais, also referred to as speculative grammarians, predate the Modist movement proper.

The Modist philosophy was first developed by Martin of Dacia (died 1304) and his colleagues in the mid-13th century, though it would rise to prominence only after its systematization by Thomas of Erfurt decades later, in his treatise De modis significandi seu grammatica speculativa, probably written in the first decade of the 14th century. Until the early twentieth-century this work was assumed to have been authored by John Duns Scotus. Widely reproduced and commented upon in the Middle Ages, it remains the most complete textbook of Modist speculative grammar. The mistaken authorship arose out of the natural affinity of Erfurt's speculative grammar with Scotus's metaphysics.

== Theory of modes ==
The philosophy of the Modistae, as indicated by their name, was based on a theory of 'modes' of meaning in language which was tripartite: modes of being (modi essendi), modes of understanding (modi intelligendi), and modes of signifying (modi significandi). To the Modistae, the various parts of speech were viewed as representing reality in terms of these modes. The modi essendi are objectively existent qualities in an object of understanding, the modi intelligendi the understanding's means of representing the modi essendi, and the modi significandi grammar's means of representing the modi intelligendi in language. This corresponds to Aristotle's tripartite semantic theory of words representing concepts which represent objects.

Opposing nominalism, they assumed that the analysis of the grammar of ordinary language was the key to metaphysics. For the Modistae, grammatical forms, the modi significandi of verbs, nouns, and adjectives, comprise the deep ontological structure of language, which objectively reflects reality. Their work predicted the concept of universal grammar, suggesting that universal grammatical rules may be extracted from all living languages. Roger Bacon may have given the movement inspiration with his observation that all languages are built upon a common grammar, a shared foundation of ontologically anchored linguistic structures. He argued grammar is substantially the same in all languages, even though it may undergo accidental variations between languages.

== Legacy ==
There are parallels between speculative grammar and phenomenology, a fact that was picked up early on by Martin Heidegger, who wrote his first book, Die Kategorien- und Bedeutungslehre des Duns Scotus (Duns Scotus's Doctrine of Categories and Meaning, 1916), on Thomas of Erfurt's treatise (at that time still mistakenly attributed to Duns Scotus).

== Modists ==
- Martin of Dacia, De modis significandi (after 1255)
- Boetius of Dacia, De modis significandi sive Quaestiones super Priscianum majorem (c. 1270)
- John of Dacia, Summa Grammatica (c. 1280)
- Simon of Dacia, Domus gramaticae (1255–1270)
- Radulphus Brito, Quaestiones super Priscianum minore (c. 1300)
- Michel de Marbais (d. c. 1300)
- Thomas of Erfurt, Tractatus de modis significandi seu grammatica speculativa (before 1310)
- Siger of Courtrai, Summa modorum significandi (1320).
- Johannes Josse de Marvilla, Expositiones modorum significandi

== See also ==
- Roger Bacon's Summa Grammatica
- Dante's De vulgari eloquentia
- Philosophical language

== Bibliography ==
=== Primary sources ===
- Radulphus Brito, Quaestiones super Priscianum minore, ed. by Jan Pingorg and K. W. Enders, Stuttgart-Bad Cannstatt: Frommann-Holzboog, 1980.
- Thomas of Erfurt, Grammatica speculativa, translated by G.L. Bursill-Hall, London: Longmans, 1972.
- Siger of Courtrai, Summa modorum significandi; Sophismata ed. by Jan Pinborg, Philadelphia: John Benjamins, 1977.
- Corpus Philosophorum Danicorum Medii Aevi:
  - I,1-2: Johannis Daci Opera, 1955
  - II: Martini de Dacia Opera, 1961
  - III: Simonis Daci Opera, 1963
  - IV: Boethii Daci Modi significandi, 1969.

=== Secondary sources ===
- Bursill-Hall, G. L. Speculative Grammars of the Middle Ages: The Doctrine of the partes orationis of the Modistae, Approaches to Semantics, 11, Mouton: The Hague, 1971.
- Fredborg, Karin Margareta. Universal Grammar According to Some 12th-Century Grammarians, in Studies in Medieval Linguistic Thought, ed. Konrad Koerner et al., Historiographia Linguistica, VII.1/2, John Benjamins, Amsterdam, 1980, 69-84.
- Fredborg, Karin Margareta. Speculative Grammar, in A History of Twelfth-Century Philosophy, ed. Peter Dronke, Cambridge: Cambridge University Press, 1988, 177-195.
- Kelly, Louis G. The Mirror of Gammar. Theology, Philosophy, and the Modistae, Philadelphia : J. Benjamins, 2002.
- Marmo, Costantino. A Pragmatic Approach to Language in Modism, in Sprachtheorien in Spätantike und Mittelalter, ed. Sten Ebbesen, Tübingen: Gunter Narr Verlag, 1995, 169-183.
- Pinborg, Jan. Speculative Grammar, in The Cambridge History of Later Medieval Philosophy, Norman Kretzmann, Anthony Kenny, and Jan Pinborg (eds.), Cambridge: Cambridge University Press, 1982, 254–69.
- Pinborg, Jan. Logik und Semantik im Mittelalter. Ein Uberblick, Stuttgart-Bad Cannstatt: Frommann-Holzboog, 1972.
- Pinborg, Jan. Radulphus Brito’s sophism on second intentions, Vivarium, 13, 1975, 119–152,
- Rosier, Irène. La grammaire spéculative des Modistes, Lille: Presses universitaires de Lille, 1983.
