= Thomas of Erfurt =

Thomas of Erfurt (fl. c. 1300) was a German philosopher, the most important of the so-called Modistae. He was probably a native of Erfurt. He had some connection to the University of Paris as a teacher or student. He later taught at St Severus' Church and the Schottenkirche in Erfurt.

Thomas wrote at least six works. His major work, Tractatus de modis significandi seu Grammatica speculativa, was often misattributed to John Duns Scotus until 1922. All the early manuscript evidence supports its attribution to Thomas. It was written before 1310. Attributed to Scotus, it was one of the subjects of Martin Heidegger's 1916 doctoral thesis. Charles Sanders Peirce borrowed the name of the first branch of his system of logic, "speculative grammar", from Thomas. The Grammatica speculativa has been published with English translation and commentary by Godfrey Bursill-Hall (Longman, 1972).

Thomas' other works include commentaries on Porphyry's Isagoge, Aristotle's Categories and On Interpretation, and the anonymous Liber sex principiorum. He also wrote a pedagogical poem on grammar, Commentarius in carmen ‘Fundamentum puerorum’.

== Bibliography ==
- Bellucci, Francesco (2018). Peirce's Speculative Grammar: Logic as Semiotics. Routledge.
- Beuchot, Mauricio [in Spanish] (2002). "Thomas of Erfurt". In J. J. E. Gracia; T. N. Noone (eds.). Companion to Philosophy in the Middle Ages. Blackwell Publishing. pp. 662–663.
- Zupko, Jack (2019). "Thomas of Erfurt". In E. N. Zalta (ed.). Stanford Encyclopedia of Philosophy.
