= Priscian =

6th-century Latin grammarian

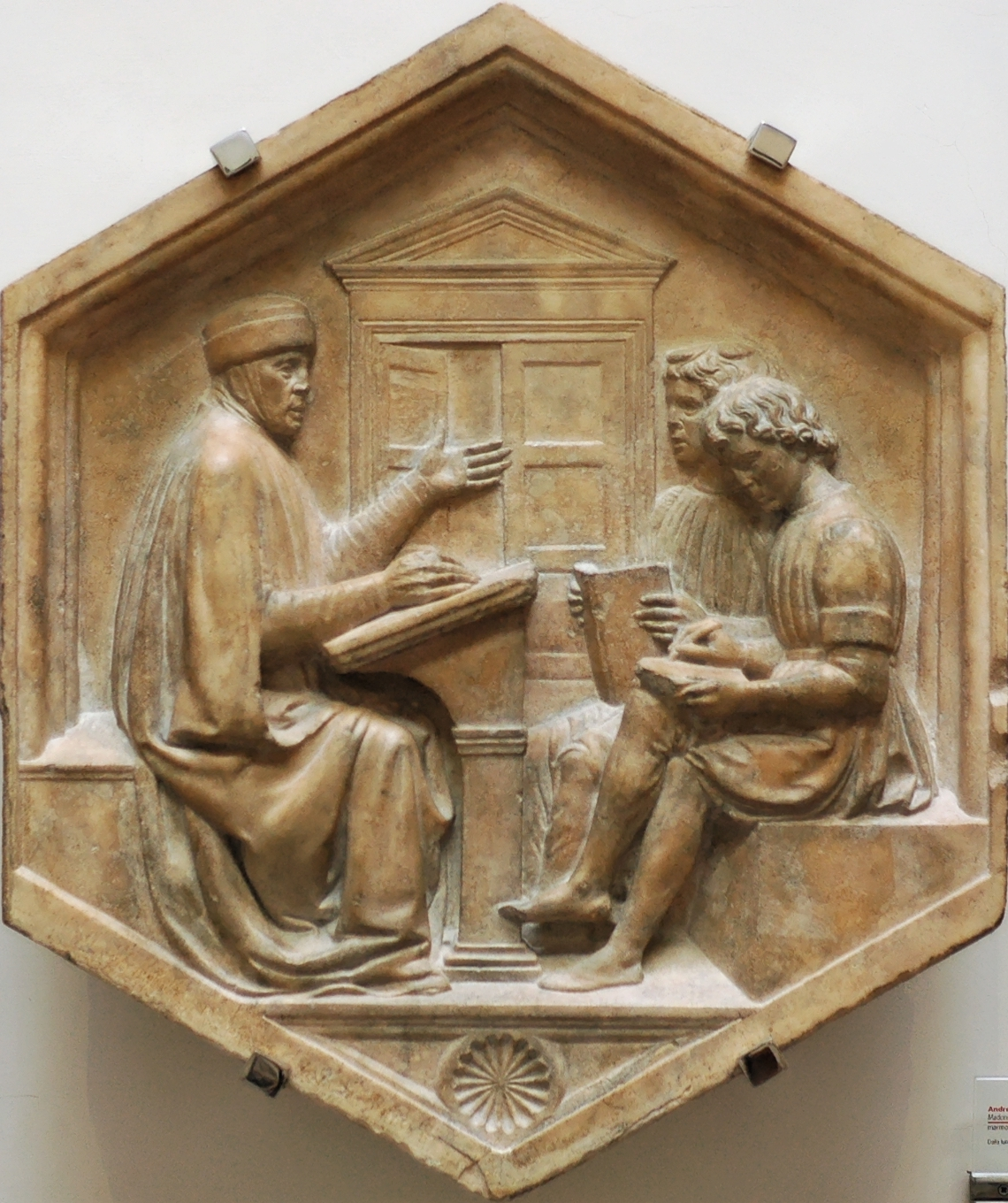
Priscian, or the Grammar, relief from the bell tower of Florence by Luca della Robbia

Priscianus Caesariensis (fl. AD 500), commonly known as Priscian (/ˈprɪʃən, ˈprɪʃiən/), was a Latin grammarian and the author of the Institutes of Grammar, which was the standard textbook for the study of Latin during the Middle Ages (along with the more elementary Ars Minor by Donatus and the reader Disticha Catonis). It also provided the raw material for the field of speculative grammar.

== Life ==
The details of Priscian's life are largely unknown. Priscian was born and raised in the North-African city of Caesarea (modern Cherchell, Algeria), the capital of the Roman province of Mauretania Caesariensis, which during his lifetime would be under the control of the Vandalic Kingdom. He was probably of Greek descent. According to Cassiodorus, he taught Latin at Constantinople in the early sixth century. His minor works include a panegyric to Anastasius (491—518), written about 512, which helps establish his time period. In addition, the manuscripts of his Institutes contain a subscription to the effect that the work was copied (526, 527) by Flavius Theodorus, a clerk in the imperial secretariat.

== Works ==
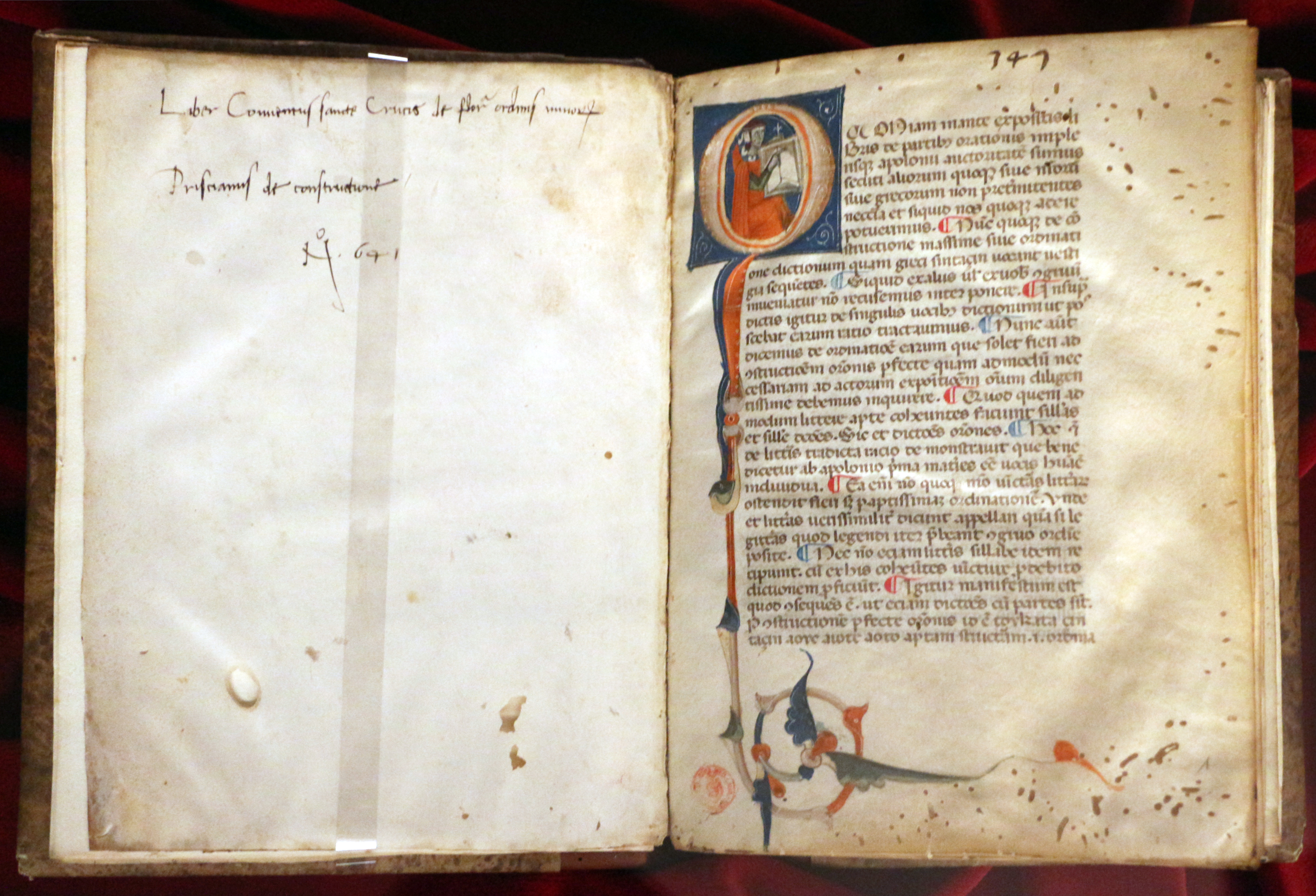
Institutiones Grammaticae, 1290 circa, Biblioteca Medicea Laurenziana, Florence

Priscian's most famous work, the Institutes of Grammar (Latin: Institutiones Grammaticae), is a systematic exposition of Latin grammar. The dedication to Julian probably indicates the consul and patrician, not the author of a well-known epitome of Justinian's Novellae, who lived somewhat later than Priscian. The grammar is divided into eighteen books, of which the first sixteen deal mainly with sounds, word-formation and inflexions; the last two, which form from a fourth to a third of the whole work, deal with syntax.

Priscian's grammar is based on the earlier works of Herodian and Apollonius. The examples it includes to illustrate the rules preserve numerous fragments from Latin authors which would otherwise have been lost, including Ennius, Pacuvius, Accius, Lucilius, Cato, Trajan, and Varro. But the authors whom he quotes most frequently are Virgil, and, next to him, Terence, Cicero, Plautus; then Lucan, Horace, Juvenal, Sallust, Statius, Ovid, Livy and Persius.

The grammar was quoted by several writers in Britain of the 8th century - Aldhelm, Bede, Alcuin - and was abridged or largely used in the next century by Hrabanus Maurus of Fulda and Servatus Lupus of Ferrières. About a thousand manuscripts exist, all ultimately derived from the copy made by Theodorus. Most copies contain only books I—XVI; these are sometimes known as the Priscianus Major ("Greater Priscian"). Others contain only books XVII and XVIII along with the three books to Symmachus; these are known as his work On Construction (De Constructione) or the Priscianus Minor ("Lesser Priscian"). A few copies contain both parts. The earliest manuscripts are from the 9th century, though a few fragments are somewhat earlier.

Priscian's minor works include:

- Three treatises dedicated to Symmachus (the father-in-law of Anicius Manlius Severinus Boethius): on weights and measures; on the metres of Terence; and the Praeexercitamina, a translation into Latin of Greek rhetorical exercises from Hermogenes.
- De nomine, pronomine, et verbo ("On noun, pronoun, and verb"), an abridgment of part of his Institutes for teaching grammar in schools
- Partitiones xii. versuum Aeneidos principalium: another teaching aid, using question and answer to dissect the first lines of each of the twelve books of the Aeneid. The metre is discussed first, each verse is scanned, and each word thoroughly and instructively examined.
- The poem on Anastasius mentioned above, in 312 hexameters with a short iambic introduction
- A translation in 1087 hexameters of the verse-form geographical survey by Dionysius Periegetes.

== Legacy ==
Books XVII and XVIII of the Institutes, his work On Construction, was part of the core curriculum of the University of Paris in the 13th century and Roger Bacon's lectures for the class were the probable origin of his own Overview of Grammar, one of the first expositions on the idea of a universal grammar.

Dante places Priscian in Hell among the sodomites in Canto XV of his Inferno. Dante's contemporaries knew of no historical evidence that Priscian was a sodomite. Giovanni Boccaccio suggested that Priscian was placed here to signify teachers of grammar in general, who were reputed to frequently sexually abuse their young students.

== Editions and translations ==
Editions

- Prisciani caesariensis grammatici opera ... Edited by Augustus Krehl. Lipsiae: Weidmann, 1819–20.
- Prisciani institutionum grammaticalium librorum I-XVI, indices et concordantiae. Curantibus Cirilo Garcia Roman, Marco A. Gutierrez Galindo. Hildesheim, New York: Olms-Weidmann, 2001, ISBN 9783487113081
- Prisciani institutionum grammaticalium librorum XVII et XVIII, indices et concordantiae. Curantibus Cirilo Garcia Roman, Marco A. Gutierrez Galindo, Maria del Carmen Diaz de Alda Carlos. Hildesheim, New York: Olms-Weidmann, 1999.
- Prisciani Caesariensis opuscula. Critical edition edited by Marina Passalacqua with commentary in Italian. Roma: Edizioni di storia e letteratura, 1987 (vol. I: De figuris numerorum. De metris Terentii. Praeexercitamina; vol. II: Institutio de nomine et pronomine et verbo partitiones duodecim versuum aeneidos principalium)

Latin/German editions

- Schönberger, A. 2009. Priscians Darstellung der lateinischen Pronomina: lateinischer Text und kommentierte deutsche Übersetzung des 12. und 13. Buches der Institutiones Grammaticae, Frankfurt am Main: Valentia. ISBN 978-3-936132-34-2 (books XII-XIII; first translation into a modern language.)
- Schönberger, A. 2008. Priscians Darstellung der lateinischen Präpositionen: lateinischer Text und kommentierte deutsche Übersetzung des 14. Buches der Institutiones Grammaticae, Frankfurt am Main: Valentia, 2008, ISBN 978-3-936132-18-2 (book XIV; first translation into a modern language.)
- Schönberger, A. 2010. Priscians Darstellung der lateinischen Konjunktionen: lateinischer Text und kommentierte deutsche Übersetzung des 16. Buches der Institutiones Grammaticae, Frankfurt am Main: Valentia. ISBN 978-3-936132-09-0 (of book XVI; first translation into a modern language.)
- Schönberger, A. 2010. Priscians Darstellung der lateinischen Syntax (I): lateinischer Text und kommentierte deutsche Übersetzung des 17. Buches der Institutiones Grammaticae, Frankfurt am Main: Valentia. ISBN 978-3-936132-10-6 (book XVII = first book of the "Priscianus minor"; first translation into a modern language.)
- Schönberger, A. 2010. Priscians Darstellung des silbisch gebundenen Tonhöhenmorenakzents des Lateinischen: lateinischer Text und kommentierte deutsche Übersetzung des Buches über den lateinischen Akzent, Frankfurt am Main: Valentia. ISBN 978-3-936132-11-3 (De accentibus; first translation into a modern language).

Latin/French editions

- Priscien, Grammaire. Livre VIII - Le verbe, Paris: Vrin 2023.
- Priscien, Grammaire. Livre XI - XII - XIII - Les hybrides (participe, pronom), Paris: Vrin 2020.
- Priscien, Grammaire. Livre XIV - XV - XVI - Les invariables (préposition, adverbe et interjection, conjonction), Paris: Vrin 2013.
- Priscien, Grammaire. Livre XVII – Syntaxe I, Paris: Vrin 2010.
- Priscien, Grammaire. Livre XVIII - Syntaxe II, Paris: Vrin 2017.

== See also ==
- Aelius Donatus
