= Summa Grammatica =

Book by Roger Bacon

The Summa Grammatica (Note: In modern references, this standard spelling is typically used, but it is actually written as Summa Gramatica in the surviving texts.) (Latin for "Overview of Grammar"; c. AD 1240 or c. 1250) was one of the earlier works on Latin grammar and Aristotelian logic by the medieval English philosopher Roger Bacon. It is primarily noteworthy for its exposition of a kind of universal grammar.

== History ==
The work is apparently a series of lectures given by Bacon for the mandatory classes on Priscian's work On Construction (Books XVII & XVIII of his Institutes of Grammar) at the University of Paris, where he taught in the 1230s and '40s. Much more than Bacon's later linguistic works, the Summa Grammatica lies in the mainstream of 13th-century analysis. The first part borrows directly from Robert Kilwardby's commentary on Priscian. More generally, the work reflects the speculative grammar taught at Oxford in such 13th-century works as the Logica cum Sit Nostra. It is probable that the final draft of the work which Bacon mentions in his Communia Naturalium was never completed. His Greek and Hebrew Grammars and Compendium of Philosophy may have been considered as part of it.

It survived in two manuscripts: P and W. P is a copy in book hand evidently intended for a personal library. W is a students' copy written in the informal hand of the late 13th or early 14th century.

== Contents ==
The work describes figurative language, rhetorical devices, and irregular Latin grammar using "sophisms" or illustrative examples. It aims to complement Bacon's students' required readings of Priscian's work On Construction by presenting its important points in a more thorough and logical order. It assumes a mastery of standard grammatical rules which the students would have already learnt as glomerelli. It most frequently cites Priscian, but more often adopts the solutions of Peter Helias.

The first section lays out rules regarding grammatical agreement and the rhetorical devices antithesis, synthesis, procatalepsis, From the Aristotelian notion that "art imitates nature to the extent that it can" and under the influence of Averroës's commentaries, Bacon argues that nouns and pronouns can be distinguished from verbs and adverbs owing to the distinction between permanent and successive things. Further, verbs constitute a kind of movement from the subject (Note: Referenced in the work by the terms of art "first item" (principium) or "end from which" (terminus a quo).) to the object (Note: Referenced in the work by the terms of art "end" (terminus) or "end to which" (terminus ad quem).) which imposes obligations on the grammar. For instance, owing to their origin from verbs, Bacon considers that participles and infinitives are too unstable to function properly as the object of a sentence, as "nothing which is in motion can come to rest in something in motion, no motion being able to complete itself in something in motion".

The second section deals with non-figurative constructions including impersonals, gerundives, interjections, and ablative absolutes.

The third section covers illustrative examples by topic in greater or less detail and more or less at random. The primary ones are Moris erat Persis ducibus tunc temporis omnem ducere in arma domum, Vestes quas geritis sordida lana fuit, Amatus sum vel fui, Vado Romam que est pulcra civitas, Video centum homines uno minus, Lupus est in fabula, In nostro magistro habet bonum hominem, Margarita est pulcherrimus lapidum, Quid nisi secrete leserunt Philide silve, and Nominativo hic magister. Most of these examples appear in other collections.

The fourth section analyses short sentences, along with adverbial phrases and liturgical formulas such as ite missa est whose use of ellipsis presented certain problems. It's divided into three sections on "On Some Cases in the Nominal Absolute", "On Mediate Apposition", and "On Some Difficulties in Speech".

== Intentionalism ==
Bacon emphasizes that grammatical rules cannot be applied mechanistically but must be understood as a structure through which to attempt to understand the author's intent (intentio proferentis). The desire to communicate some particular idea may require breaking some of the standard rules. Such exceptions must, however, be linguistically justified. In this he follows Kilwardby. Although Bacon considered an understanding of logic to be important for clarity in philosophical and theological texts, he found his era's Modist analyses needed to be tempered by a contextual understanding of the linguistic ambiguity inevitable in the imposition of signs and from the shifts of meaning and emphasis over time.

== Universal grammar ==
Bacon argues for a universal grammar underlying all human languages. As more tersely stated in his later Greek Grammar:

Grammar is one and the same in all languages, substantially, though it may vary, accidentally, in each of them. (Note: In Latin, Grammatica una et eadem est secundum substantiam in omnibus linguis, licet accidentaliter varietor.)

Hovdhaugen leaves open the possibility, however, that, unlike the Modists who followed Bacon, his own statements on the subject did not refer to a universal grammar but to a universal science to be employed in studying linguistics across languages. This derives from an ambiguity in the Latin grammatica, which referred variously to the structure of language, to its description, and to the science underlying such descriptions.

== See also ==
- Modistae, the philosophical school which developed partially under the influence of this work
- Book III of the Opus Majus
