= Martin of Dacia =

13th-century Danish scholar

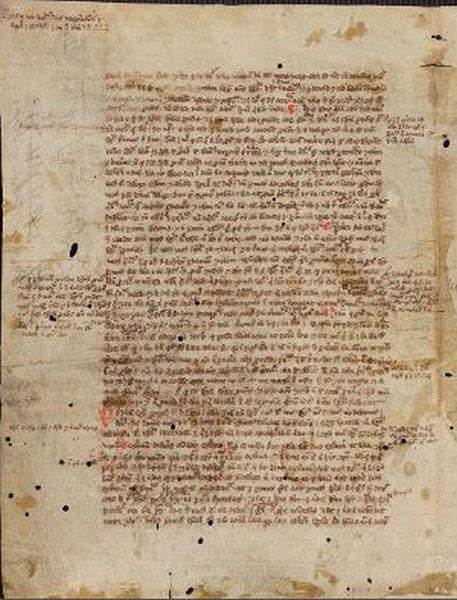
Page from Modi significandi by Martinus de Dacia

Martin of Dacia (also known as Martinus Dacus, Martinus de Dacia, and Morten Mogensen; c. 1240 – 10 August 1304) was a Danish scholar and theologian. He authored De Modis significandi (c. 1270), an influential treatise on grammar.

== Biography ==
Morten Mogensen was born at Ribe in Jutland probably in the late 1240s or early 1250s. He received his theological doctorate in Paris where he also obtained the degree of a Magister artium and Magister theologiae. From the 1290s, he held a Prebendary as Canon of the Ribe Cathedral in the Ribe diocese as well as Provost of Schleswig and Canon of Lund. In Schleswig, Morten Mogensen established a vicarage in the parish of Sywertmanrip.

Morten Mogensen was mentioned in 1288 as royal chancellor of Danish King Eric VI Menved (reigned 1286–1319). In the dispute between Jens Grand, Archbishop of Lund, and King Eric VI Menved, Morten arranged a royal rapprochement to Pope Boniface VIII, which in 1302 resulted in a settlement of the dispute. In 1302 he gave a donation to the chapter of Notre Dame in Paris. He founded an altar for the cathedral in Roskilde in 1303. Morten Mogensen died during 1304 in Paris and was buried at Notre Dame.

== Name ==
The rendering of his name, Morten Mogensen, into Medieval Latin as Martinus de Dacia stems from the fact that, during the Middle Ages, Dacia was the name of the ecclesiastical province covering the entire Nordic region. Mogensen ("son of Mogens") is a patronymic, not a surname.

== Works ==
- Corpus Philosophorum Danicorum Medii Aevi
- De Modi significandi des Martinus de Dacia
- Quaestiones super Artem Veterem

== See also ==
- Modistae

== Other sources ==
- Martini de Dacia Opera (1961) ed. Heinrich Roos in Corpus Philosophorum Danicorum Medii Aevi (Copenhagen: G. E.C. Gad)
