= Salimbene di Adam =

Italian Franciscan friar, theologian, and chronicler

Father Salimbene di Adam O.F.M.
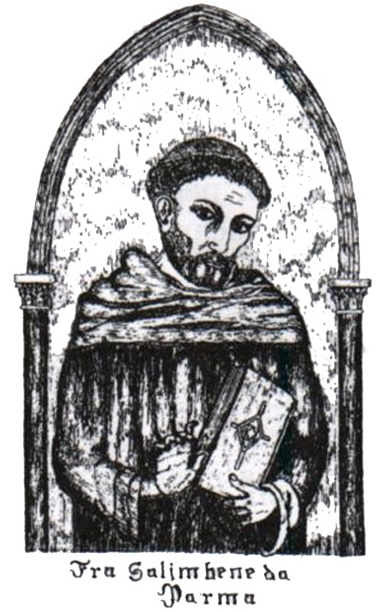
- Salimbene of Parma
- Born: Ognibene di Adam; 9 October 1221; Parma, Holy Roman Empire
- Died: c. 1288; San Polo d'Enza, Papal States
- Other name: Salimbene of Parma
- Occupations: Franciscan friar; Historian; Theologian
- Known for: Cronica ("Chronicle")
- Parent(s): Guido di Adam; Iumelda di Cassio

Salimbene di Adam O.F.M. (or Salimbene of Parma) (9 October 1221 – c. 1290) was an Italian Franciscan friar, theologian, and chronicler. Salimbene was one of the most celebrated Franciscan chroniclers of the High Middle Ages. His Cronica is a fundamental source for Italian history of the 13th century.

== Life ==
=== Early years, 1221–1238 ===
Salimbene was born in Parma, the son of Guido di Adam, a crusader, and Iumelda di Cassio. His parents' house was right next to the baptistery and the episcopal palace. His father's first cousin, Berardo Oliverio di Adam, died in the battle of San Cesario in 1229. His godfather was Balian Grenier, a French nobleman who had distinguished himself at the siege of Damietta during the Fifth Crusade. Salimbene attended the studies in liberal arts available to most boys of his status in the Italian city-states. There he had ample opportunity of becoming thoroughly acquainted with the work of Juvenal, Cato, Claudian, Prosper of Aquitaine and others.

=== Travels, 1238–1256 ===
On 4 February 1238 Salimbene, then seventeen, was admitted into the Franciscan Order by the minister general, Elias of Cortona. He moved to Fano, where he continued his studies under the guidance of Umile da Milano, a disciple of Haymo of Faversham. After completing his novitiate at Iesi, he moved to Lucca, where he remained until 1241.

Salimbene led a life of wandering, avoiding his father who did not wish him to join the Order. From 1241 to 1243 Salimbene was in Siena, where he met the first disciple of St. Francis of Assisi, Bernard of Quintavalle. In 1243 he moved to Pisa, where he remained until 1247. In Pisa he was ordained deacon and met the great Joachimite theologian Hugh of Digne. Salimbene was fascinated, if occasionally skeptical about Joachim of Fiore's prophecies. References to the abbot's writings and models of history are scattered throughout his chronicle. In 1247 Salimbene travelled from Pisa to Cremona, then to Parma, then into France, where he was sent for further study in theology.

The years 1247 to 1249 were the most crowded and exciting of the friar's life. He met Pope Innocent IV at Lyon and then he travelled to Villefranche, where he met and also spoke at great length with Giovanni da Pian del Carpine, the papal legate to the Great Khan, who had just returned from Karakorum. In 1248, Salimbene went from Villefranche to Troyes, Provins, where he met the Joachimite Gerardo of Borgo San Donnino, to Paris, where he remained only for eight days, to Auxerre, Sens, then to Marseille, Hyères, Aix-en-Provence, Arles, back to Hyères, and then on to Genoa, where he was ordained priest in December 1248.

In 1249, he returned to Hyères from Genoa, and then went on to Avignon, Lyon, Genoa, Parma, Bologna, and finally to Ferrara, where he was to remain for seven years, until 1256. During his stay in Ferrara, he began to collect the materials for his Cronica.

The scope of Salimbene’s travels during these years and the extraordinary number of notable figures he encountered offer a snapshot of the mid-thirteenth century, including Pope Innocent IV, Frederick II, King Louis IX of France, Giovanni da Pian del Carpine, Hugh of Digne, Gerardo da Borgo San Donnino, Bernard of Quintavalle, and Filippo da Pistoia.

=== Later years and death, 1256–1288 ===
His seven years in Ferrara were followed by fourteen years in various houses in Emilia, principally Reggio and Modena, and in Bologna. He seems to have spent the 1270s in the Romagna, and by 1283-1285 was back in Reggio again, where he began to write his Cronica. In 1287, he moved to the friary of Monfalcone (near San Polo d'Enza in the region of Emilia-Romagna), where he probably died around 1288.

== Cronica ==
Salimbene's main work was his Cronica ("Chronicle"), covering the years 1167–1287. The Cronica is a lively and anecdotal work, written in a Latin strongly influenced by vernacular usage. It was begun around 1282 and begins with the founding of Alessandria. Salimbene is a very discursive and a very personal writer. He inserts several autobiographical episodes in his Chronicle and gives a remarkably vivid picture of life in France and Italy during the 13th century. He also gives numerous details of internal disputes in the Franciscan Order at the time and provides us with information about daily life among the early Franciscans which we get from no other source.

Salimbene's Cronica is a particularly important source for the history of Frederick II's Italian wars. A Guelph and a Franciscan, doubly vowed to enmity against him, Salimbene wrote of Frederick with a curious unwilling admiration, "Of faith in God he had none; he was crafty, wily, avaricious, lustful, malicious, wrathful; and yet a gallant man at times, when he would show his kindness or courtesy; full of solace, jocund, delightful, fertile in devices. He knew how to read, write, and sing, and to make songs and music."

Salimbene serves as our principal witness to many of the leading figures shaping thirteenth-century society. He provides information that is difficult to find elsewhere. In cases where his accounts can be verified against other sources, the Chronicle has generally proven trustworthy and reliable—even in his harsh portrayal of Elias of Cortona, where Salimbene’s evident prejudices were used to cast the man in an extremely negative light.

== Other works ==
Salimbene wrote several treatises whose titles are known but which are now lost. One of the most significant was the political pamphlet The Twelve Calamities of Emperor Frederick II (“XII scelera Friderici imperatoris”), probably written in 1248. "The Twelve Calamities" was set up as a kind of servant's narrative (Exempla, examples), made to demonstrate the faults of Frederick II - often with loosely fitted biblical quotations. One of the major themes of the work was Salimbene's emphasis on numerology. The work was set up to demonstrate the parallel between the ten plagues and the ten calamities of Frederick II (conveniently he tacked on the last two after the parallel). Emphasizing the Christian nature of his narrative and the non-Christian nature of Frederick, Salimbene turned a phrase used during the crusades claiming that “if he had been a good Catholic and had loved God, the Church, and his own soul, he would scarcely have had an equal as an emperor in the world.”

== Editions ==
Salimbene's Chronicle is incompletely preserved in a single manuscript (Vatican Latin 7260). It was first edited in the "Monumenta historica ad provincias Parmensem et Placentinensem pertinentia", III (Parma, 1857), but the part issued only covered the years 1212-87. The first part of the chronicle, covering the years 1167-1212, was edited by Léon Clédat in his work "De fratre Salimbene et de eius chronicae auctoritate" (Paris, 1878). A fine and complete edition was edited by Holder-Egger in "Monumenta Germaniae Historica: Scriptores", XXXII (Hanover, 1906). Besides an Italian translation by Carlo Cantarelli there is an incomplete one in English by G. G. Coulton with the title "From Francis to Dante" (London, 1906).

== Sources ==
- Herbermann, Charles, ed. (1913). "Salimbene degli Adami" . Catholic Encyclopedia. New York: Robert Appleton Company.
- Scivoletto, Nino (1950). Fra Salimbene da Parma e la storia politica e religiosa del secolo decimoterzo. Bari: Laterza.
- Manselli, Raoul (1960). "ADAM, Ognibene de". Dizionario Biografico degli Italiani (in Italian). Vol. 1: Aaron–Albertucci. Rome: Institute of the Italian Encyclopaedia. OCLC 883370.
- Heullant-Donat, I. (2002). "Salimbene". In André Vauchez (ed.). Encyclopedia of the Middle Ages. James Clarke & Co.
- Cambell, J. (2002). "Salimbene". New Catholic Encyclopedia. Vol. 12: Ref–Sep (second ed.). Detroit, Michigan: The Catholic University of America by Thomson/Gale. pp. 615–616. ISBN 978-0787640163.
- Guyotjeannin, Olivier (2005). "Salimbene de Adam". Federiciana. Istituto dell'Enciclopedia Italiana.
- "Salimbene de Adam". The Oxford Dictionary of the Middle Ages. Oxford University Press. 2010.
