= Albert of Pisa =

Italian Franciscan friar

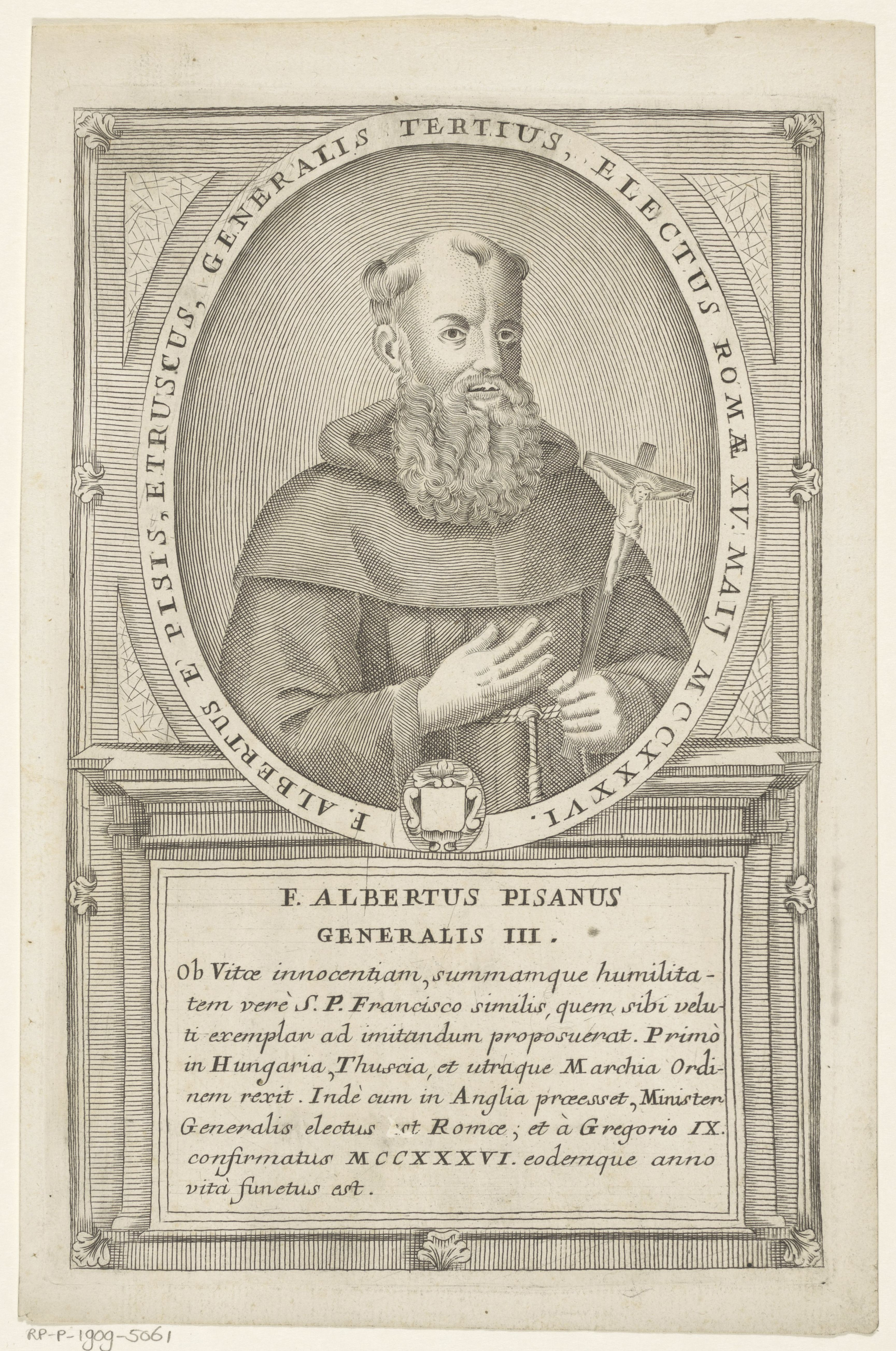
Albert of Pisa

Albert of Pisa, O.Min. (died 23 January 1240), was an Italian Franciscan friar. He served as minister provincial for Germany, Hungary, and England. In 1239, he was elected Minister General of the Order.

== Life ==
Albert of Pisa, was born in Tuscany. According to tradition, Agnellus of Pisa and Albert were received into the order together by Francis in 1211. He served as Provincial Minister in Tuscany (1217-1221), Ancona (1221-1223), Germany (1223-1227), Spain (1227-1230) and Bologna (1230-1232). He was Provincial Minister in Hungary, when, in the spring 1236, Agnellus of Pisa died at Oxford. Albert was then transferred to England, arriving there in December.

Thomas of Eccleston, (who was not a supporter of Elias of Cortona), reported that at the 1230 General Chapter supporters of Elias, who had previously served as vicar general, broke in and disrupted the proceedings. Before the General Chapter of 1239, a number of influential friars met to discuss reform. The Chapter was held in Rome, convened and presided over by Pope Gregory IX. Haymo of Faversham spoke out against Elias.

On 15 May 1239, Albert was elected to replace Elias of Cortona as Minister General of the Order. The Mass Albert celebrated during the Chapter, was the first conducted by a duly ordained Minister General, as none of his predecessors had been priests.

After his deposition, Elias went to Cortona, where he visited a house of Poor Clares without permission. Albert was prepared to absolve him, but Elias went instead to the Ghibelline city of Arezzo, and Gregory excommunicated him.

Albert of Pisa died at Rome on 23 January 1240, and was succeeded as Minister General the following November by Haymo of Faversham.

According to Rosalind B. Brooke, although Albert's tenure was brief, his election indicated a clear rejection, (with Pope Gregory's approval) of Elias' management.

== See also ==
- Bl. Agnellus of Pisa, who preceded him in England

Preceded by Elias of Cortona	Minister General of the Order of Friars Minor; 1239–1240	Succeeded by Haymo of Faversham
