= Elias of Cortona =

Italian Franciscan friar (c. 1180–1253)

- Minister General of the Order of Friars Minor
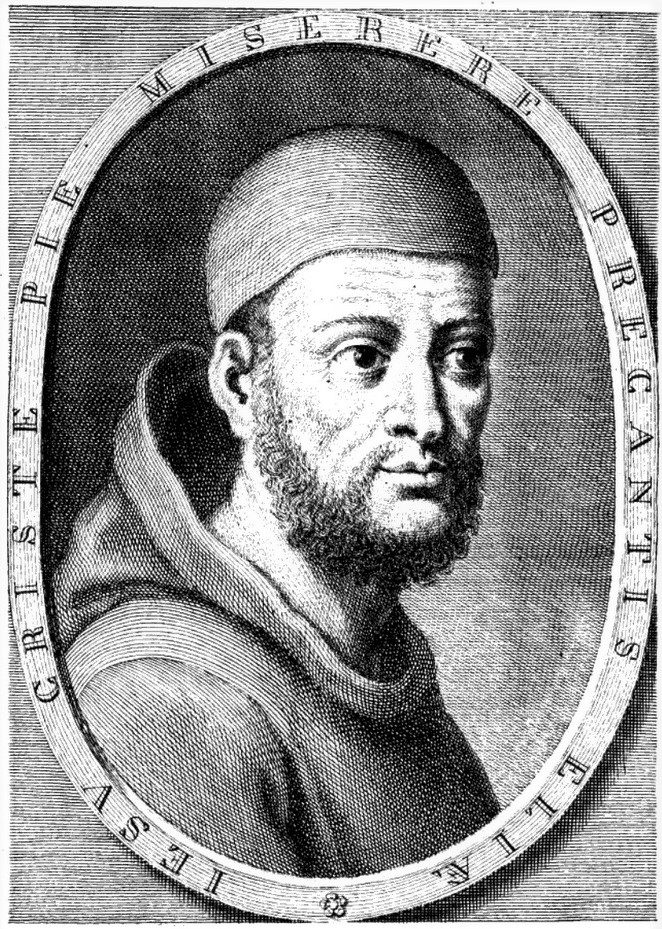
- Replica of a lost portrait of Elia da Cortona by Giunta Pisano
- In office: 1232–1239
- Predecessor: Giovanni Parenti
- Successor: Albert of Pisa
- Previous post: Vicar General of the Order of Friars Minor (1221-32)

Personal details
- Born: Elias Bonusbaro c. 1180 Assisi, Italy
- Died: April 22, 1253 (aged 72–73) Cortona, Italy
- Buried: San Francesco, Cortona
- Denomination: Order of Friars Minor
- Occupation: Friar and scholar

Elias of Cortona (Note: Elias Bonusbaro/Bombarone, Elia Coppi, Elias Cortonensis, Brother Elias.) (c. 1180 – April 22, 1253) was a close associate of Saint Francis of Assisi and one of the earliest followers to join the newly founded Order of Friars Minor. A lay brother, he rose to positions of significant leadership within the order, serving as both vicar general and minister general. Saint Francis himself appointed Elias vicar general in 1221.

== Biography ==
=== Early life ===
Elias's family background is documented by Salimbene di Adam, a contemporary associate. His family name was possibly Bonusbaro or Bonibarone, with his father originating from near Bologna and his mother from Assisi. Prior to joining the Franciscan Order, Elias assisted in his family's confectionery and mattress business and taught children in Assisi to read the Psalter. According to Thomas of Eccleston, Elias later worked as a scriptor or notary in Bologna, likely pursuing additional education.

Elias appears to have been among the earliest companions of Saint Francis of Assisi. The exact time and place of his joining the order remain uncertain, though Luke Wadding, a Franciscan historian, proposes Cortona in 1211. It is clear, however, that Elias held a prominent position among the friars from the outset.

Following a brief stay in Tuscany, Elias was appointed head of a missionary group sent to the Near East in 1217. Two years later, he became the first provincial minister of the then-extensive Syrian province. In this capacity, he received Caesarius of Speyer into the order. While the specifics of Elias's work in the East remain unclear, the three years he spent there appear to have had a significant impact on him.

Elias remained a lay brother throughout his life, never taking priestly vows. He instead served as a skilled organizer within the Franciscan Order.

=== Vicar general ===
After returning from Acre in 1220, Francis brought Elias back with him. Francis had previously appointed Peter Catani as vicar general to manage the order's day-to-day administration. When Peter died on March 10, 1221, demonstrating his trust in Elias, Francis named him vicar-general. Elias held this office for five years until Francis' death on October 3, 1226. He then oversaw the temporary burial of the saint at the Church of San Giorgio in Assisi, an ancient church later incorporated into and replaced by the Basilica di Santa Chiara.

Pope Gregory IX, a great patron of the Franciscans and their official protector as Cardinal Ugolino, entrusted Brother Elias with the task of building a magnificent church to house the body of Saint Francis. Elias immediately began planning a grand basilica in Assisi to enshrine the remains of the poverello.

To finance the basilica's construction, Elias, with papal authorization, obtained the Collis Inferni, a hill at the town's western extremity. He also implemented various fundraising methods, which alienated some friars zealous about poverty, a core Franciscan principle.

Another point of contention was Elias's status as a lay friar and his encouragement of other lay people to join the order. This move faced opposition from many ordained friars and ministers provincial, who also resisted increased centralization of the order's structure.

This internal opposition led to Elias's rejection at the May 1227 Chapter election for Minister General. Despite his prominence, Elias lost to Giovanni Parenti, the Minister Provincial of Spain, who became the order's new Minister General.

== Minister general ==
Elias's ambition for leadership was realized at the General Chapter of 1232, where he was elected Minister General of the Order of Friars Minor, becoming the second to hold this position after the order's founder. However, his succession was met with immediate controversy and caused a rift within the order.

Some of his most vocal critics were early companions of Saint Francis, including the simple Brother Giles, Brother Masseo, and Brother Leo, St. Francis's secretary and confidant. These early followers believed that Elias strayed from Saint Francis's cherished ideal of communal poverty. They cited the grandeur of the new Basilica of Saint Francis and Sacro Convento as examples of this, which Elias oversaw as the final resting place of the holy founder. Despite this criticism, Elias did attempt to uphold the rule of poverty for those closest to Saint Francis, including Saint Clare of Assisi, the founder of the Poor Clares, with whom he had collaborated to establish the female branch of the Franciscan Order.

Elias's administration was marked by a vigorous effort to expand the order. He sent friars to establish new communities in distant lands and authorized the construction of large, monastic-style residences in cities. These residences served as centers of learning and represented a significant departure from the order's earlier tradition of small, scattered hermitages and a more itinerant lifestyle. This development had two key consequences. First, the concentration of friars in large communities led to friction with established clergy in cities. The faithful increasingly sought the spiritual services of the friars, which strained relations with local parish churches. Second, the new lifestyle fostered a growing distinction between friars residing in established communities (who came to be known as Conventuals) and those who, adhering more closely to the original Franciscan ideal, preferred a more austere and mobile existence (these latter friars were referred to as Spirituals).

In 1238, Pope Gregory IX sent Elias of Cortona as an ambassador to the excommunicated Holy Roman Emperor Frederick II. Elias apparently became a supporter of the Emperor as a result of this mission.

A General Chapter of the Franciscan Order was held in Rome in 1239, where Elias was deposed from the office of Minister General. Friar Thomas of Eccleston's account of the Chapter suggests that Friar Haymo of Faversham was a leading figure in opposing Elias.

Following Elias's deposition, Albert of Pisa, the Minister Provincial of England, was elected Minister General. Elias traveled to Cortona without permission, visiting a house of Poor Clares. Though Albert was willing to absolve him, Elias instead went to the Ghibelline city of Arezzo. This prompted Pope Gregory IX to excommunicate him.

Albert died during his first year as Minister General. Haymo was then elected to the office in 1240.

In 1240, Elias definitively sided with the Emperor in his conflict with the papacy. He joined the Emperor's army, even riding a richly decorated warhorse at the sieges of Faenza and Ravenna. Consequently, Pope Gregory IX excommunicated Elias again and expelled him from the Franciscan Order.

Elias faced allegations of being an alchemist. Consequently several alchemical texts have been associated with his name. His authorship of these is however dubious.

Shortly before his death, Elias was reconciled with both the Holy See and the Franciscan Order, with Saint Clare playing a mediating role.

In April 2016, Ave Maria Press published the first popular history about Elias of Cortona titled The Enthusiast: How the Best Friend of Francis of Assisi Almost Destroyed What He Started.

== Appraisal ==
Elias remains a debated figure within the Franciscan community. While a 2016 book reflects a critical view of his role, his reputation underwent reassessment during the 18th and early 20th centuries, particularly within the Conventual Franciscan movement. In 1923, Cardinal Pietro Gasparri advocated for a balanced historical evaluation of Elias, emphasizing the importance of recognizing both his achievements and his flaws.

== Notes ==
Preceded by Giovanni Parenti	Minister General of the Order of Friars Minor; 1232 – 1239	Succeeded by Albert of Pisa
