= Giovanni Parenti =

Italian Franciscan friar

Giovanni Parenti O.F.M.
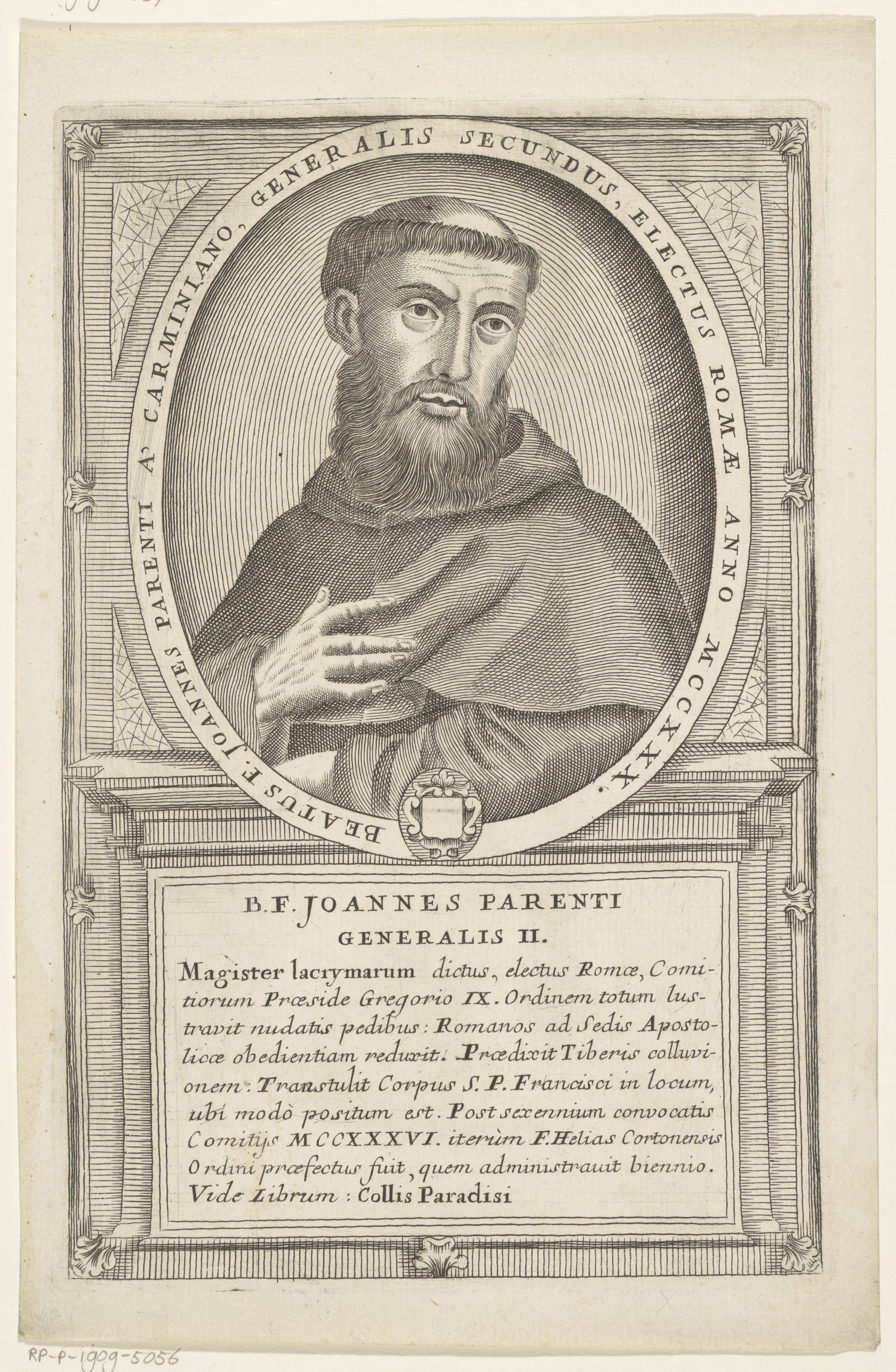
- Died: 1250

Giovanni Parenti O.F.M. (Note: Johannes, Joannes, John Parenti; Johannes Parens) (died 1250) was an Italian Friar Minor and St. Francis of Assisi's successor as head of the order. With a legal background, he served as Minister Provincial in Spain before being chosen Minister General in 1227. Parenti held a literal interpretation of poverty as it applied to the order; a view that was not shared by everyone. He stepped down in 1232 and was succeeded by Elias of Cortona.

== Life ==
Parenti was born in Carmignano near Pistoia. He was a lawyer and judge in Civita Castellana. He became a member of the province of Tuscany. After the General Chapter of 1219, he was sent to the Iberian Peninsula, to succeed Bernard of Quintavalle as Minister Provincial for that region.

In 1220, Francis resigned the office of general of the order, which he entrusted first to Peter of Cattaneo. Upon Peter's early death on 10 March 1221, he appointed Elias of Cortona but retained a certain supreme direction of the order until his death on 3 October 1226. Elias of Cortona, as the vicar general of Francis, summoned the regular Pentecost Chapter for the following year, and on 29 May 1227, Parenti, was chosen as first successor of St. Francis and first minister-general. He has often been regarded as a native of Florence, but probably came from the neighborhood of Rome.

== Minister General ==
As Minister General, Parenti gave the order not to accept apostates, and that no one should be professed without permission of the Minister Provincial. Gregory IX employed the new general on political missions at Florence and Rome, and charged the Franciscans with the direction and maintenance of the Poor Clares.

In 1230, the friars gathered for the General Chapter. There were also many people from the surrounding towns, as this was to coincide with the translation of Francis' body from the Church of St. George to the new basilica. It was then discovered that Elias, with the cooperation of the secular authorities who were concerned about crowd control, had the body secretly interred some days previously, without notifying the Minister General. The celebratory ceremonies went on after the fact.

At the General Chapter, Elias, through his supporters, attempted to take charge of the order; but he was resisted by Anthony of Padua and a number of Minister Provincials. Those who had disturbed the proceedings were subsequently scattered among the various provinces, and Elias retired to a hermitage for a time.

Parenti and Elias differed on their interpretation of the rule. Parenti held a strictly literal view. A delegation was sent to Rome to ask for clarification. The section in question was Chapter IV, which "strictly enjoins on all the brothers that in no wise they receive coins or money, either themselves or through an interposed person." In September 1230, Gregory IX issued the bull Quo elongati. In it, the pope said that as he helped Francis draft the Rule, he understood the founder's intent. Realizing that strict compliance with "holy poverty" was in many ways impractical for both adequate care off the aged and infirm friars, and those friars serving in convents in the towns, rather than in hermitages, Gregory declared that the brothers may appoint a messenger (nuntius), who may receive money from benefactors and in the latter's name either spend it for the present needs of the friars, or confide it to a spiritual friend for imminent wants. The principle of absolute poverty is maintained for the individual friar and for the whole community; still the use of the necessary movable objects is granted them.

Parenti, under pressure to step down, resigned in 1232 at a chapter held in Rieti, and Elias became General Minister.

He retired to the Vicariate of Sardinia. According to the Franciscan Martyrology, he died in Corsica in 1240.

== Sources ==
- Rosalind B. Brooke, Early Franciscan Government:Ellias to Bonaventure, Ch. 3

Preceded by first with title	Minister General of the Order of Friars Minor; 1227–1232	Succeeded by Elias of Cortona
