= Agnellus of Pisa =

Italian Franciscan friar

Blessed Agnellus of Pisa OFM
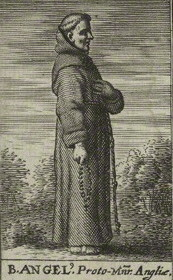
- Agnellus of Pisa
- Born: c. 1195; Pisa, Republic of Pisa
- Died: 7 May 1236; Oxford, England
- Venerated in: Roman Catholic Church (Order of Friars Minor)
- Beatified: 1892 by Pope Leo XIII
- Feast: 13 March

Agnellus of Pisa, OFM (c. 1195 – 1236), was an Italian Franciscan friar. As the order's first minister provincial in England (1224–1236), he is considered the founder of the Franciscans in England. His feast day is variously observed in the Catholic Church, on 7 May or 10 September.

== Life ==
The only account of the life of Agnellus is a brief one recorded by Thomas of Eccleston, a Friar Minor.

Agnellus was born in Pisa in 1195 of the prominent Agnelli family. In early youth he was received into the Seraphic Order by Francis himself, in 1212, during the latter's sojourn in Pisa.

Francis sent Agnellus, although but a deacon, to Paris, where he built a friary and became Custos. He then returned to Italy, was present at the "Chapter of Mats", and thence was sent to establish the Order in England.

On 10 September 1224 Agnellus and his party of eight friars, landed at Dover, courtesy of the Benedictine monks of Fécamp Abbey, who kindly paid their way. When they arrived at Canterbury, they were hospitably received by the Dominicans, a mendicant order that had already arrived in England in 1221 and established a friary in the town. On the way to Oxford, they found shelter in a barn belonging to the Benedictines of Abingdon Abbey, who at first mistook them for a band of ragged minstrels.

At Oxford, King Henry III gave them land on which to build a friary. Agnellus established a school for the friars at Oxford, and asked Robert Grosseteste to serve as lector in theology to the Franciscans, a position he held from about 1229 to 1235. The English Franciscan Order subsequently played a large role in the establishment of the University of Oxford.

Agnellus became known for his humble piety and prudence. In 1233 King Henry III asked him to help arbitrate a dispute with Richard Marshal, 3rd Earl of Pembroke that had broken out into civil war. The following year, he was part of a delegation representing the English bishops at the Roman Curia.

Throughout his life, Agnellus would never allow expansion to the friars quarters, beyond what was absolutely necessary. This practice was maintained for a little more than a decade, until Haymo of Faversham began the expansion of the English order's holdings so that they would be able to provide for themselves rather than depend on others' charity.

By the time of his death, there were forty-three friaries established in the English Province. Agnellus died after a brief illness, on 7 May 1236. His remains were buried at Oxford.

== Veneration ==
His cultus was confirmed by Pope Leo XIII in 1892, and his feast day is kept on 7 May in Italy. The English Franciscan provinces celebrate his memory on 10 September. In honor of his great influence in the establishment of the university. Eccleston wrote that his incorrupt body was preserved with great veneration at Oxford up to the dissolution of the religious houses in the time of Henry VIII, when the friary and church were destroyed. In 2014, the Conventual Franciscans setup up a friary again in Oxford, formally calling it the Blessed Agnellus of Pisa Friary.
