= Franciscans =

Group of religious orders in the Catholic Church

- A cross, Christ's arm and Saint Francis' arm, a universal symbol of the Franciscans
- Formation: 24 February 1209; 817 years ago
- Founder: Francis of Assisi
- Motto: Pax et bonum (Latin); Peace and [all] good
- Parent organization: Catholic Church
- Subsidiaries: OFM (1897); OFM Conventual (1209); OFM Capuchin (1520); Third Order of Saint Francis (1221)

The Franciscans are a group of related organizations in the Catholic Church, founded by the Italian saint Francis of Assisi. They include three independent religious orders for men (the Order of Friars Minor being the largest contemporary male order), an order for nuns known as the Order of Saint Clare, and the Third Order of Saint Francis, a religious and secular group open to male and female members.

Franciscans adhere to the teachings and spiritual disciplines of the founder and of his main associates and followers, such as Clare of Assisi, Anthony of Padua, and Elizabeth of Hungary. Several smaller Protestant Franciscan orders have been established since the late 19th century as well, particularly in the Lutheran and Anglican traditions. Certain Franciscan communities are ecumenical in nature, having members who belong to several Christian denominations.

Francis began preaching around 1207 and traveled to Rome to seek approval from Pope Innocent III in 1209 to form a religious order. The original Rule of Saint Francis approved by the pope did not allow ownership of property, requiring members of the order to beg for food while preaching. The austerity was meant to emulate the life and ministry of Jesus Christ. Franciscans traveled and preached in the streets, while staying in church properties. Clare, under Francis's guidance, founded the Poor Clares (Order of Saint Clare) of the Franciscans.

The extreme poverty required of members was relaxed in the final revision of the rule in 1223. The degree of observance required of members remained a major source of conflict within the order, resulting in numerous secessions. The Order of Friars Minor, previously known as the "Observant" branch, is one of the three Franciscan First Orders within the Catholic Church, the others being the "Conventuals", formed in 1209, and the "Capuchins", founded in 1520.

The Order of Friars Minor in its current form is the result of an amalgamation of several smaller orders completed in 1897 by Pope Leo XIII. The Capuchins and Conventuals remain distinct religious institutes within the Catholic Church, observing the Rule of Saint Francis with different emphases. Conventual Franciscans are sometimes referred to as minorites or greyfriars because of their habit. In Poland and Lithuania they are known as Bernardines, after Bernardino of Siena, although the term elsewhere refers to Cistercians instead.

== Name and demographics ==
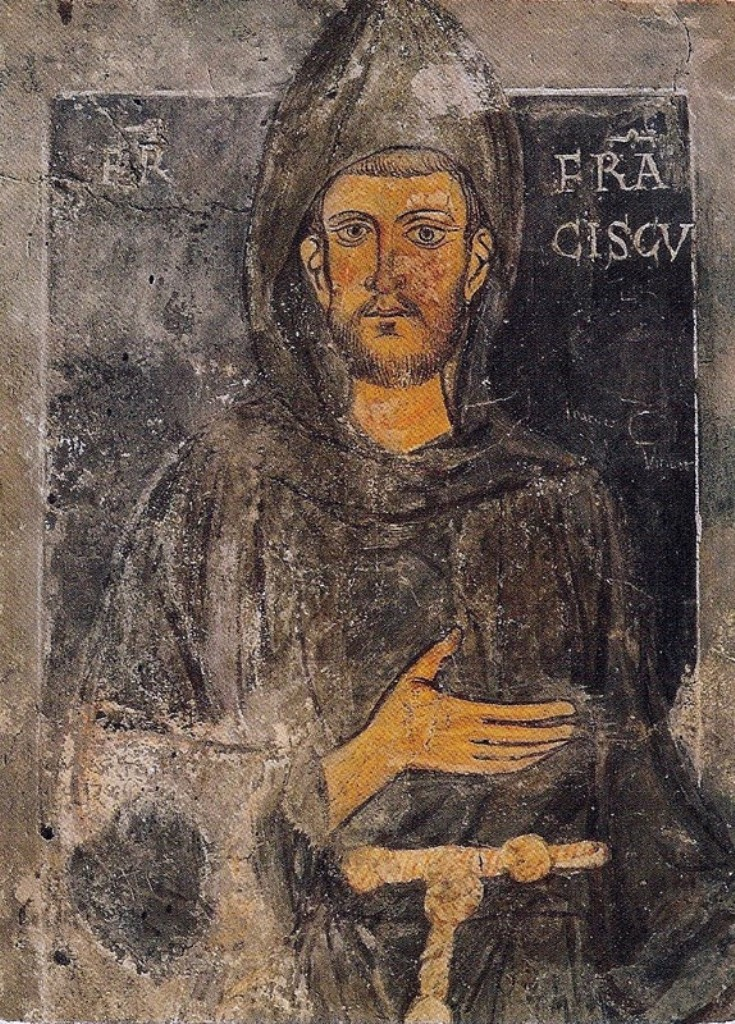
Francis of Assisi, founder of the Order of Friars Minor. The oldest known portrait in existence of Francis, dating back to his retreat to Subiaco, 1223–1224.

The name of the original order, Ordo Fratrum Minorum (Friars Minor, literally 'Order of Lesser Brothers') stems from Francis of Assisi's rejection of luxury and wealth. Francis was the son of a rich cloth merchant but gave up his wealth to pursue his faith more fully. He had cut all ties that remained with his family and pursued a life living in solidarity with his fellow brothers in Christ.

In other words, he abandoned his life among the wealthy and aristocratic classes (or majori) to live like the poor and peasants (minori). Francis adopted the simple tunic worn by peasants as the religious habit for his order and had others who wished to join him do the same. Those who joined him became the original Order of Friars Minor.

=== First Order ===
The First Order or the Order of Friars Minor, or Seraphic Order are commonly called simply the Franciscans. This order is a mendicant religious order of men, some of whom trace their origin to Francis of Assisi. Their official Latin name is the Ordo Fratrum Minorum. Francis thus referred to his followers as "Fraticelli", meaning "Little Brothers". Franciscan brothers are informally called friars or the Minorites.

The modern organization of the Friars Minor comprises three separate families or groups, each considered a religious order in its own right under its own minister general and particular type of governance. They all live according to a body of regulations known as the Rule of Saint Francis.

- The Order of Friars Minor, also known as the Observants, are most commonly simply called Franciscan friars, official name: Friars Minor (OFM).
- The Order of Friars Minor Capuchin or simply Capuchins, official name: Friars Minor Capuchin (OFM Cap.).
- The Order of Friars Minor Conventual or simply Minorites, official name: Friars Minor Conventual (OFM Conv.).

=== Second Order ===
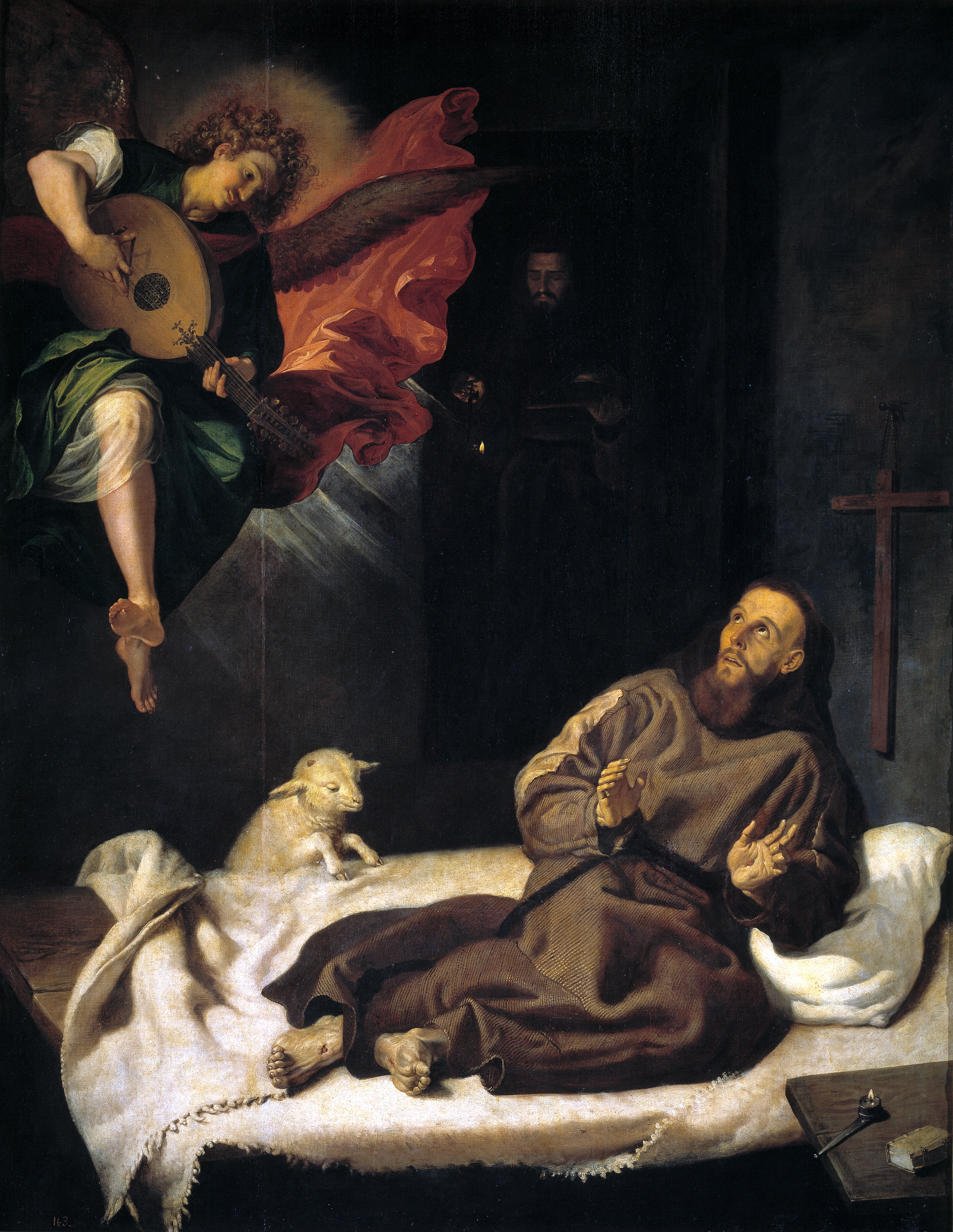
Saint Francis Comforted by a Musician Angel, by Francisco Ribalta

The Second Order, most commonly called Poor Clares in English-speaking countries, consists of one branch of religious sisters. The order is called the Order of St. Clare (OSC). Prior to 1263 they were called "The Poor Ladies", "The Poor Enclosed Nuns", and "The Order of San Damiano".

=== Third Order ===
The Franciscan third order, known as the Third Order of Saint Francis, has many men and women members, separated into two main branches:

- The Secular Franciscan Order, OFS, originally known as the Brothers and Sisters of Penance or Third Order of Penance, try to live the ideals of the movement in their daily lives outside of religious institutes.
- Members of the Third Order Regular (TOR) live in religious communities under the traditional religious vows. They grew out of what became the Secular Franciscan Order.

=== Membership ===
The 2013 Annuario Pontificio gave the following figures for the membership of the principal male Franciscan orders:.

- OFM: 1,915 communities. 12,476 members, including 8,512 priests.
- OFM Conv.: 572 communities. 3,981 members, including 2,777 priests.
- OFM Cap.: 1,542 communities. 10,355 members, including 6,796 priests.
- TOR: 147 communities. 813 members, including 581 priests.

The coat of arms that is a universal symbol of Franciscan "contains the Tau cross, with two crossed arms: Christ's right hand with the nail wound and Francis' left hand with the stigmata wound."

== History ==
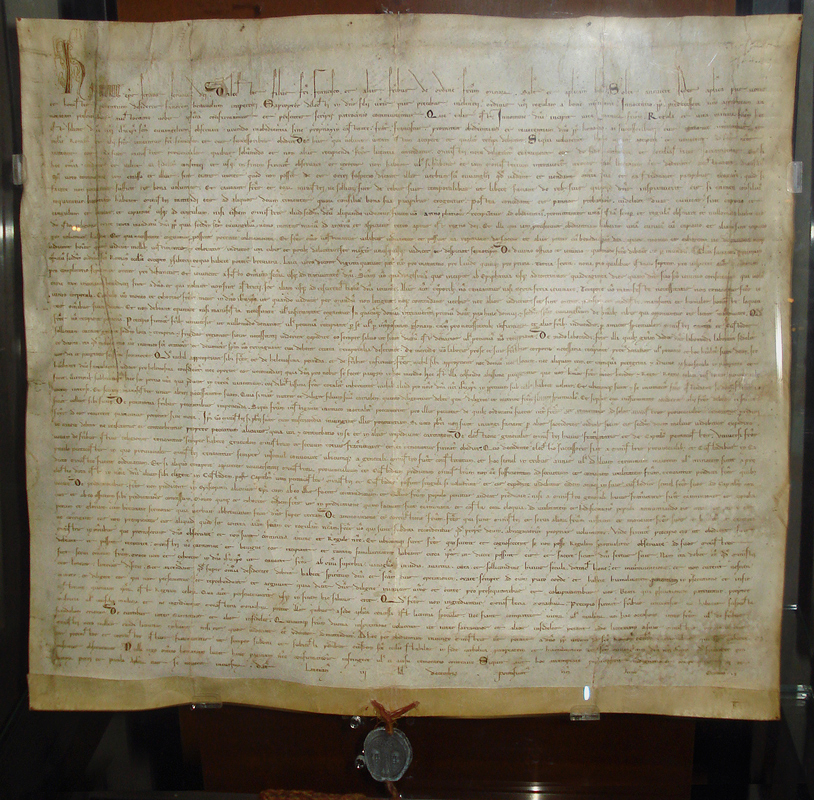
Regula bullata, the rule confirmed by Pope Honorius III

=== Beginnings ===
In 1209, a sermon Francis heard on Matthew 10:9 made such an impression on him that he decided to devote himself wholly to a life of apostolic poverty. Clad in a rough garment, barefoot, and, after the evangelical precept, without staff or scrip, he began to preach repentance.

He was soon joined by a prominent fellow townsman, Bernard of Quintavalle, who contributed all that he had to the work. Other companions joined, with Francis having 11 companions within a year. The brothers lived in the deserted leper colony of Rivo Torto near Assisi. They spent much of their time traveling through the mountainous districts of Umbria, always cheerful and full of songs, making a deep impression on their hearers by their earnest exhortations. Their life was extremely ascetic. Probably as early as 1209, Francis gave them a first rule, a collection of Scriptural passages emphasizing the duty of poverty.

In spite of some similarities between this principle and some of the fundamental ideas of the followers of Peter Waldo, the brotherhood of Assisi succeeded in gaining the approval of Pope Innocent III. What seems to have impressed first the Bishop of Assisi, then Cardinal Giovanni di San Paolo and finally Innocent, was their utter loyalty to the Catholic Church and the clergy. Pope Innocent was responsible for helping to construct the church Francis was being called to rebuild. Innocent and the Fourth Lateran Council helped maintain the church in Europe.

Pope Innocent probably saw in them a possible answer to his desire for an orthodox preaching force to counter heresy. Many legends have clustered around the decisive audience of Francis with the pope. The realistic account in Matthew Paris—according to which the pope originally sent the shabby saint off to keep swine and only recognized his real worth by his ready obedience—has, in spite of its improbability, a certain historical interest since it shows the natural antipathy of the older Benedictine monasticism to the plebeian mendicant orders. The group was tonsured, and Francis was ordained as a deacon, allowing him to proclaim Gospel passages and preach in churches during Mass.

=== Francis's last years ===
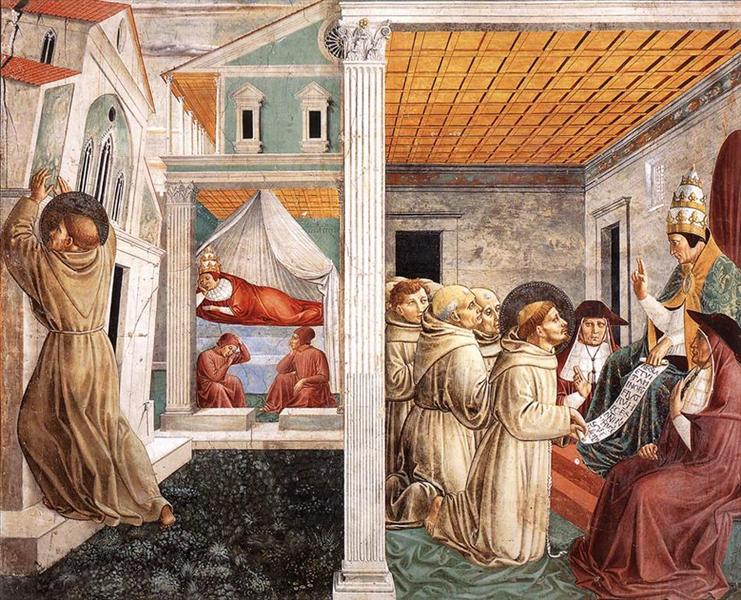
A dream of Innocent III and the Confirmation of the Rule of Saint Francis, Benozzo Gozzoli

in 1219, after intense apostolic activity in Italy, Francis went to Egypt with the Fifth Crusade to announce the Gospel to the Saracens. He met with the Sultan Malik al-Kamil, initiating a spirit of dialogue and understanding between Christianity and Islam. The Franciscan presence in the Holy Land started in 1217, when the province of Syria was established, with Brother Elias as minister. By 1229, the friars had a small house near the fifth station of the Via Dolorosa. In 1272, Sultan Baibars allowed the Franciscans to settle in the Cenacle on Mount Zion.

In 1309, they also settled in the Holy Sepulchre and in Bethlehem. In 1335, the king of Naples Robert of Anjou (Italian: Roberto d'Angiò) and his wife Sancha of Majorca (Italian: Sancia di Maiorca) bought the Cenacle and gave it to the Franciscans. In 1342, Pope Clement VI by the Bulls Gratias agimus and Nuper charissimae, declared the Franciscans as the official custodians of the Holy Places in the name of the Catholic Church. The Franciscan Custody of the Holy Land is still in force today.

The controversy about how to follow the Gospel life of poverty, which extends through the first three centuries of Franciscan history, began in Francis' lifetime. The ascetic brothers Matthew of Narni and Gregory of Naples, a nephew of Cardinal Ugolino, were the two vicars-general to whom Francis had entrusted the direction of the order during his time in Egypt. They carried through at a chapter which they held certain stricter regulations in regard to fasting and the reception of alms, which departed from the spirit of the original rule. It did not take Francis long, on his return, to suppress this insubordinate tendency.

He was less successful in regard to another of an opposite nature which soon came up. Elias of Cortona originated a movement for the increase of the worldly consideration of the order and the adaptation of its system to the plans of the hierarchy. This conflicted with the original notions of Francis and helped to bring about the successive changes in the rule already described. Francis was not alone in opposition to this lax and secularizing tendency. On the contrary, the party which clung to his original views and after his death took his "testament" for their guide, known as Observantists or Zelanti, was at least equal in numbers and activity to the followers of Elias.

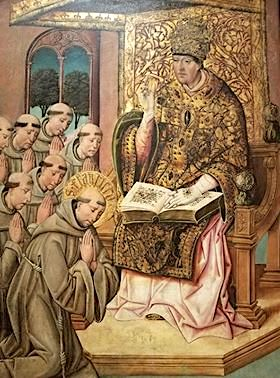
Honorius III Approving the Rule of St. Francis of Assisi, Bartolome del Castro, c. 1500, Philadelphia Museum of Art

In 1219, exasperated by the demands of running a growing and fractious order, Francis asked Pope Honorius III for help. He was assigned Cardinal Ugolino as protector of the order by the pope. Francis resigned the day-to-day running of the order. Francis retained the power to shape legislation, writing a rule in 1221 which he revised and had approved in 1223. After about 1221, the day-to-day running of the order was in the hands of Brother Elias of Cortona, who was elected as leader of the friars a few years after Francis's death in 1232 but who aroused much opposition because of his autocratic leadership style. He planned and built the Basilica of San Francesco d'Assisi in which Francis is buried, a building which includes the friary Sacro Convento, still today the spiritual centre of the order.

In the external successes of the brothers, as they were reported at the yearly general chapters, there was much to encourage Francis. Caesar of Speyer, the first German provincial, a zealous advocate of the founder's strict principle of poverty, began in 1221 from Augsburg with 25 companions, to win for the order in the region of the Rhine and the Danube. In 1224, Agnellus of Pisa led a small group of friars to England. The branch arriving in England became known as the "greyfriars". Beginning at Greyfriars at Canterbury, the ecclesiastical capital, they moved on to London, the political capital, and Oxford, the intellectual capital. From these three bases, the Franciscans swiftly expanded, to embrace the principal towns of England.

=== Development after Francis's death ===
==== 1232–1239 ====
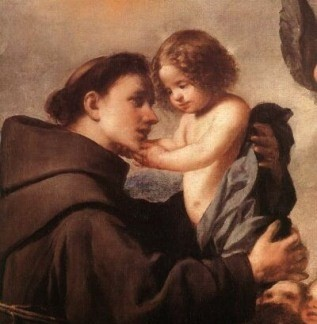
Anthony of Padua (c. 1195–1231) with the Infant Christ, painting by Antonio de Pereda (c. 1611–1678)

Elias was a lay friar, and encouraged other laymen to enter the order. This brought opposition from many ordained friars and ministers provincial, who also opposed increased centralization of the Order. Gregory IX declared his intention to build a splendid church to house the body of Francis and the task fell to Elias, who at once began to lay plans for the erection of a great basilica at Assisi, to enshrine the remains of the Poverello. In order to build the basilica, Elias proceeded to collect money in various ways to meet the expenses of the building. Elias thus also alienated the zealots in the order, who felt this was not in keeping with the founder's views upon the question of poverty.

The earliest leader of the strict party was Brother Leo, a close companion of Francis during his last years and the author of the Speculum perfectionis, a strong polemic against the laxer party. Having protested against the collection of money for the erection of the basilica of San Francesco, it was Leo who broke in pieces the marble box which Elias had set up for offertories for the completion of the basilica at Assisi. For this Elias had him scourged, and this outrage on St Francis's dearest disciple consolidated the opposition to Elias. Leo was the leader in the early stages of the struggle in the order for the maintenance of St Francis's ideas on strict poverty. At the chapter held in May 1227, Elias was rejected in spite of his prominence, and Giovanni Parenti, Minister Provincial of Spain, was elected Minister General of the order.

In 1232 Elias succeeded him, and under him the Order significantly developed its ministries and presence in the towns. Many new houses were founded, especially in Italy, and in many of them special attention was paid to education. The somewhat earlier settlements of Franciscan teachers at the universities (in Paris, for example, where Alexander of Hales was teaching) continued to develop. Contributions toward the promotion of the Order's work, and especially the building of the Basilica in Assisi, came in abundantly. Funds could only be accepted on behalf of the friars for determined, imminent, real necessities that could not be provided for from begging. When in 1230, the General Chapter could not agree on a common interpretation of the 1223 Rule it sent a delegation including Anthony of Padua to Pope Gregory IX for an authentic interpretation of this piece of papal legislation. The bull Quo elongati of Gregory IX declared that the Testament of St. Francis was not legally binding and offered an interpretation of poverty that would allow the Order to continue to develop. Gregory IX authorized agents of the Order to have custody of such funds where they could not be spent immediately. Elias pursued with great severity the principal leaders of the opposition, and even Bernardo di Quintavalle, the founder's first disciple, was obliged to conceal himself for years in the forest of Monte Sefro.

The conflict between the two parties lasted many years and the Zelanti won several notable victories in spite of the favor shown to their opponents by the papal administration, until finally the reconciliation of the two points of view was seen to be impossible and the order was actually split into halves.

==== 1239–1274 ====
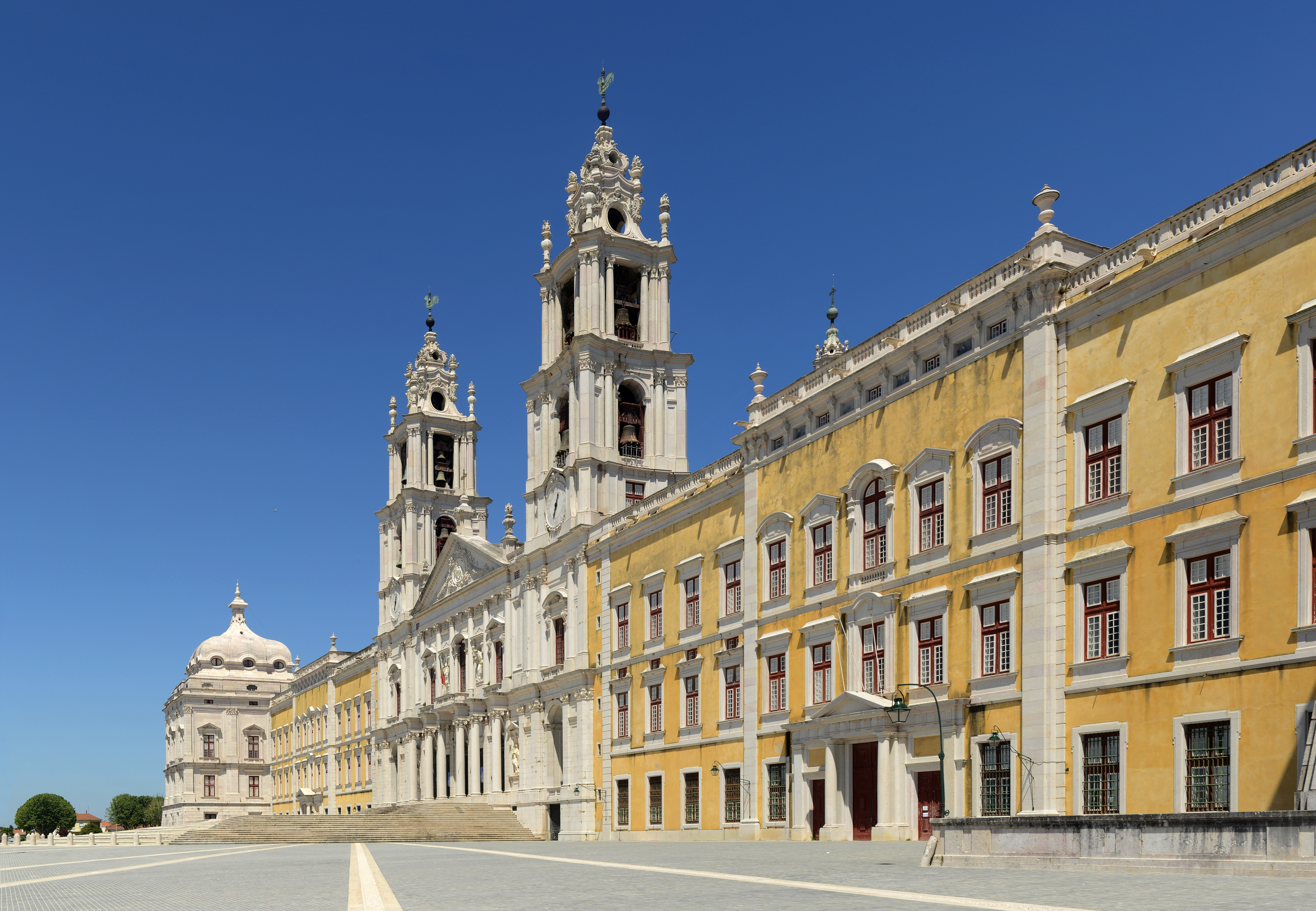
A Franciscan convent in Mafra in Portugal

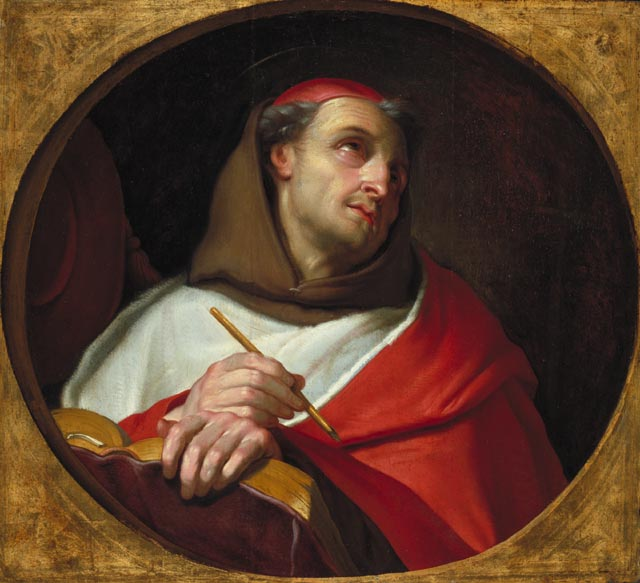
Bonaventure (1221–1274), painting by Claude François (c. 1650–1660)

Elias governed the Order from the center, imposing his authority on the provinces (as had Francis). A reaction to this centralized government was led from the provinces of England and Germany. At the general chapter of 1239, held in Rome under the personal presidency of Gregory IX, Elias was deposed in favor of Albert of Pisa, the former provincial of England, a moderate Observantist. This chapter introduced General Statutes to govern the Order and devolved power from the Minister General to the Ministers Provincial sitting in chapter. The next two Ministers General, Haymo of Faversham (1240–1244) and Crescentius of Jesi (1244–1247), consolidated this greater democracy in the Order but also led the Order towards a greater clericalization. The new Pope Innocent IV supported them in this. In a bull of November 14, 1245, this pope even sanctioned an extension of the system of financial agents, and allowed the funds to be used not simply for those things that were necessary for the friars but also for those that were useful.

The Observantist party took a strong stand in opposition to this ruling and agitated so successfully against the lax General that in 1247, at a chapter held in Lyon, France—where Innocent IV was then residing—he was replaced by the strict Observantist John of Parma (1247–1257) and the Order refused to implement any provisions of Innocent IV that were laxer than those of Gregory IX.

Elias, who had been excommunicated and taken under the protection of Frederick II, was now forced to give up all hope of recovering his power in the Order. He died in 1253, after succeeding by recantation in obtaining the removal of his censures. Under John of Parma, who enjoyed the favor of Innocent IV and Pope Alexander IV, the influence of the Order was notably increased, especially by the provisions of the latter pope in regard to the academic activity of the brothers. He not only sanctioned the theological institutes in Franciscan houses, but did all he could to support the friars in the Mendicant Controversy, when the secular Masters of the University of Paris and the Bishops of France combined to attack the mendicant orders. It was due to the action of Alexander IV's envoys, who were obliged to threaten the university authorities with excommunication, that the degree of doctor of theology was finally conceded to the Dominican Thomas Aquinas and the Franciscan Bonaventure (1257), who had previously been able to lecture only as licentiates.

The Franciscan Gerard of Borgo San Donnino at this time issued a Joachimite tract and John of Parma was seen as favoring the condemned theology of Joachim of Fiore. To protect the Order from its enemies, John was forced to step down and recommended Bonaventure as his successor. Bonaventure saw the need to unify the Order around a common ideology and both wrote a new life of the founder and collected the Order's legislation into the Constitutions of Narbonne, so called because they were ratified by the Order at its chapter held at Narbonne, France, in 1260. In the chapter of Pisa three years later Bonaventure's Legenda maior was approved as the only biography of Francis and all previous biographies were ordered to be destroyed. Bonaventure ruled (1257–1274) in a moderate spirit, which is represented also by various works produced by the order in his time – especially by the Expositio regulae written by David of Augsburg soon after 1260.

=== 14th century ===
==== 1274–1300 ====
The successor to Bonaventure, Jerome of Ascoli or Girolamo Masci (1274–1279), (the future Pope Nicholas IV), and his successor, Bonagratia of Bologna (1279–1285), also followed a middle course. Severe measures were taken against certain extreme Spirituals who, on the strength of the rumor that Pope Gregory X was intending at the Council of Lyon (1274–1275) to force the mendicant orders to tolerate the possession of property, threatened both pope and council with the renunciation of allegiance. Attempts were made, however, to satisfy the reasonable demands of the Spiritual party, as in the bull Exiit qui seminat of Pope Nicholas III (1279), which pronounced the principle of complete poverty to be meritorious and holy, but interpreted it in the way of a somewhat sophistical distinction between possession and usufruct. The bull was received respectfully by Bonagratia and the next two generals, Arlotto of Prato (1285–1287) and Matthew of Aqua Sparta (1287–1289); but the Spiritual party under the leadership of the Bonaventuran pupil and apocalyptic Pierre Jean Olivi regarded its provisions for the dependence of the friars upon the pope and the division between brothers occupied in manual labor and those employed on spiritual missions as a corruption of the fundamental principles of the Order. They were not won over by the conciliatory attitude of the next general, Raymond Gaufredi (1289–1296), and of the Franciscan Pope Nicholas IV (1288–1292). The attempt made by the next pope, Celestine V, an old friend of the order, to end the strife by uniting the Observantist party with his own order of hermits (see Celestines) was scarcely more successful. Only a part of the Spirituals joined the new order, and the secession scarcely lasted beyond the reign of the hermit-pope. Pope Boniface VIII annulled Celestine's bull of foundation with his other acts, deposed the general Raymond Gaufredi, and appointed a man of laxer tendency, John de Murro, in his place. The Benedictine section of the Celestines was separated from the Franciscan section, and the latter was formally suppressed by Pope Boniface VIII in 1302. The leader of the Observantists, Olivi, who spent his last years in the Franciscan house at Tarnius and died there in 1298, had pronounced against the more extreme "Spiritual" attitude, and given an exposition of the theory of poverty which was approved by the more moderate Observantists, and for a long time constituted their principle.

==== Persecution ====
Under Pope Clement V (1305–1314) this party succeeded in exercising some influence on papal decisions. In 1309, Clement had a commission sit at Avignon for the purpose of reconciling the conflicting parties. Ubertino of Casale, the leader, after Olivi's death, of the stricter party, who was a member of the commission, induced the Council of Vienne to arrive at a decision in the main favoring his views. The 1313 papal constitution Exivi de paradiso was on the whole conceived in the same sense.

Clement's successor, Pope John XXII (1316–1334), favored the laxer or conventual party. By the bull Quorundam exigit he modified several provisions of the constitution Exivi, and required the formal submission of the Spirituals. Some of them, encouraged by the strongly Observantist general Michael of Cesena, ventured to dispute the pope's right so to deal with the provisions of his predecessor. Sixty-four of them were summoned to Avignon and the most obstinate delivered over to the Inquisition, four of them being burned in 1318. Shortly before this, all the separate houses of the Observantists had been suppressed.

==== Renewed controversy on the question of poverty ====
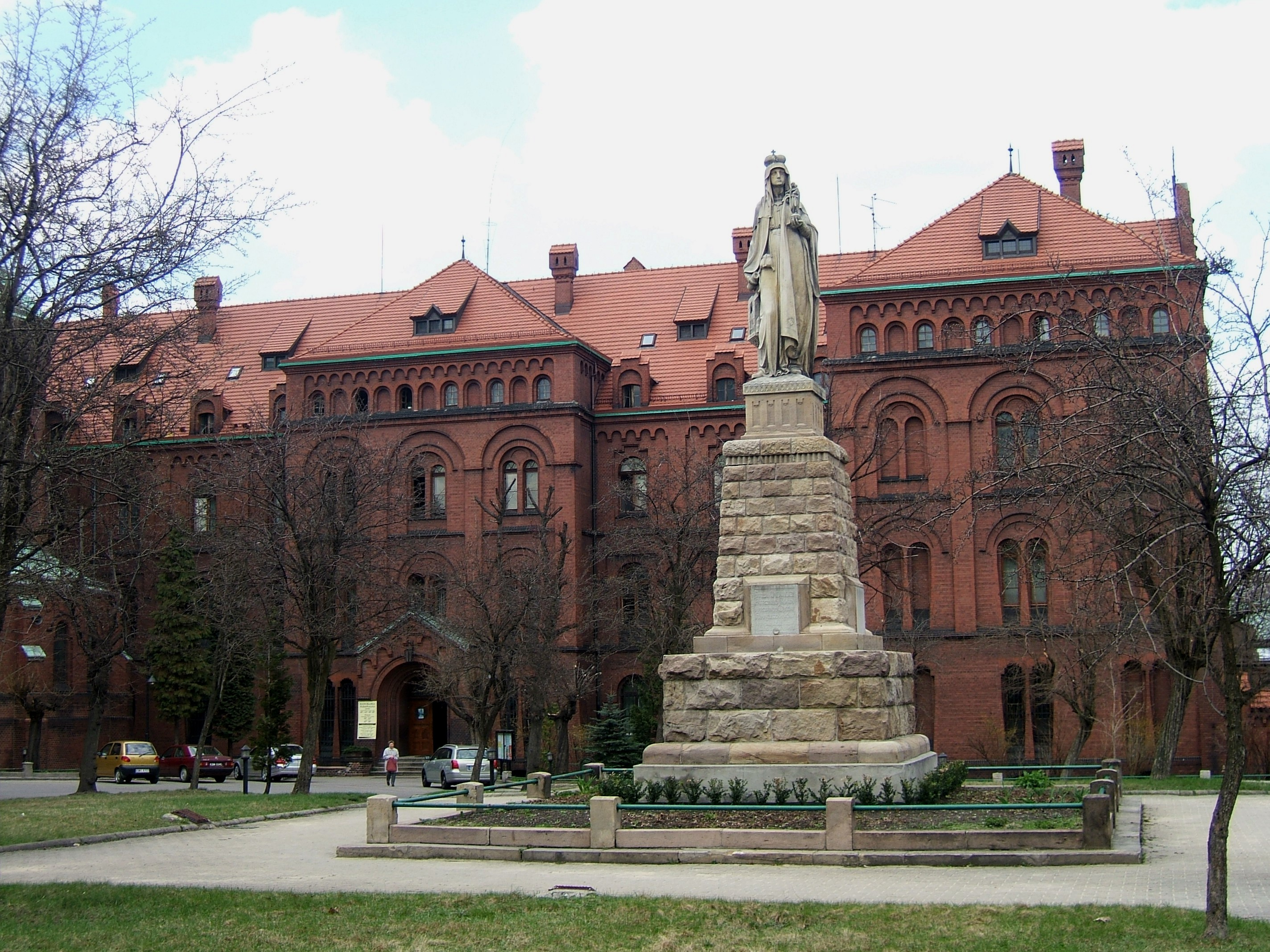
Franciscan friary in Katowice, Poland

A few years later a new controversy, this time theoretical, broke out on the question of poverty. In his 14 August 1279 bull Exiit qui seminat, Pope Nicholas III had confirmed the arrangement already established by Pope Innocent IV, by which all property given to the Franciscans was vested in the Holy See, which granted the friars the mere use of it. The bull declared that renunciation of ownership of all things "both individually but also in common, for God's sake, is meritorious and holy; Christ, also, showing the way of perfection, taught it by word and confirmed it by example, and the first founders of the church militant, as they had drawn it from the fountainhead itself, distributed it through the channels of their teaching and life to those wishing to live perfectly."

Although Exiit qui seminat banned the disputation of its contents, the decades that followed saw increasingly bitter disputes about the form of poverty to be observed by Franciscans, with the Spirituals (so called because associated with the Age of the Spirit that Joachim of Fiore had said would begin in 1260) pitched against the Conventual Franciscans. Pope Clement V's bull Exivi de Paradiso of 20 November 1312 failed to effect a compromise between the two factions. Clement V's successor, Pope John XXII was determined to suppress what he considered to be the excesses of the Spirituals, who contended eagerly for the view that Christ and his apostles had possessed absolutely nothing, either separately or jointly, and who were citing Exiit qui seminat in support of their view.

In 1317, John XXII formally condemned the group of them known as the Fraticelli. On 26 March 1322, with Quia nonnunquam, he removed the ban on discussion of Nicholas III's bull and commissioned experts to examine the idea of poverty based on belief that Christ and the apostles owned nothing. The experts disagreed among themselves, but the majority condemned the idea on the grounds that it would condemn the church's right to have possessions. The Franciscan chapter held in Perugia in May 1322 declared on the contrary: "To say or assert that Christ, in showing the way of perfection, and the Apostles, in following that way and setting an example to others who wished to lead the perfect life, possessed nothing either severally or in common, either by right of ownership and dominium or by personal right, we corporately and unanimously declare to be not heretical, but true and catholic."

By the bull Ad conditorem canonum of 8 December 1322, John XXII, declaring it ridiculous to pretend that every scrap of food given to the friars and eaten by them belonged to the pope, refused to accept ownership over the goods of the Franciscans in the future and granted them exemption from the rule that absolutely forbade ownership of anything even in common, thus forcing them to accept ownership. And, on 12 November 1323, he issued the short bull Quum inter nonnullos which declared "erroneous and heretical" the doctrine that Christ and his apostles had no possessions whatever. John XXII's actions thus demolished the fictitious structure that gave the appearance of absolute poverty to the life of the Franciscan friars.

Influential members of the order protested, such as the minister general Michael of Cesena, the English provincial William of Ockham, and Bonagratia of Bergamo. In 1324, Louis the Bavarian sided with the Spirituals and accused the pope of heresy. In reply to the argument of his opponents that Nicholas III's bull Exiit qui seminat was fixed and irrevocable, John XXII issued the bull Quia quorundam on 10 November 1324 in which he declared that it cannot be inferred from the words of the 1279 bull that Christ and the apostles had nothing, adding: "Indeed, it can be inferred rather that the Gospel life lived by Christ and the Apostles did not exclude some possessions in common, since living 'without property' does not require that those living thus should have nothing in common." In 1328, Michael of Cesena was summoned to Avignon to explain the Order's intransigence in refusing the pope's orders and its complicity with Louis of Bavaria. Michael was imprisoned in Avignon, together with Francesco d'Ascoli, Bonagratia, and William of Ockham. In January of that year Louis of Bavaria entered Rome and had himself crowned emperor. Three months later he declared John XXII deposed and installed the Spiritual Franciscan Pietro Rainalducci as antipope. The Franciscan chapter that opened in Bologna on 28 May reelected Michael of Cesena, who two days before had escaped with his companions from Avignon. But in August Louis the Bavarian and his pope had to flee Rome before an attack by Robert, King of Naples. Only a small part of the Franciscan Order joined the opponents of John XXII, and at a general chapter held in Paris in 1329 the majority of all the houses declared their submission to the Pope. With the bull Quia vir reprobus of 16 November 1329, John XXII replied to Michael of Cesena's attacks on Ad conditorem canonum, Quum inter nonnullos, and Quia quorundam. In 1330, Antipope Nicholas V submitted, followed later by the ex-general Michael, and finally, just before his death, by Ockham.

=== Separate congregations ===
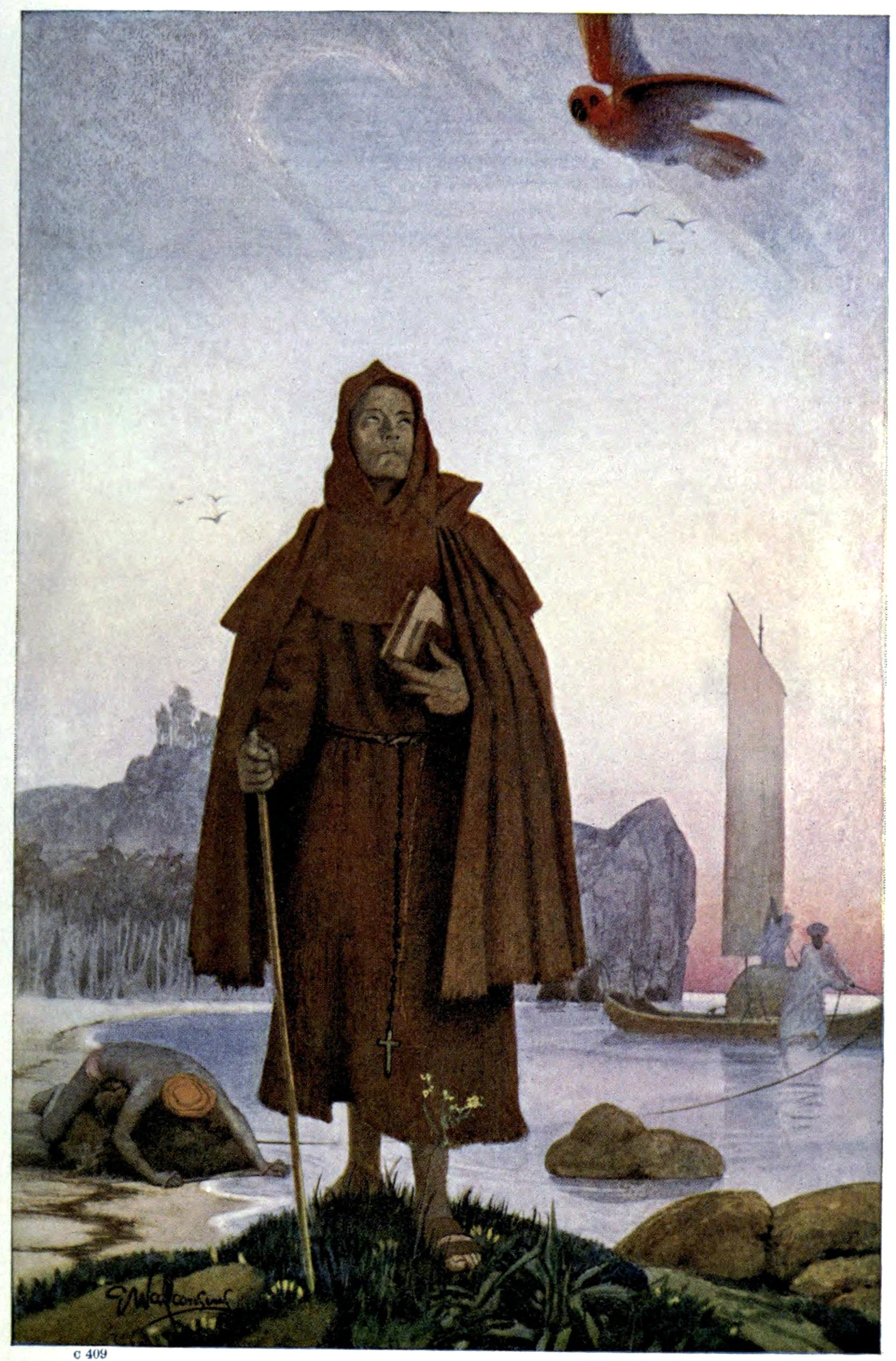
A Christian missionary friar landing in southern India (14th century)

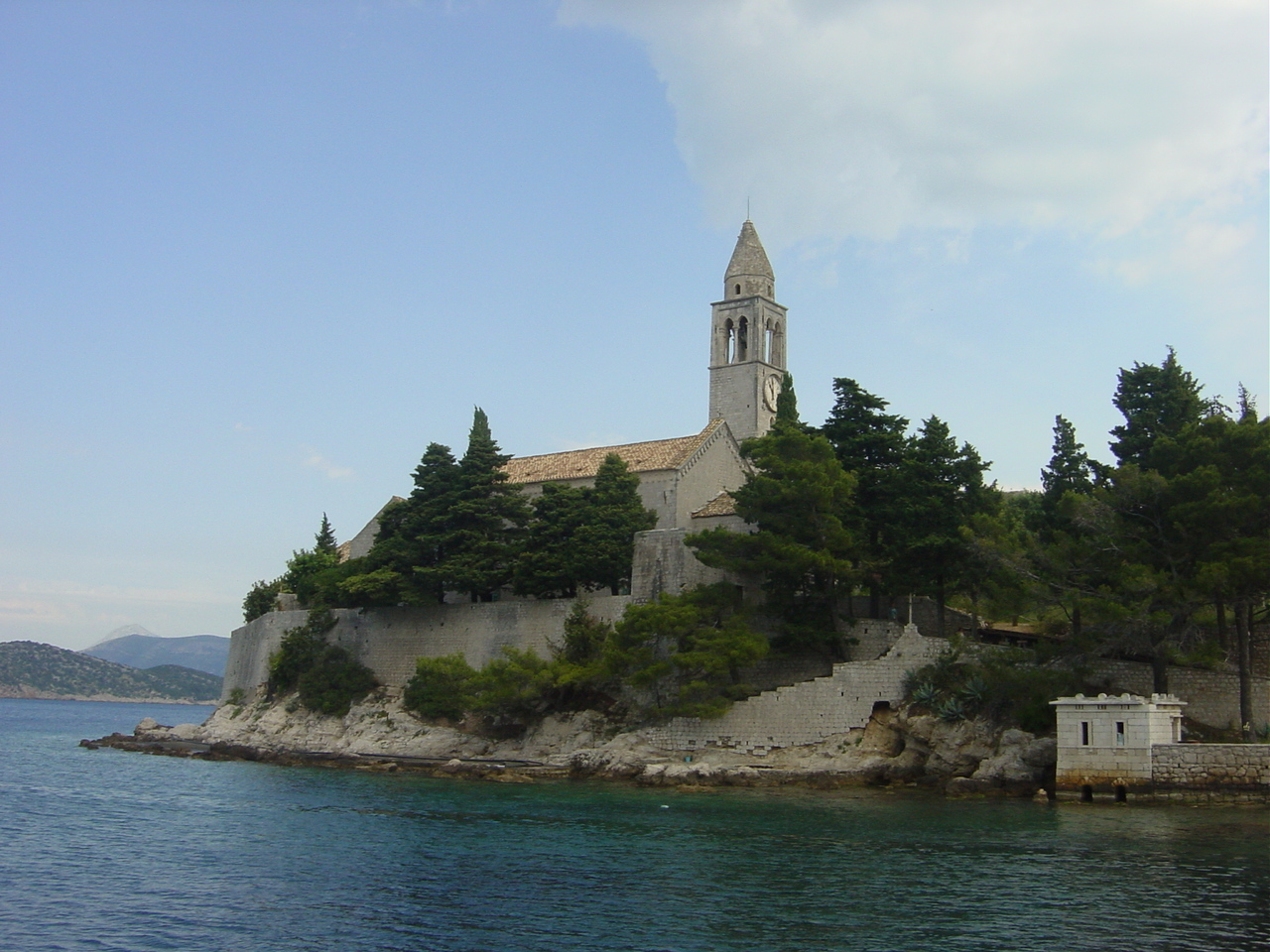
Franciscan convent at Lopud in Croatia

Out of all these dissensions in the 14th century sprang a number of separate congregations, or almost sects, to say nothing of the heretical parties of the Beghards and Fraticelli, some of which developed within the Order on both hermit and cenobitic principles and may here be mentioned:

==== Clareni ====
The Clareni or Clarenini was an association of hermits established on the river Clareno in the march of Ancona by Angelo da Clareno (1337). Like several other smaller congregations, it was obliged in 1568 under Pope Pius V to unite with the general body of Observantists.

==== Minorites of Narbonne ====
As a separate congregation, this originated through the union of a number of houses which followed Olivi after 1308. It was limited to southwestern France and, its members being accused of the heresy of the Beghards, was suppressed by the Inquisition during the controversies under John XXII.

==== Reform of Johannes de Vallibus ====
This was founded in the hermitage of St. Bartholomew at Brugliano near Foligno in 1334. The congregation was suppressed by the Franciscan general chapter in 1354; reestablished in 1368 by Paolo de' Trinci of Foligno; confirmed by Gregory XI in 1373, and spread rapidly from Central Italy to France, Spain, Hungary, and elsewhere. Most of the Observantist houses joined this congregation by degrees, so that it became known simply as the "brothers of the regular Observance."

It acquired the favor of the popes by its energetic opposition to the heretical Fraticelli, and was expressly recognized by the 1415 Council of Constance. It was allowed to have a special vicar-general of its own and legislate for its members without reference to the conventual part of the Order. Through the work of such men as Bernardino of Siena, Giovanni da Capistrano, and Dietrich Coelde (b. 1435? at Munster; was a member of the Brethren of the Common Life, died December 11, 1515), it gained great prominence during the 15th century. By the end of the Middle Ages, the Observantists, with 1,400 houses, comprised nearly half of the entire Order.

Their influence brought about attempts at reform even among the Conventuals, including the quasi-Observantist brothers living under the rule of the Conventual ministers (Martinianists or Observantes sub ministris), such as the male Colletans, later led by Boniface de Ceva in his reform attempts principally in France and Germany; the reformed congregation founded in 1426 by the Spaniard Philip de Berbegal and distinguished by the special importance they attached to the little hood (cappuciola); the Neutri, a group of reformers originating about 1463 in Italy, who tried to take a middle ground between the Conventuals and Observantists, but refused to obey the heads of either, until they were compelled by the pope to affiliate with the regular Observantists, or with those of the Common Life; the Caperolani, a congregation founded about 1470 in North Italy by Peter Caperolo, but dissolved again on the death of its founder in 1481; the Amadeists, founded by the noble Portuguese Amadeo, who entered the Franciscan order at Assisi in 1452, gathered around him a number of adherents to his fairly strict principles (numbering finally twenty-six houses), and died in the odor of sanctity in 1482.

==== Unification ====
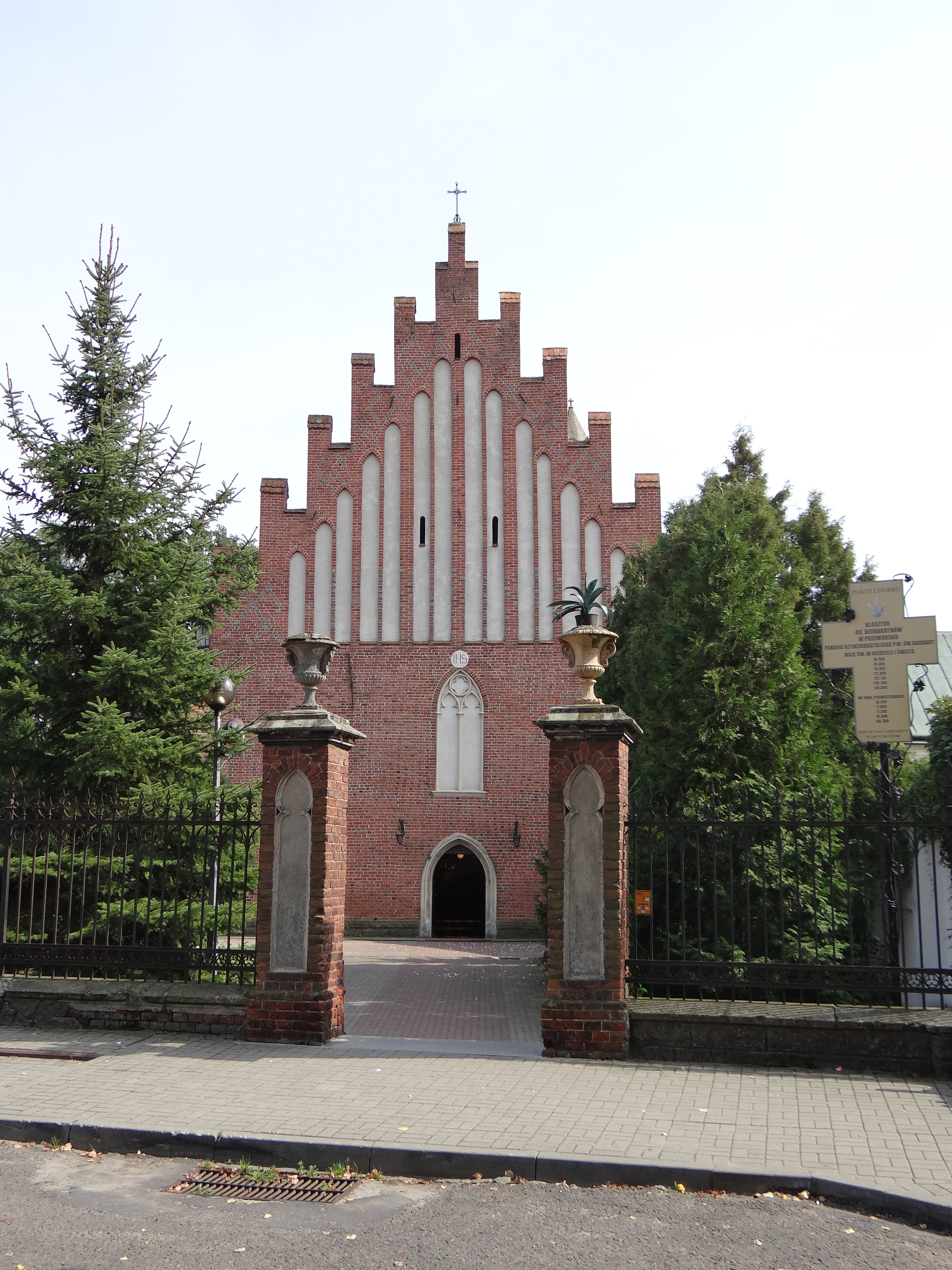
A 15th century Franciscan church in Przeworsk, Poland

Projects for a union between the two main branches of the Order were put forth not only by the Council of Constance but by several popes, without any positive result. By direction of Pope Martin V, John of Capistrano drew up statutes which were to serve as a basis for reunion, and they were actually accepted by a general chapter at Assisi in 1430; but the majority of the Conventual houses refused to agree to them, and they remained without effect. At John of Capistrano's request Eugene IV issued a bull (Ut sacra minorum, 1446) aimed at the same result, but again nothing was accomplished.

Equally unsuccessful were the attempts of the Franciscan Pope Sixtus IV, who bestowed a vast number of privileges on both of the original mendicant orders, but by this very fact lost the favor of the Observants and failed in his plans for reunion. Julius II succeeded in reducing some of the smaller branches, but left the division of the two great parties untouched. This division was legalized by Leo X, after a general chapter held in Rome in 1517, in connection with the reform-movement of the Fifth Lateran Council, had once more declared the impossibility of reunion. The less strict principles of the Conventuals, permitting the possession of real estate and the enjoyment of fixed revenues, were recognized as tolerable, while the Observants, in contrast to this usus moderatus, were held strictly to their own usus arctus or pauper.

All of the groups that followed the Franciscan Rule literally were united to the Observants, and the right to elect the Minister General of the Order, together with the seal of the Order, was given to this united grouping. This grouping, since it adhered more closely to the rule of the founder, was allowed to claim a certain superiority over the Conventuals. The Observant general, elected now for six years, not for life, inherited the title of "Minister-General of the Whole Order of St. Francis". He was granted the right to confirm the choice of a head for the Conventuals, who was known as "Master-General of the Friars Minor Conventual"—although this privilege never became practically operative.

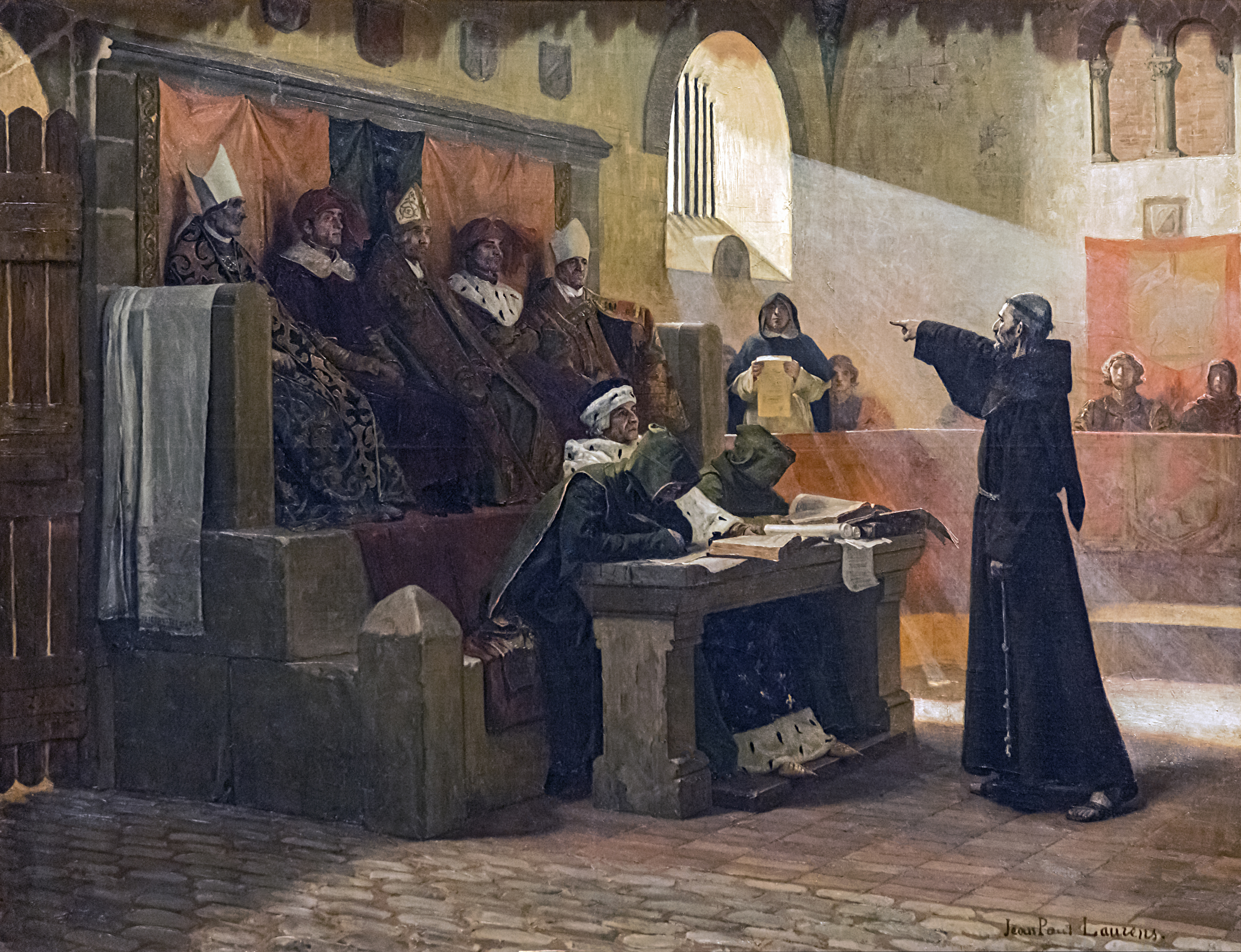
L'agitateur du Languedoc, Jean-Paul Laurens' depiction of Bernard Délicieux’s examination by the Inquisition

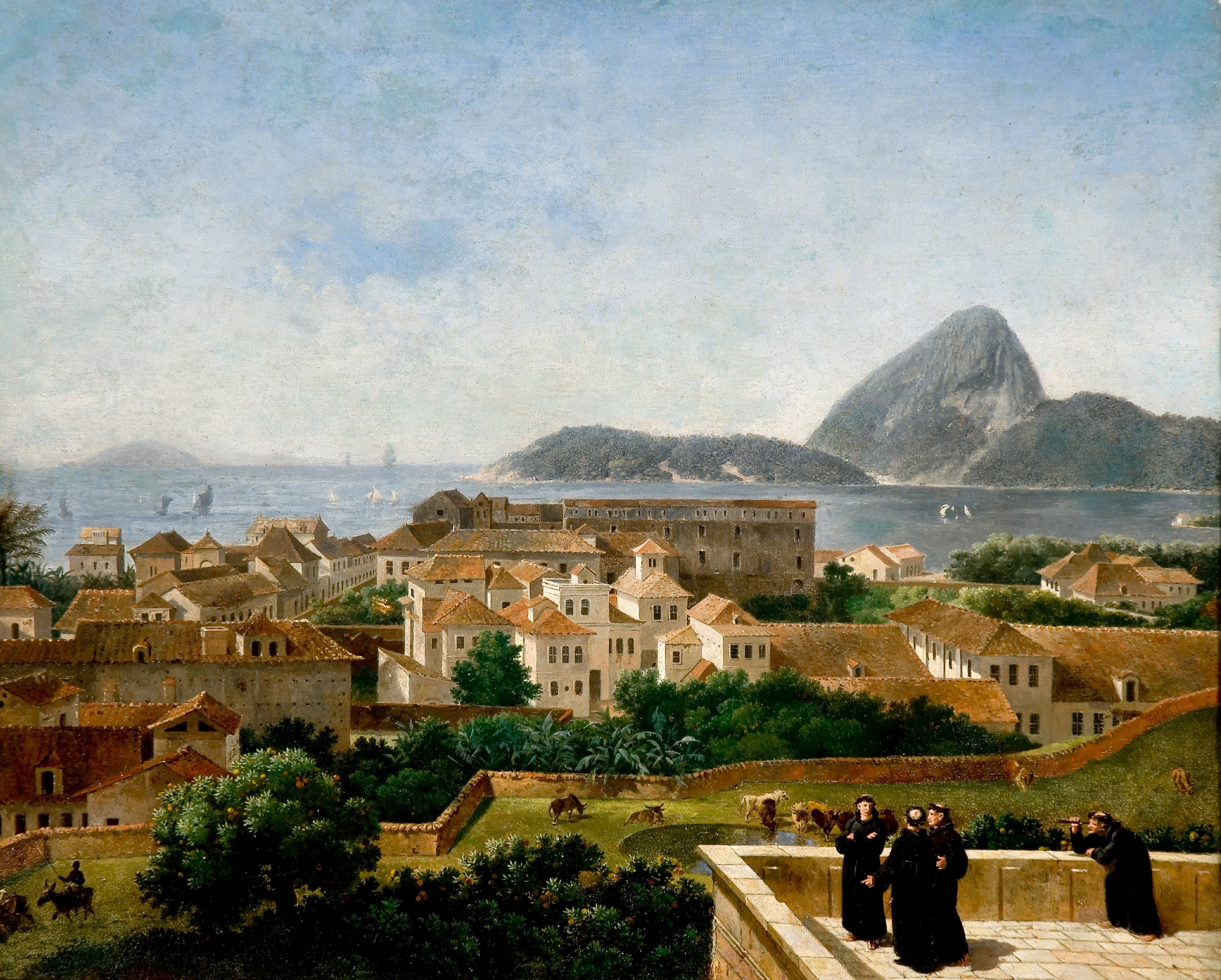
Franciscan friars look at the sea and city landscape from the Convent of Saint Anthony in Rio de Janeiro (de facto capital city of the Kingdom of Portugal at the time), Brazil, 1816

=== Franciscans and the Inquisition ===
In about 1236 during the time of Elias of Cortona, Pope Gregory IX appointed the Franciscans, along with the Dominicans, as Inquisitors. The Franciscans had been involved in anti-heretical activities from the beginning simply by preaching and acting as living examples of the Gospel life. As official Inquisitors, they were authorized to use torture to extract confessions, as approved by Pope Innocent IV in 1252 while John of Parma was General Minister. The Franciscans were involved in the torture and trials of Jews, Muslims, and other heretics throughout the Middle Ages and wrote their own manuals to guide Inquisitors, such as the 14th century Codex Casanatensis for use by Inquisitors in Tuscany.

As well as acting as prosecutors, many friars, particularly those associated with the Spiritual Franciscans and even some Observants, were also subject to interrogation and prosecution by the Inquisition at various stages in the 13th and 14th centuries. Notable cases from the Spirituals include Angelo da Clareno and Bernard Délicieux. Notable examples of Observants include the four burned during the suppression of the Observant houses in 1318 mentioned above.

Some 300,000 Jews, up to a quarter of the Spanish population, had to convert to Catholicism or flee Spain, or were killed in the Spanish Inquisition. The Inquisition spread to the new world during the Age of Discovery to root out heretics, leading further persecution and execution (e.g., Mexican Inquisition).

=== New World missions ===
The work of the Franciscans in New Spain began in 1523, when three Flemish friars - Juan de Ayora, Pedro de Tecto, and Pedro de Gante - reached the central highlands. Their impact as missionaries was limited at first, since two of them died on Cortés's expedition to Central America in 1524, but Fray Pedro de Gante initiated the evangelization process and studied the Nahuatl language through his contacts with children of the Indian elite from the city of Tetzcoco.

In May 1524, the Twelve Apostles of Mexico arrived, led by Martín de Valencia. There they built the Convento Grande de San Francisco, which became Franciscan headquarters for New Spain for the next three hundred years.

== Contemporary organizations ==
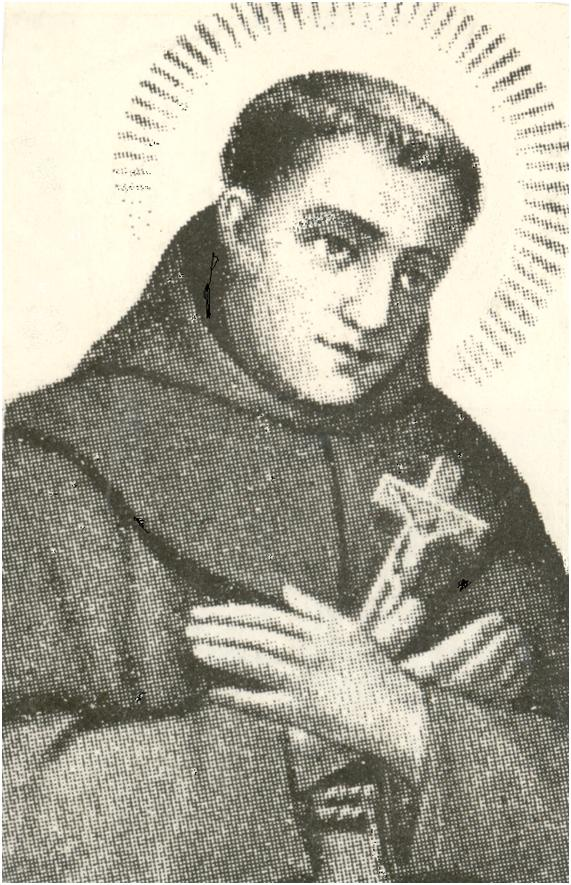
Amadeus of Portugal (1420–1482), reformer of the Order of Friars Minor

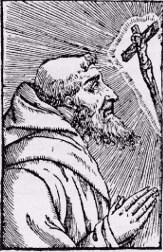
Bernardino Ochino (1487–1564), co-founder of the Capuchin Order

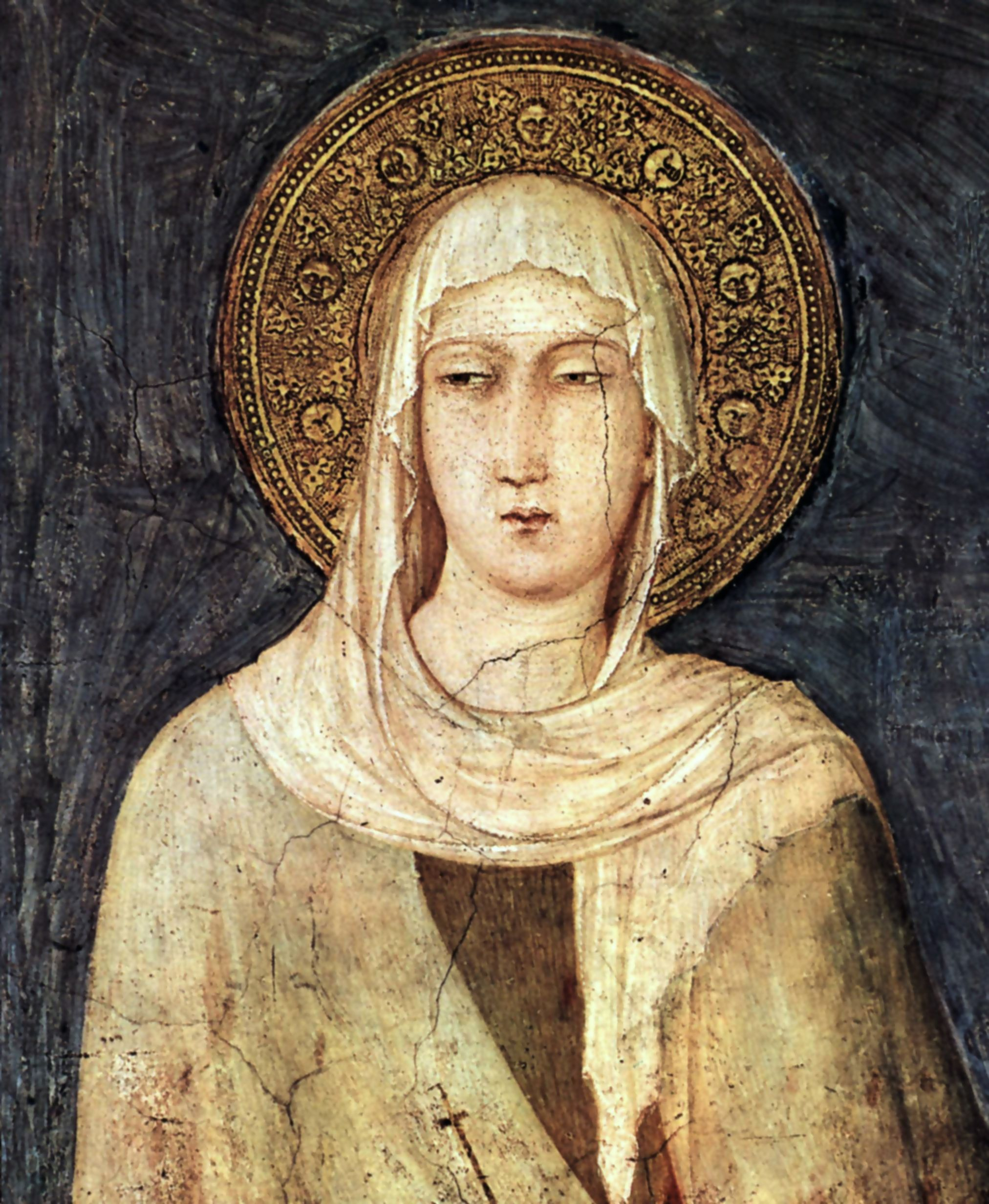
Clare of Assisi (1194–1253), founder of the Poor Clares, in a painting by Simone Martini (1284–1344) in the Basilica of San Francesco d'Assisi

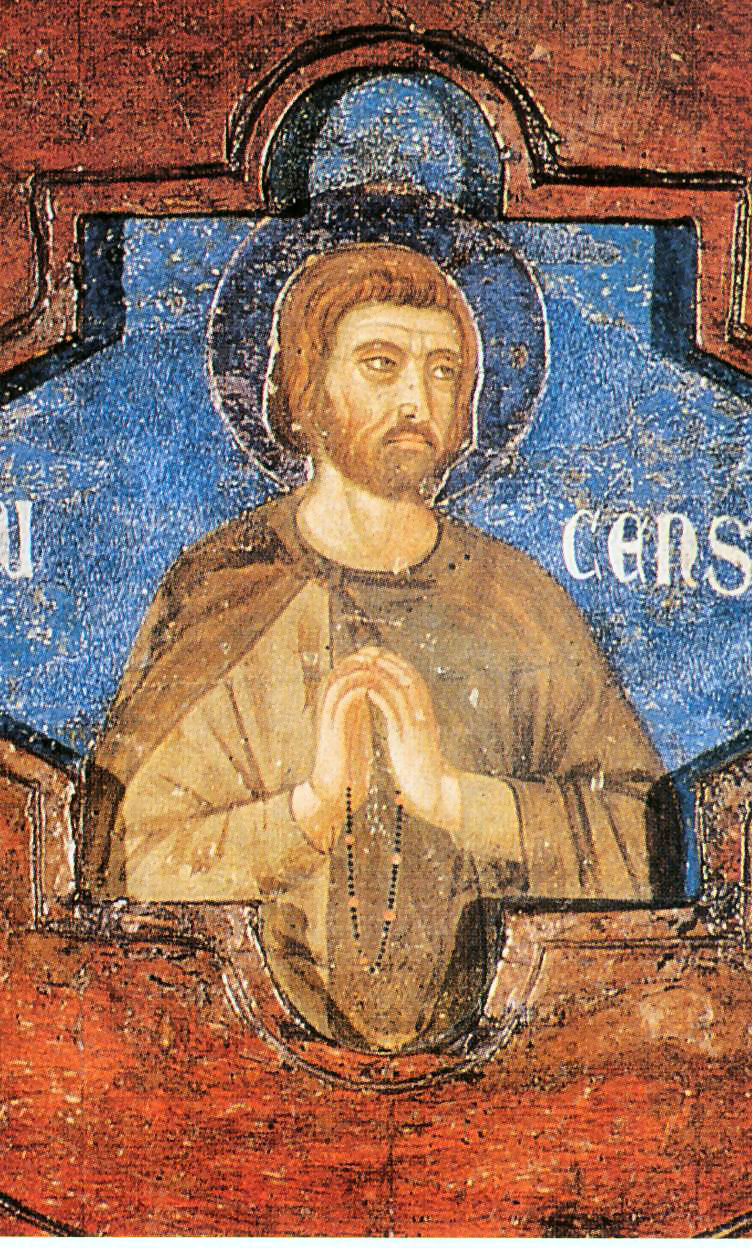
Luchesius Modestini, honored as the first Franciscan tertiary

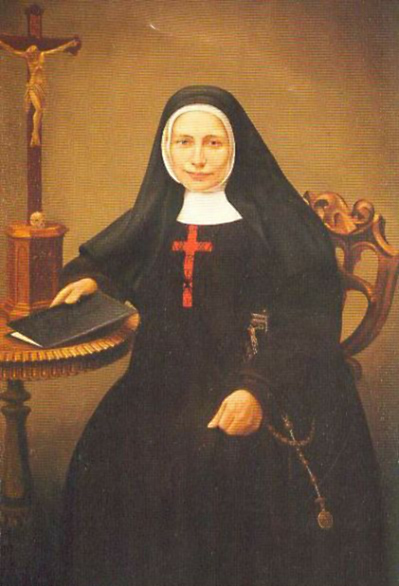
Mary Frances Schervier (1819–1876) was a member of the Third Order of St. Francis who became the foundress of the Poor Sisters of St. Francis, founded to serve the needy.

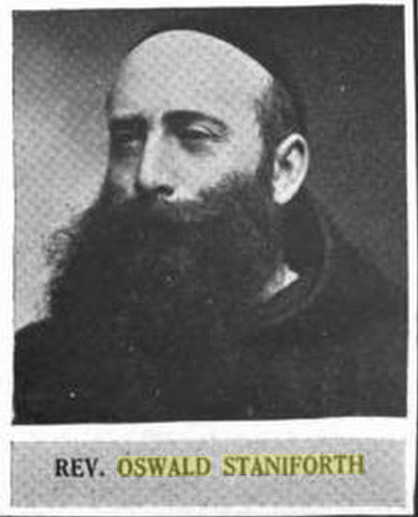
Oswald Staniforth, a 19th-century friar

=== First Order ===
==== Order of Friars Minor ====
The Order of Friars Minor (OFM) has 1,500 houses in about 100 provinces and custodiae, with about 16,000 members. In 1897, Pope Leo XIII combined the Observants, Discalced (Alcantarines), Recollects, and Riformati into one order under general constitutions. While the Capuchins and Conventuals wanted the reunited Observants to be referred to as The Order of Friars Minor of the Leonine Union, they were instead called simply the Order of Friars Minor. Despite the tensions caused by this forced union, the Order grew from 1897 to reach a peak of 26,000 members in the 1960s before declining after the 1970s. The Order is headed by a Minister General, who since July 2021 is Father Massimo Fusarelli.

==== Order of Friars Minor Conventual ====
The Order of Friars Minor Conventual (OFM Conv.) consists of 290 houses worldwide, with a total of almost 5,000 friars. They have experienced growth in this century throughout the world. They are located in Italy, the United States, Canada, Australia, and throughout Latin America, and Africa. They are the largest in number in Poland because of the work and inspiration of Maximilian Kolbe.

==== Order of Friars Minor Capuchin ====
The Order of Friars Minor Capuchin (OFM Cap.) are the youngest branch of Franciscans, founded in 1525 by Matteo Serafini (Matteo Bassi, Matteo da Bascio), an Observant friar, who felt himself called to an even stricter observance of Franciscan austerity. With the support of the Papal Court, the new branch received early recognition and grew fast, first in Italy and after 1574 all over Europe and throughout the world. The Capuchins eventually became a separate order in 1619.

The name Capuchins refers to the particular shape of the long hood or capuce. Originally a popular nickname, it has become a part of the official name of the order. The order now exists in 106 countries all over the world, with around 10,500 brothers living in more than 1,700 communities, known as fraternities, or friaries.

=== Second Order ===
==== Poor Clares ====
The Poor Clares, officially the Order of Saint Clare, are members of a contemplative order of nuns in the Catholic Church. The Poor Clares were the second Franciscan order to be established. Founded by Clare of Assisi and Francis of Assisi on Palm Sunday in 1212, they were organized after the Order of Friars Minor (the first order), and before the Third Order of Saint Francis. In 2011, there were over 20,000 Poor Clare nuns in over 75 countries throughout the world. They follow several different observances and are organized into federations.

The Poor Clares follow the Rule of St. Clare which was approved by Pope Innocent IV the day before Clare's death in 1253. The main branch of the Order (OSC) follows the observance of Pope Urban. Other branches established since that time, who operate under their own unique constitutions, are the Colettine Poor Clares (PCC – founded 1410), the Capuchin Poor Clares (OSC Cap. – founded 1538), and the Poor Clares of Perpetual Adoration (PCPA – founded 1854).

=== Third Order ===
The Third Order of Saint Francis comprises people who desired to grow in holiness in their daily lives without entering monastic life. After founding the Friars Minor and seeing a need, Francis created a way of life to which married men and women, as well as the single and the secular clergy, could belong and live according to the Gospel.

==== Secular Franciscan Order ====
The Secular Franciscan Order, prior to 1978 also known as the Third Order Secular of Saint Francis, is an order founded by Francis in 1212 for brothers and sisters who do not live in a religious community. Members of the order continue to live secular lives, and gather regularly for fraternal activities. In the United States alone there are 17,000 professed members of the order.

Members of the Order live according to a Rule composed by St Francis in 1221. The Rule was slightly modified through the centuries and was replaced at the turn of the 20th century by Pope Leo XIII, himself a member of the Order. A new and current Rule was approved by Pope Paul VI in 1978, and the Third Order was renamed the Secular Franciscan Order. It is an international organization with its own Minister General based in Rome.

==== Third Order Regular ====
Within a century of the death of Francis, members of the Third Order began to live in common, in an attempt to follow a more ascetical way of life. Angela of Foligno (+1309) was foremost among those who achieved great depths in their lives of prayer and service of the poor, while living in community with other women of the Order.

Among the men, the Third Order Regular of St. Francis of Penance was formed in 1447 by a papal decree that united several communities of hermits, following the Third Order Rule, into a single Order, with its own Minister General. Today it is an international community of friars who desire to emphasize the works of mercy and on-going conversion. The community is also known as the Franciscan Friars, TOR, and they strive to "rebuild the Church" in areas of high school and college education, parish ministry, church renewal, social justice, campus ministry, hospital chaplaincies, foreign missions, and other ministries in places where the church is needed.

The association of Franciscans (Grey Friars) with education became a stock fictional reference in, for example, the works of Thackeray ("Grey Friars School" in Pendennis and The Newcomes) or of "Frank Richards" (Greyfriars School of Billy Bunter fame).

After the formal recognition of the members of religious tertiary communities, the following centuries saw a steady growth of such communities across Europe. Initially, the women's communities took a monastic form of life, either voluntarily or under pressure from ecclesiastical superiors. The great figure of this development was Hyacintha Mariscotti. As Europe entered the upheavals of the modern age, new communities arose which were able to focus more exclusively on social service, especially during the immediate post-Napoleonic period which devastated much of Western Europe. An example of this is Mary Frances Schervier (1819–1876).

===== Third Order Regular in North America =====
This movement continued in North America as congregations arose from one coast to another, in answer to the needs of the large emigrant communities that were flooding the cities of the United States and Canada.

The Third Order Regular of the Brothers of the Poor of St. Francis of Assisi, CFP, are an active community, based in the United States, with houses in Belgium, The Netherlands, Germany, and Brazil. These Franciscans strive to live an integrated life through prayer, community, and ministry to the poor, neglected and disadvantaged youth, the powerless, people in need, and the elderly. The Brothers of the Poor live by their vows of poverty (living a simple lifestyle), consecrated chastity (loving all, possessing no one, striving sincerely, for singleness of heart, a celibate way of loving and being loved), and obedience (to God, to the community, to the church, and to self).

The Brothers of the Poor serve persons with AIDS and people who ask for help, regardless of their religion or their social/economic background. They are teachers, childcare workers, social workers, counselors, pastoral ministers, retreat ministers, religious educators, and school administrators, along with other tasks.

The Regular Tertiaries, officially the Third Order Regular of St. Francis of Penance, who operate the Franciscan University of Steubenville, follow a rule approved by Pope Leo X. Today this group is present in 17 countries: Italy, Croatia, Spain, France, Germany, Austria, US, India, Sri Lanka, South Africa, Brazil, Paraguay, Mexico, Peru, Sweden, Bangladesh, and the Philippines.

==== Brothers and Sisters of Penance of St. Francis ====
The Brothers and Sisters of Penance of St. Francis, is a private confraternity of the Catholic Church, whose members strive to model their lives according to the Rule and Statutes of the Primitive Rule of the Third Order of St. Francis, which was written for lay people in 1221 by Francis of Assisi. Right now there are several hundred members within the United States and a few hundred more throughout the world. The order was started in 1996 by members of the Archdiocese of St. Paul in Minnesota.

==== Other tertiaries ====
- In 1435, Francis of Paola founded the "Poor Hermits of Saint Francis of Assisi", later known as the "Hermits of the Order of Minims", and then renamed the "Order of Minims" in 1506 by Pope Julius II. There are mendicant friars, contemplative nuns, and lay tertiaries.
- The Society of the Atonement, also known as Graymoor Friars and Graymoor Sisters, started in 1898 as a religious community in the Episcopal Church. It came into union with the Holy See in 1909.
- The Franciscan Friars of the Immaculate started in 1970, and became an institute with Pontifical Right in 1998. In that same year, the Franciscan Sisters of the Immaculate became an institute with Pontifical Right. There are also Third Order Franciscan Sisters of the Immaculate, an offshoot of the Franciscan Tertiaries of the Immaculate.

=== Other Franciscan organizations ===
- The Community of the Franciscan Friars of the Renewal started in 1987, and the Franciscan Sisters of the Renewal in 1988.
- The Franciscan Missionaries of the Eternal Word started in 1987, and are now a Public Clerical Association of the Faithful.
- Franciscans International is a Non-governmental organization (NGO) with General Consultative status at the United Nations, uniting the voices of Franciscan brothers and sisters from around the world. It operates under the sponsorship of the Conference of the Franciscan Family (CFF) and serves all Franciscans and the global community by bringing grassroots Franciscans to the United Nations forums in New York City and Geneva. It brings the spiritual and ethical values of the Franciscans to the United Nations and international organisations.

=== Other Christian traditions ===
There are Franciscan orders in Lutheran Churches, including the Order of Lutheran Franciscans, the Evangelical Sisterhood of Mary, and the Evangelische Kanaan Franziskus-Bruderschaft (Kanaan Franciscan Brothers). Established in 2006, the Order of St. Francis-Lutheran (OSF-L) operates under the auspices of the Lutheran Church-International. The OSF-L is based in St. Catharines, Ontario, Canada.

In the United States, the Evangelical Society of the Cross Franciscan (the Lutheran Third Order of St. Francis) was founded in 1988 in Orlando, Florida. It was blessed by Bishop Lavern Franzen of the Evangelical Lutheran Church in America.

One of the results of the Oxford Movement in the Anglican Communion during the 19th century was the re-establishment of religious orders in the Church of England, including some of Franciscan inspiration. The principal Anglican communities in the Franciscan tradition are the Community of St. Francis (women, founded 1905) (CSF), the Poor Clares of Reparation (PCR), the Society of Saint Francis (men, founded 1934)(SSF), the Community of St. Clare (women, enclosed) (OSC), and the Order of St. Francis (men, founded in 2003). There is a Third Order known as the Third Order Society of St Francis (TSSF), and the Lesser Franciscans. There is an order of Sisters of St. Clare in the Puget Sound area of Washington state (Diocese of Olympia), the Little Sisters of St. Clare.

There are some small Franciscan communities within the Old Catholic Church. There are also some in the Continental Reformed Churches.

There are associations of Franciscan inspiration that describe themselves as ecumenical - accepting Christians of all denominations, the Order of Ecumenical Franciscans being an example. The Companions of Francis Apostolic Religious Institute (CFARI), with its roots in independent Catholicism, is a dispersed, egalitarian and ecumenical order of Franciscans based in Pasadena, California, with vowed members in California, Arizona and New Mexico. CFARI members live among the populations they serve and are self supporting in their ministry.

== Distinguishing characteristics ==
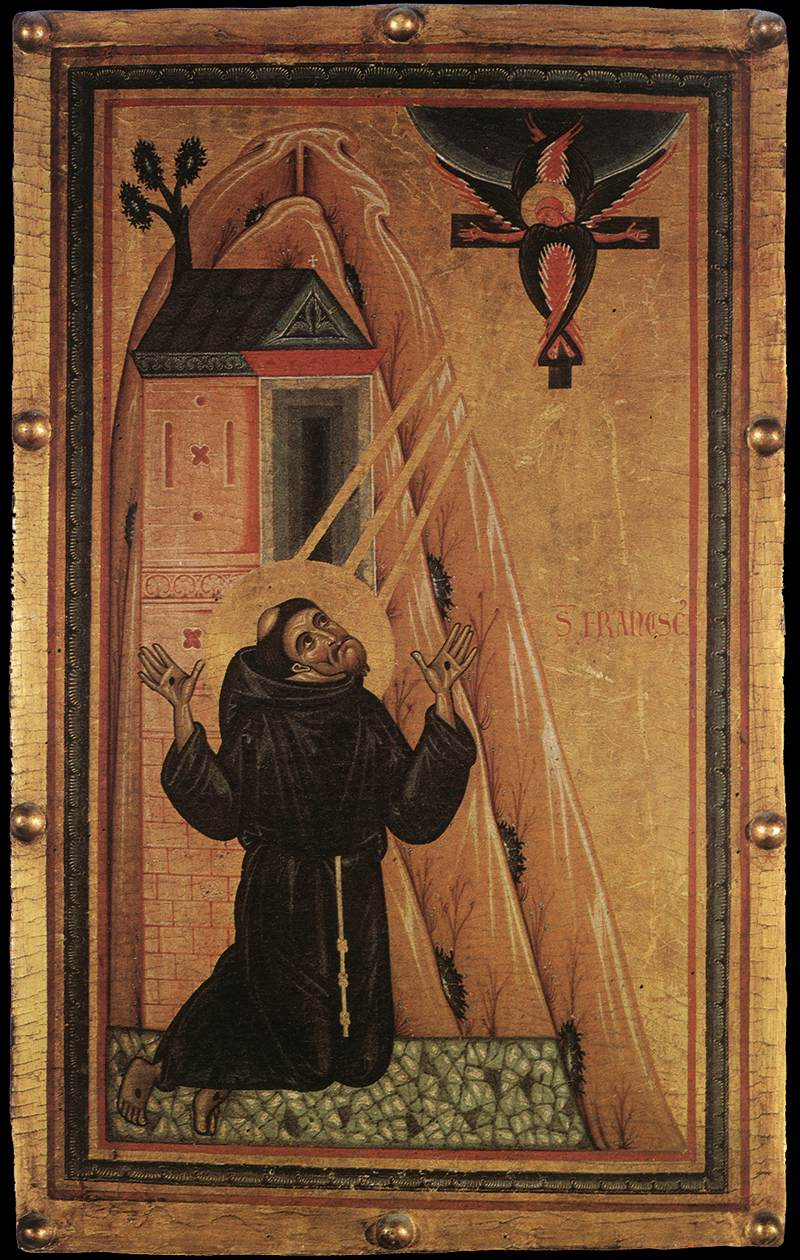
The stigmatization of St. Francis

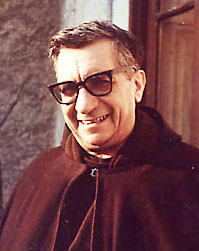
Gabriele Allegra (1907–1976) of the Studium Biblicum Franciscanum

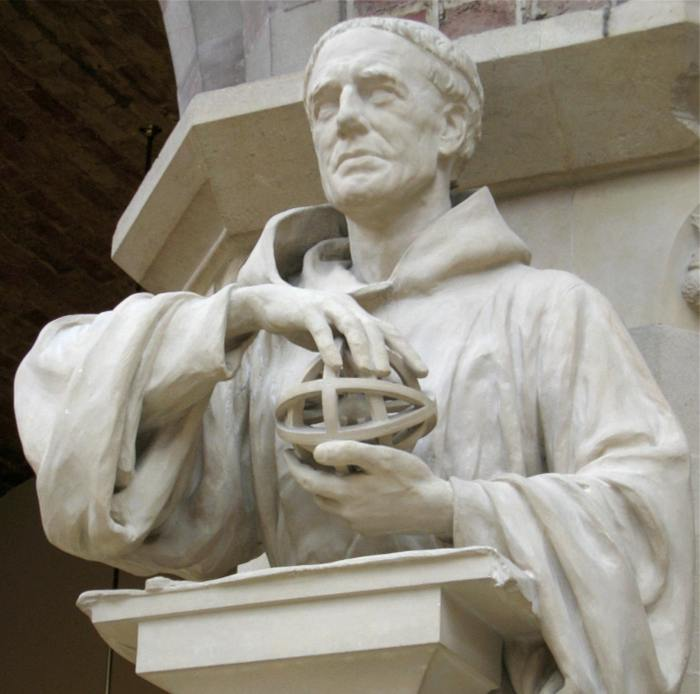
Roger Bacon (c. 1214–1294), statue from the 19th century in the Oxford University Museum of Natural History

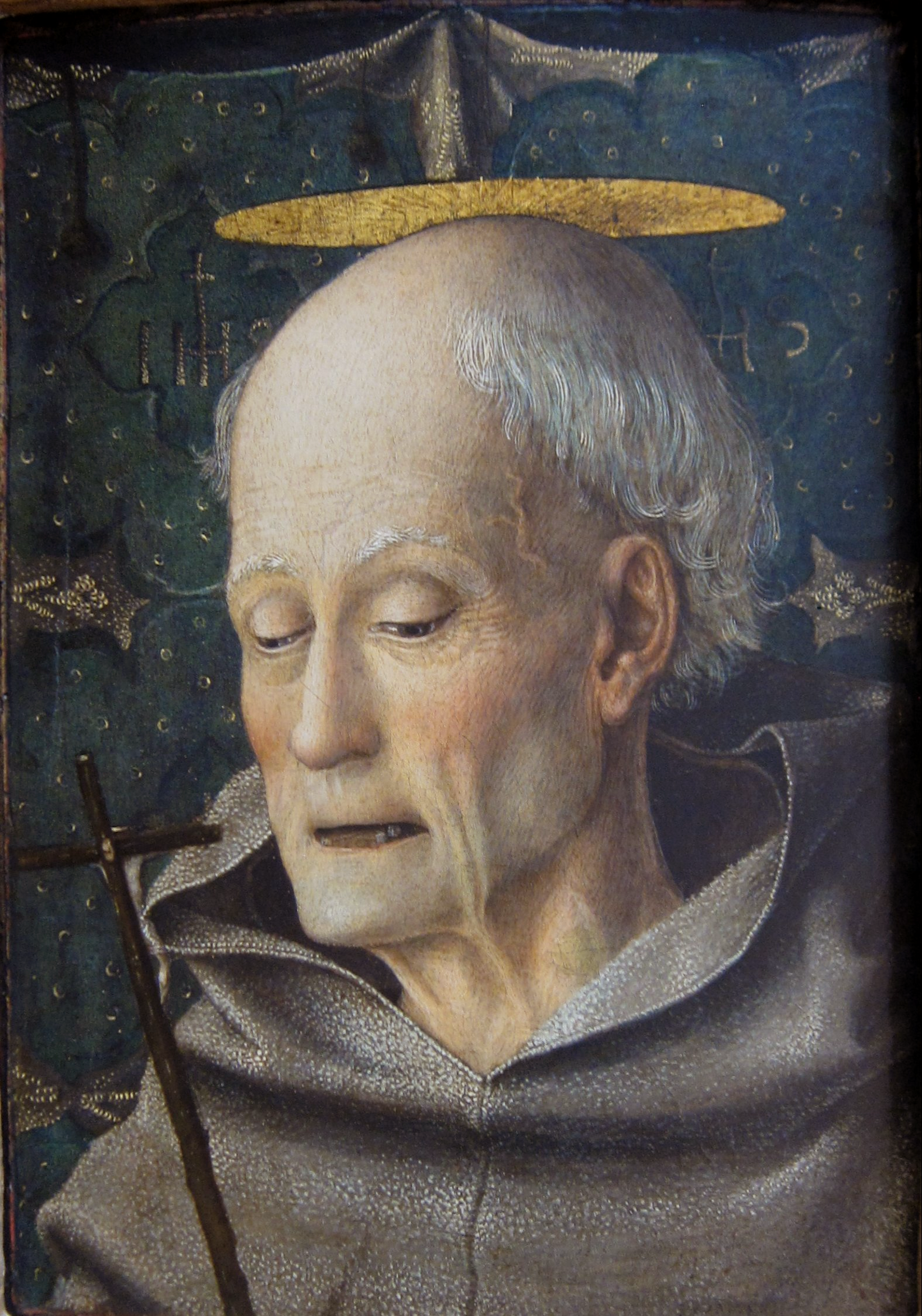
Bernardino of Siena (1380–1440), painted by Jacopo Bellini (c. 1400–1470)

=== Spirituality ===
Franciscan theology conforms to broader doctrine with the Catholic Church, but involves several unique emphases. Franciscan theologians view creation, the natural world, as good and joyous, and avoid dwelling on the "stain of original sin." Francis expressed great affection towards animals and inanimate natural objects as fellow inhabitants of God's creation, in his work Canticle of the Creatures (Laudes Creaturarum, also known as the Canticle of the Sun).

Special emphasis is put on the Incarnation of Christ viewed as a special act of humility, as Francis was struck by God's great charity in sacrificing his son for the salvation of mankind. They also exhibit great devotion to the Eucharist. The Rule of Saint Francis calls for members to practice simple living and detachment from material possessions in emulation of Jesus' life and earthly ministry. The simple lifestyle helps members of the order, in whichever branch, to experience solidarity with the poor and to work for social justice. Franciscan spirituality also strongly emphasizes working to preserve the church, and remain loyal to it.

=== Visions and stigmata ===
Among Catholic religious, Franciscans have proportionally reported higher ratios of stigmata and have claimed proportionally higher ratios of visions of Jesus and Mary. Francis of Assisi himself was one of the first reported cases of stigmata, and perhaps the most famous stigmatic of modern times is Padre Pio, a Capuchin, who also reported visions of Jesus and Mary. Pio's stigmata persisted for over fifty years and he was examined by numerous physicians in the 20th century, who confirmed the existence of the wounds, but none of whom could produce a medical explanation for the fact that his bleeding wounds would never get infected. According to the Encyclopaedia Britannica, his wounds healed once, but reappeared.

Some medical authorities who examined Padre Pio's wounds were inclined to believe that the stigmata were connected with nervous or cataleptic hysteria. The wounds were first examined by Luigi Romanelli, chief physician of the City Hospital of Barletta, in 1919. Giorgio Festa, a private practitioner examined them in 1920 and 1925. Giuseppe Bastianelli, a physician to Pope Benedict XV, agreed that the wounds existed but made no other comment. Pathologist Amico Bignami also observed the wounds.

=== Contributions to biblical scholarship ===
The Franciscans established the Studium Biblicum Franciscanum as an academic society based in Jerusalem and Hong Kong for the study of scripture. The Hong Kong branch founded by Gabriele Allegra produced the first complete translation of the Catholic Bible in Chinese in 1968 after a 40-year effort. The Studium Biblicum Translation is often considered the authoritative Chinese Bible among Catholics.

The early efforts of another Franciscan, namely Giovanni di Monte Corvino who had attempted a first translation of the Bible in Beijing in the 14th century, provided the initial spark for Gabriele Allegra's 40 year undertaking, when at the age of 21 he happened to attend the 6th centenary celebration for Monte Corvino.

=== Notable members ===
The Franciscan order boasts a number of distinguished members. From its first century can be cited the three great scholastics Alexander of Hales, Bonaventure, and John Duns Scotus, the "Doctor of Wonders" Roger Bacon, and the well-known mystic authors and popular preachers David of Augsburg and Berthold of Regensburg.

During the Middle Ages noteworthy members included Nicholas of Lyra, Biblical commentator Bernardino of Siena, philosopher William of Ockham, preachers John of Capistrano, Oliver Maillard, and Michel Menot, and historians Luke Wadding and Antoine Pagi.

In the field of Christian art during the later Middle Ages, the Franciscan movement exercised considerable influence, especially in Italy. The influence of Franciscan ideals shows in several great painters of the 13th and 14th centuries, especially Cimabue and Giotto, who, though they were not friars, were spiritual sons of Francis in the wider sense. It is also seen in the plastic masterpieces of Giotto, as well as the architectural conceptions of both himself and his school. The Italian Gothic style, whose earliest important monument is the great convent church at Assisi, built 1228–1253, was cultivated as a rule principally by members of the order or men under their influence.

The early spiritual poetry of Italy was partially inspired by Francis himself, who was followed by Thomas of Celano, Bonaventure, and Jacopone da Todi. Through a tradition which held him to have been a member of the Franciscan Third Order, even Dante may be included within this artistic tradition, cf. especially Paradiso, xi. 50.

Other famous members of the Franciscan family include Anthony of Padua, François Rabelais, Alexander of Hales, Giovanni da Pian del Carpini, Pio of Pietrelcina, Maximilian Kolbe, Pasquale Sarullo, Mamerto Esquiú, Gabriele Allegra, Junipero Serra, Simpliciano of the Nativity, Mychal F. Judge, Angelico Chavez, Anton Docher, Joseph of Cupertino, Benedict Groeschel and Leonard of Port Maurice.

During the "spiritual conquest" of New Spain, 1523–1572, the arrival of the first group of Franciscans, the Twelve Apostles of Mexico, included Martín de Valencia, but more prominently for his corpus of writings on the earliest years was Toribio de Benavente Motolinia. Other important Franciscans are Alonso de Molina, Andrés de Olmos, and Bernardino de Sahagún, who all created texts in indigenous language of Nahuatl to aid friars in the evangelization of Mexico. Geronimo de Mendieta, Augustin de Vetancourt, and Juan de Torquemada are important contributors to the history of the Franciscans in central Mexico.

A modern notable member is Casey Cole, an American Franciscan friar, Catholic priest, writer, and blogger. Cole runs his own online blog and YouTube channel called Breaking in the Habit and is the author of the books Let Go: Seven Stumbling Blocks to Christian Discipleship and Called: What Happens After Saying Yes to God.

== Publications ==
The UK Franciscan Order manages the website https://www.franciscanpublishing.com/about-us/. Previously, the Franciscan International Study Centre was established in Canterbury in 1973 and closed its doors in 2017.

== See also ==
- Alonso de Posada (1626–?) Spanish missionary in New Mexico
- Association of Franciscan Colleges and Universities
- List of ministers general of the Order of Friars Minor
- Maria Antonio of Vicenza
- List of Franciscan saints
- Francis of Assisi The founder of Franciscans
- Supply of Franciscan missions in New Mexico
- Tomás Manso (1604–1659) Spanish missionary in New Mexico
