= Haymo of Faversham =

English Franciscan scholar

Haymo of Faversham O.F.M. (d. c. 1243) was an English Franciscan scholar. His scholastic epithet was Inter Aristotelicos Aristotelicissimus (Latin for "Most Aristotelian among the Aristotelians"), referring to his stature among the Scholastics during the Recovery of Aristotle amid the 12th- and 13th-century Renaissance. He acquired fame as a lecturer at the University of Paris and also as a preacher when he entered the Order of Friars Minor, probably in 1224 or 1225. He served as the Minister Provincial for England (1239–1240) and as the Minister General of the Order (1240–c. 1243).

== Life ==
Haymo was born in Faversham, Kent. Thomas of Ecclestone tells us that he entered after having a vision of himself praying in the church in Faversham before the crucifix. A cord was lowered from heaven and he was drawn up to heaven by it. When Haymo saw the Friars Minor he recognised the cord and, after having asked the advice of the Dominican Master General Jordan of Saxony, Haymo and three others entered the Friars Minor at St. Denis, just outside Paris, on Good Friday after having preached the Good Friday sermon.

Shortly after this he was appointed custos at Paris, in which capacity he seems to have attended the general chapter of the order at Assisi in 1230, and was one of the deputies sent by the chapter to Pope Gregory IX to petition for an explanation of certain points in the rule about which there had arisen some discussion in the order. The pope replied with the celebrated Bull "Quo elongati" of 28 September 1230. After this chapter Haymo probably went to England, for from a mention of him in the Patent Rolls Henrici III" he seems to have been at Oxford in 1232, probably as a lecturer in the Franciscan school there. In 1233 he was one of the Friars Minor sent by the Holy See to Constantinople to negotiate for the reunion of the Latin and Greek Churches.

He led a peculiarly active life, for during these years he not only lectured at Oxford, but also at Tours, Bologna, and Padua. He was, moreover, employed by Gregory IX in revising the Breviary of the Roman Curia, and the edition published in 1241 of this Breviary (which afterwards was ordered to be used in all the Roman churches and eventually, with some modification, became the Breviary of the whole Catholic Church) was chiefly the work of Haymo (cf. trans. of Pierre Batiffol, "Hist. of the Roman Breviary", p. 213). In 1239 he took part in the general chapter of the order held at Rome when the notorious Elias of Cortona was deposed from the office of general. From Thomas of Eccleston's account of this chapter it appears that Haymo was one of the chief spokesmen against Elias. He also brought about the degradation of Gregory of Naples, a lieutenant of Elias and a nephew of the pope. After the deposition of Elias, Albert of Pisa, Provincial of England, was elected general, and Haymo succeeded him in the English provincialate. Albert, however died during the first year of his generalate, and Haymo was then elected to the supreme office in the order. According to Luke Wadding, Haymo was elected general in 1239, but this is an evident error. Eccleston expressly says that Haymo, while Provincial of England, gave the habit of the order to Ralph of Maidstone, Bishop of Hereford; but Ralph only resigned his bishopric on 17 December 1239; Haymo, therefore, could not have been elected general of the order until 1240.

While Minister Provincial for England, he reversed the work of the earlier ministers who had kept the order humbly equipped and situated. Instead, he began to enlarge the Order's lands—particularly around Oxford's College of the Franciscans outside the old wall's Watergate—so that the friars would be able to work for their own sustenance instead of depending on charity.

Haymo at once set about rectifying the disorders caused among the friars by Elias. The latter had increased the number of provinces in the order to seventy-two, "after the manner of the seventy-two disciples", says Eccleston, and because he wished to rival the Dominicans, who had divided their order into twelve provinces in honor of the twelve Apostles. Haymo reduced the number of provinces. As Elias had found his chief supporters amongst the lay brothers, whom he had attached to his person by promoting them to high places, Haymo decreed that in future no lay brother should be appointed superior except when there were no priests to fill the office. He also defined the rights of superiors, and set their jurisdiction within definite bounds. Although very zealous for the poverty of the rule, he yet was aware of the disadvantages of depending too much on alms, preferring that the friars live by their own labours. Thus, when Provincial of England, he obtained several larger grounds for the friars, so they could cultivate land. That way, they could supply themselves with food, and not have to beg.

He died at Anagni in Italy c. 1243. On his death-bed, says Eccleston, he was visited by Pope Innocent IV; but Innocent IV was at Anagni only from 25 June until the middle of October 1243, and during the whole of 1244 was resident at Rome. Haymo's epitaph runs:

Hic jacet Anglorum summum decus, Haymo, Minorum,
Vivendo frater, hosque regendo pater:
Eximius lector, generalis in ordine rector.

"Here lies Haymo, highest glory of the English; in his living a brother [friar] of the Minors, in ruling them a father; an eminent lecturer, and rector general in his order." As a schoolman he was styled, in the fashion of the time, Speculum honestatis. Besides his lectures on the Sentences he left a treatise on the ceremonies of the Mass and a book of sermons.

Preceded by Albert of Pisa	Minister General of the Order of Friars Minor; 1240–1243	Succeeded by Crescentius of Jesi
