= Bernard of Quintavalle =

Blessed Bernard of Quintavalle OFM
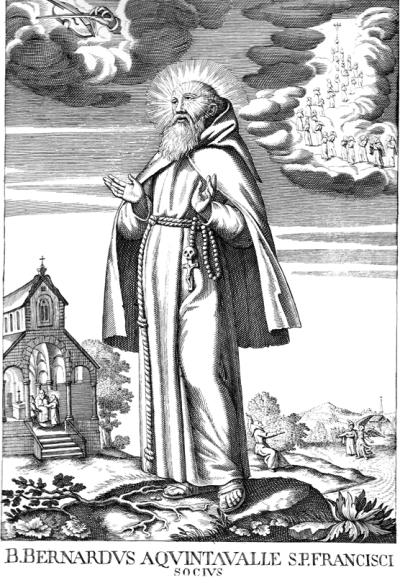

Religious
- Born: Assisi, Duchy of Spoleto, Holy Roman Empire
- Died: 10 July 1241; Assisi, Umbria, Papal States
- Venerated in: Roman Catholic Church
- Feast: 10 July

Bernard of Quintavalle (died 1241) was the first disciple of St. Francis of Assisi. Bernard was declared as the Minorum Ordinis prima plantula, the "First fruits of the Minor Orders". He accompanied Francis on a number of missionary journeys and served as Minister Provincial in Spain.

== Life ==
Bernard, son of Quintavalle, son of Berardello, was a well-to-do young noble from Assisi. He received his JUD at the Bologna University. His family's house still stands in Assisi to this day.

Bernard received his evangelical calling in the spring of 1208, when he and Francis had recourse to the Sortes Sanctorum in the church of San Nicolò. After hearing Mass, and praying until terce,

...the priest, at the request of St. Francis, took the missal, and having made the sign of the most holy cross, opened it three times in the name of our Lord Jesus Christ. At the first opening, they found that saying which Christ spake in the Gospel to the young man which inquired the way of perfection: 'If thou wilt be perfect, go and sell that thou hast, and give to the poor and follow Me'. At the second opening, they found that saying which Christ spake to the Apostles, when He sent them forth to preach: 'Take nothing for your journey, neither staff, nor scrip, nor shoes, nor money'; intending thereby to teach them that they ought to set all their hope of living upon God, and to turn all their thoughts to preaching the Holy Gospel. At the third opening of the missal they found that saying which Christ spake: 'If any man will come after Me, let him deny himself and take up his cross and follow Me'.

Bernard sold all that he had and went to the Square of St. George, where assisted by Francis, he gave everything to widows, to orphans, to prisoners, to monasteries, to hospitals and to pilgrims.

In 1211, Francis tasked Bernard with preaching to the worldly and wealthy residents of Bologna. Upon first entering Bologna, because of his appearance, he was mocked and abused as a thief or deserter; but after showing Francis' Rule to the local magistrate, the people's attitude changed. Bernard subsequently asked Francis to send someone to replace him at Bologna lest he be tempted to pride due to the honor and respect shown to him. Francis then sent Bernard to Lombardy. He was then sent to Florence.

After the family of St Clare tried to forcibly remove her from the Benedictine convent of San Paulo near Bastia, Bernard accompanied her the Benedictine nuns of the convent of Convento di Sant'Angelo di Panzo. In 1213, he accompanied Francis on a missionary journey through Spain, but Francis directed Bernard to remain behind at one point to tend to a poor invalid. When they met again a year later, the sick man had recovered, and Francis and Bernard continued through Aragon and Catalonia, Roussillon to Montpellier, and through Piedmont back to his chapel at Santa Maria dei Angeli in Assisi.

He subsequently became Minister Provincial in Spain until 1219, when he was succeeded by John Parenti.

Together with Angelo Tancredi, and Leo of Assisi, Bernard remained close to Francis, especially during the last two years of Francis' life. St Francis imparted a special blessing to him, although Thomas of Celano reserves this blessing for Elias.

After the death of Francis, Bernard had occasion to take to task the Vicar General Elias for riding in a large horse-drawn coach, which to Bernard was not in accord with the Rule.

Bernard died around 1241 and is buried close to the tomb of St Francis in the Basilica of St Francis in Assisi.
