= Brother Leo =

Disciple of Francis of Assisi

Blessed Brother Leo OFM
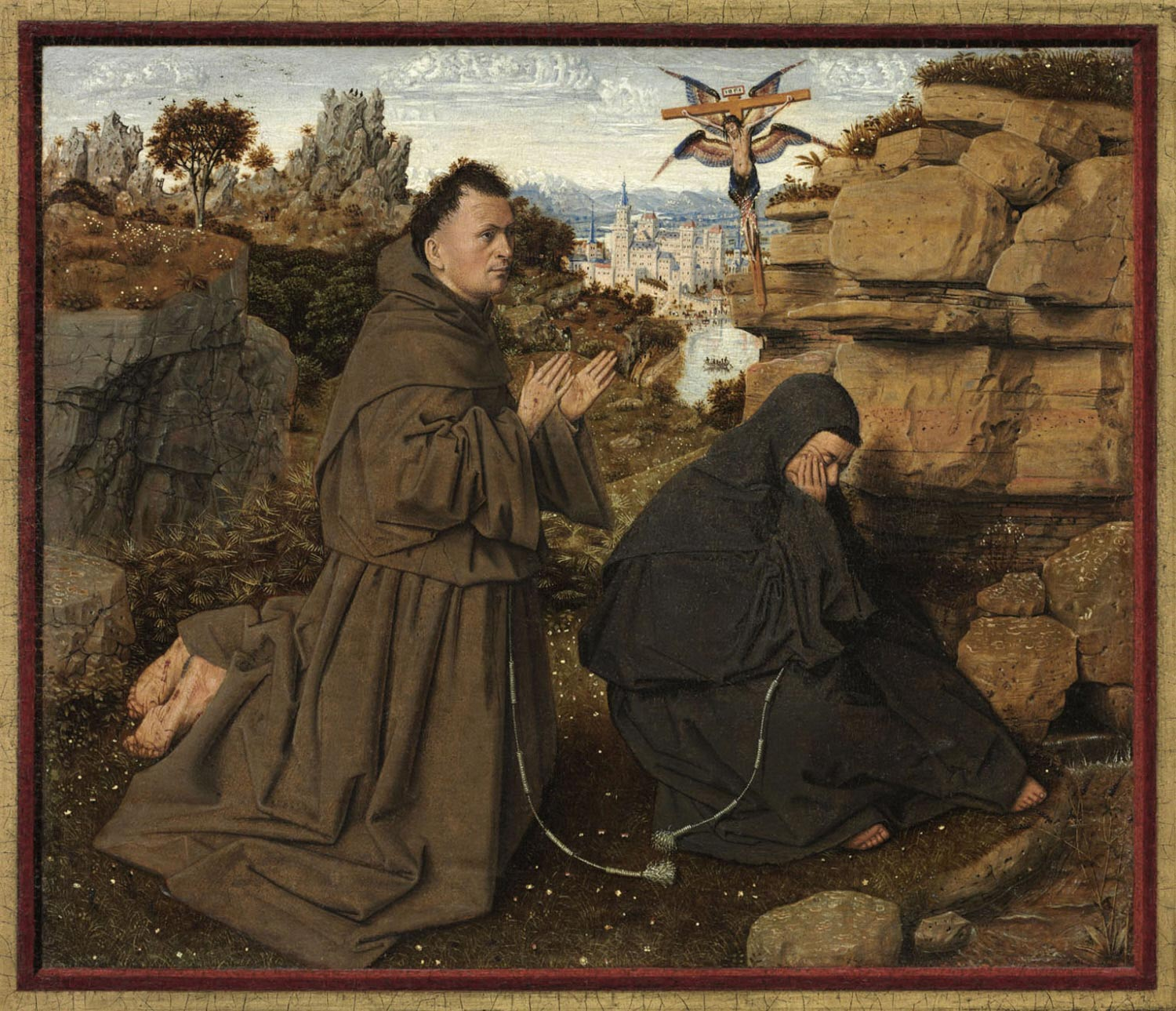
- Saint Francis of Assisi Receiving the Stigmata, attributed to Jan van Eyck, c. 1430–32, Philadelphia Museum of Art. Brother Leo crouches to our right.

Religious
- Died: 15 November 1271; Portiuncula, Assisi, Umbria, Papal States
- Venerated in: Roman Catholicism
- Feast: 15 November

Brother Leo (died 15 November 1271) was the favorite disciple, secretary and confessor of Francis of Assisi. The dates of his birth and of his becoming a Franciscan are not known; a native of Assisi, he was one of the small group of most trusted companions of the saint during his last years.

== Life ==
Although not one of the original twelve companions of Francis, Leo was one of the first to join him after the approbation of the first Rule of the Friars Minor (1209–1210) and perhaps was already a priest. In the course of time he became Francis's confessor and secretary, and from about 1220 up to the time of Francis's death Leo was his constant companion. He was with Francis when the latter retired to Fonte Colombo near Rieti in 1223 to re-write the rule of the order, and he accompanied him on his subsequent journey to Rome to seek its approval. The year following, Leo was present on Mount La Verna when Francis received the stigmata. Francis called him "Frate Pecorello di Dio" because of Leo's simplicity and tenderness. Leo nursed Francis during his last illness.

Soon after Francis's death, Leo came into conflict with those whom he considered traitors to Francis and his ideal of poverty, especially Elias of Cortona. He protested against the collection of money for the erection of the Basilica of San Francesco, and broke in pieces the marble box which Elias had set up for offertories for the completion of the basilica at Assisi. For this Elias had him scourged, an unpopular move which consolidated the opposition to Elias.

Leo thereupon retired to a hermitage of the order. He assisted at the deathbed of Clare of Assisi in 1253. After suffering many persecutions from the dominant party in the order, he died at the Porziuncola in extreme old age, and his remains are buried in the Basilica of St. Francis.

Much that is known concerning him is collected by Paul Sabatier in the "Introduction" to the Speculum perfectionis (The Mirror of Perfection). It was likely compiled after his death based on stories that he told and on his writings.

== In literature ==
Leo figures prominently in Nikos Kazantzakis' book Saint Francis, or God's Little Pauper. In this book, Leo is portrayed as Francis' constant companion. Leo is utterly faithful and steadfast, and yet struggles with his own shortcomings while following Francis.
