= Thomas of Eccleston =

English Franciscan chronicler

Thomas of Eccleston was a thirteenth-century English Franciscan chronicler. He is known for De Adventu Fratrum Minorum in Angliam. It runs from 1224, when Franciscan friars first came to England, under Agnellus of Pisa, to about 1258. He styles himself simply "Brother Thomas" and John Bale seems to have first given him the title "of Eccleston".

== Life ==
He entered the Order of Friars Minor in about 1232 or 1233 and was a student at Oxford between 1230 and 1240. After 1240, he was at the London monastery, though he held no office there.

== The chronicle ==
The De Adventu is a collection of notes rather than a finished work. Incidentally it throws some light on the trend of early Franciscan events and thought in general.

For a period of twenty-six years, Eccleston was busy collecting material for his chronicle, which he based on personal knowledge, interviews, and documents no longer extant. He described the “heroic period” of the Franciscan movement in England. His chronicle lacks dates, is weak on chronological presentation, and gives preference to England, but is considered accurate and reliable in the content related to the Friars Minor in England.

== Editions ==
Though the original manuscript has been lost, there are four manuscripts of the “De Adventu” which are known to scholars. The chronicle was edited in the nineteenth century by J. S. Brewer in the “Monumenta Franciscana” (1858), by R. Howlett (1882), by the Friar Minors at Quaracchi (1885), and by Felix Lieberman in the “Monumenta Germaniae” (1885). A critical edition is lacking. Father Cuthbert, O.S.F.C., translated the work into English in 1903 under the title The Friars and How They Came to England, and E. Gurney Salter rendered it in English in 1926 with the title The Coming of the Friars Minor to England and Germany.
