= Minister general (Franciscan) =

Official in the Order of Friars Minor

Minister general is the term used for the head or superior general of the different branches of the Order of Friars Minor. It is a term exclusive to the order and comes directly from its founder, St. Francis of Assisi.

== Terminology ==
Francis chose the word "minister" over "superior" out of his vision that the brothers of the Order were all to be equal, and that the friar supervising his brothers was to be a servant ("minister") who cared for (ministered to) them, not one who lorded over them. The original term is minister generalis in Latin and is found in Chapter 8 of the Rule of Saint Francis. In his lifetime, Francis actively employed the term "minister" to refer to the heads of the various communities of friars who by then were already scattered around Europe.

The term is sometimes written as "general minister", but "minister general" is the official form in the English language, in keeping with other official titles.

== Third Order ==
In the 20th century, the term also came to be used as well by many religious congregations of the Third Order of St. Francis, in the effort to follow more closely the spirit of the founder of their Order.

== See also ==
- List of ministers general of the Order of Friars Minor
