= Order of Friars Minor =

Mendicant Catholic religious order

- Ordo Fratrum Minorum (Latin)
- Coat of arms of the Order of Friars Minor
- Abbreviation: OFM
- Predecessor: Order of Observant Friars Minor
- Merged into: On 4 October 1897, the Order of Discalced Friars Minor, Order of Observant Friars Minor, Order of Friars Minor Recollect, the Order of Reformed Friars Minor, et al., were merged into a single religious order named the Order of Friars Minor
- Formation: 24 February 1209; 817 years ago
- Founder: Francis of Assisi
- Founded at: Assisi, Italy
- Type: Mendicant Order Institute of Consecrated Life – Men
- Legal status: Religious institute
- Headquarters: General Curia; Via di S. Maria Mediatrice, 2500165 Roma, Italia
- Members: 12,726 (8,771 priests) (2020)
- Minister General: Massimo Fusarelli
- Motto: Latin: Pax et bonum English: Peace and the good
- Ministry: Preaching, missionary, educational, parochial, charitable works
- Parent organization: Catholic Church
- Subsidiaries: Secular Franciscan Order (1221); Third Order of Saint Francis (1447)
- Secessions: Order of Friars Minor Conventual (1209); Order of Friars Minor Capuchin (1520)
- Website: ofm.org
- Formerly called: Order of Observant Friars Minor

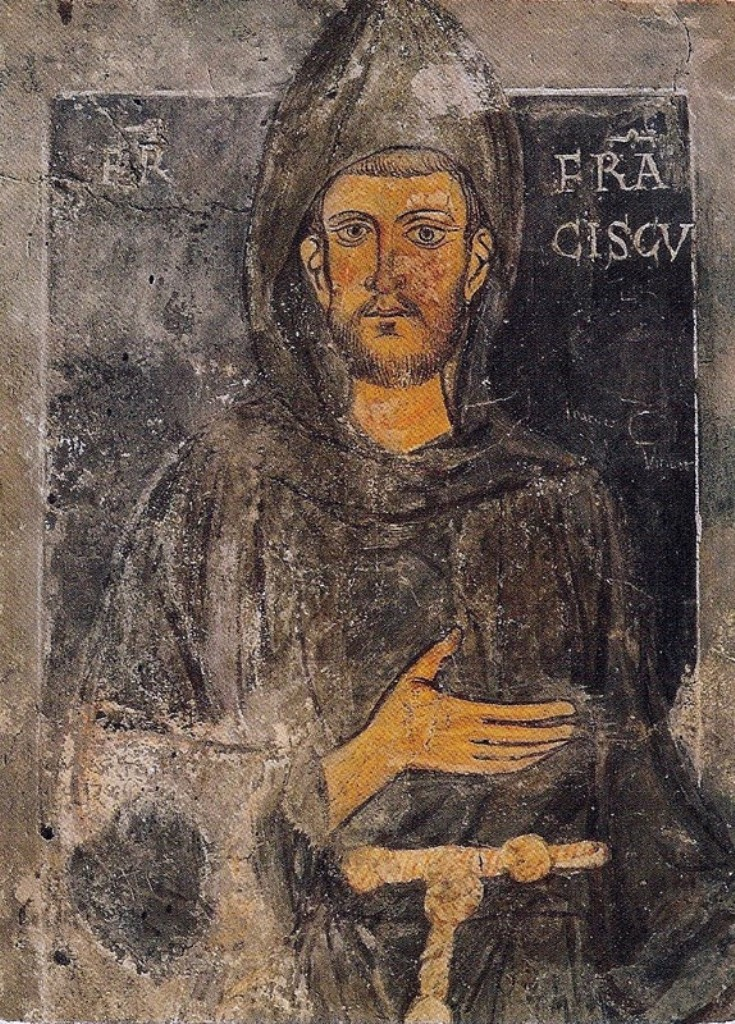
Francis of Assisi, founder of the Order of Friars Minor; oldest known portrait in existence of the saint, dating back to St. Francis' retreat to Subiaco (1223–1224)

The Order of Friars Minor (commonly called the Franciscans, the Franciscan Order, or the Seraphic Order; postnominal abbreviation OFM) is a mendicant Catholic religious order, founded in 1209 by Francis of Assisi. The order adheres to the teachings and spiritual disciplines of the founder and of his main associates and followers, such as Clare of Assisi, Anthony of Padua, and Elizabeth of Hungary, among many others. The Order of Friars Minor is the largest of the contemporary First Orders within the Franciscan movement.

Francis began preaching around 1207 and traveled to Rome to seek approval of his order from Pope Innocent III in 1209. The original Rule of Saint Francis approved by the pope disallowed ownership of property, requiring members of the order to beg for food while preaching. The austerity was meant to emulate the life and ministry of Jesus Christ. Franciscans traveled and preached in the streets, while boarding in church properties. The extreme poverty required of members was relaxed in the final revision of the Rule in 1223. The degree of observance required of members remained a major source of conflict within the order, resulting in numerous secessions.

The Order of Friars Minor, previously known as the Observant branch (postnominal abbreviation OFM Obs.), is one of the three Franciscan First Orders within the Catholic Church, the others being the Capuchins (OFM Cap.) and Conventuals (OFM Conv.). The Order of Friars Minor, in its current form, is the result of an amalgamation of several smaller Franciscan orders (e.g., the Alcantarines, Recollects, Reformanti, etc.), completed in 1897 by Pope Leo XIII. The Capuchins and Conventuals remain distinct religious institutes within the Catholic Church, observing the Rule of Saint Francis with different emphases. Franciscans are sometimes referred to as Minorites or Greyfriars, the latter because of their original habit. In Poland and Lithuania they are known as Bernardines, after Bernardino of Siena.

== Name and demographics ==
The "Order of Friars Minor" are commonly called simply the "Franciscans". This Order is a mendicant religious order of men that traces its origin to Francis of Assisi. Their official Latin name is the Ordo Fratrum Minorum ("Order of Lesser Brothers"). Francis gave this name to his brotherhood. Having been born among the lower classes (minores) (serfs, second class citizens), before his conversion, he aspired to move up the social ladder to the maiores (nobles, first class citizens). After a life of conversion, the name of his brotherhood indicates his coming to an appreciation of his social condition on behalf of those who have no class or citizenship in society.

The modern organization of the Friars Minor comprises several separate families or groups, each considered a religious order in its own right under its own Minister General and particular type of governance. They all live according to a body of regulations known as the Rule of St Francis. These are:

Group	Official name	Numbers according to the 2013 Annuario Pontificio		
Group	Official name	Communities	Members	Priests
The Order of Friars Minor, known as the "Observants", most commonly simply called Franciscan friars	"Friars Minor" (OFM)	2,212	14,123	9,735
The Order of Friars Minor Capuchin or simply Capuchins	"Friars Minor Capuchin" (OFM Cap)	1,633	10,786	7,057
The Conventual Franciscans or Minorites	"Friars Minor Conventual" (OFM Conv)	667	4,289	2,921

== History ==
=== Beginnings ===
A sermon on Mt 10:9 which Francis heard in 1209 made such an impression on him that he decided to fully devote himself to a life of apostolic poverty. Clad in a rough garment, barefoot, and, after the Evangelical precept, without staff or scrip, he began to preach repentance.

The mendicant orders had long been exempt from the jurisdiction of the bishop, and enjoyed (as distinguished from the secular clergy) unrestricted freedom to preach and hear confessions in the churches connected with their monasteries. This had led to endless friction and open quarrels between the two divisions of the clergy. This question was definitively settled by the Council of Trent.

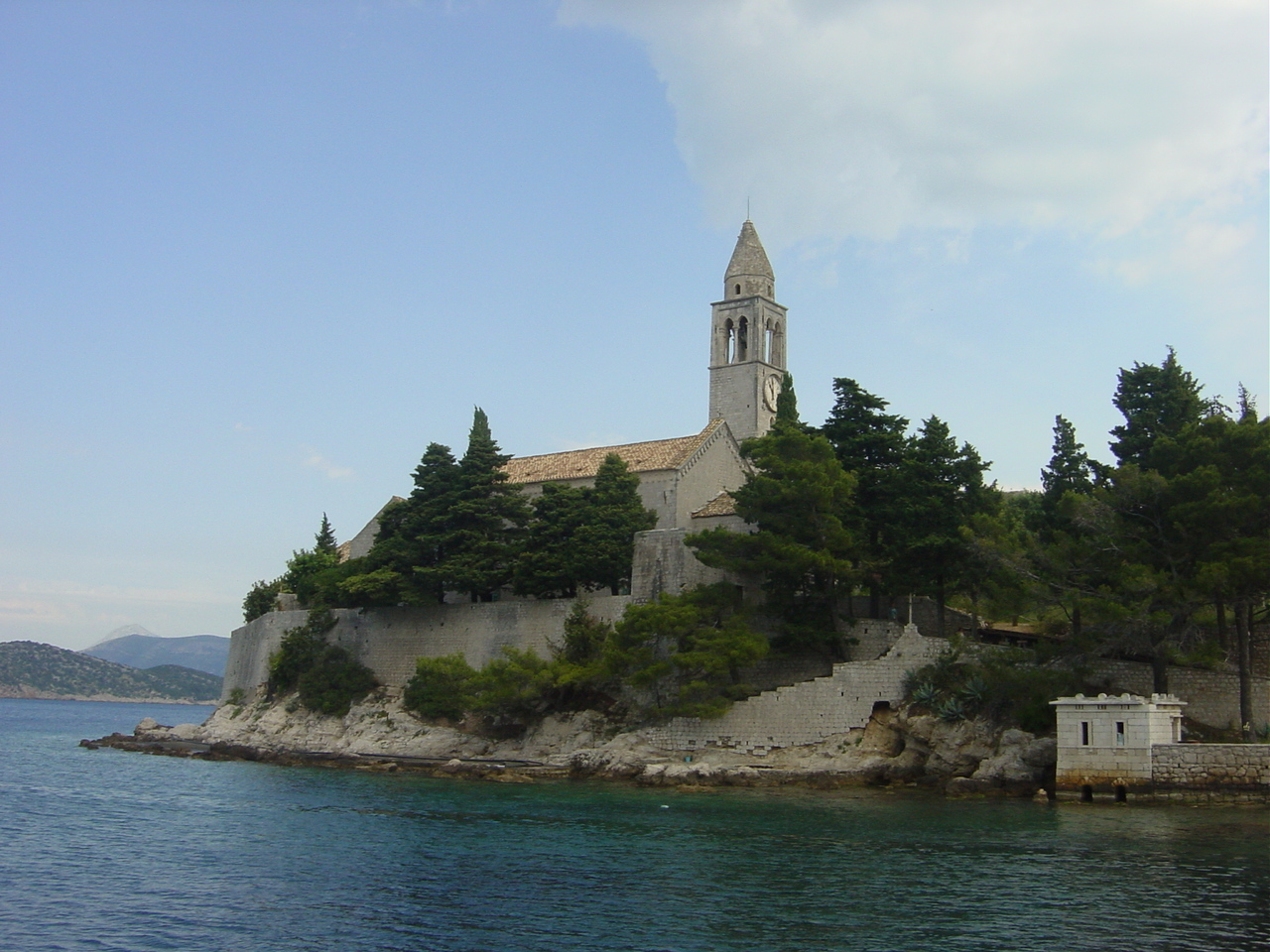
Franciscan convent at Lopud in Croatia

=== Separate congregations ===
Amid numerous dissensions in the 14th century, a number of separate observances sprang up, almost like sects (to say nothing of the heretical parties of the Beghards and Fraticelli), some of which developed within the order on both hermit and cenobitic principles. They all operated generally under the authority of the Minister General of the Order, a member of the Observant branch, but were allowed their distinct practices. They included:

- The Clareni or Clarenini, an association of hermits established on the river Clareno in the march of Ancona by Angelo da Clareno after the suppression of the Franciscan Celestines by Boniface VIII. Like several other smaller congregations, it was obliged in 1568 under Pope Pius V to unite with the general body of Observantists.
- The quasi-Observantist brothers living under the rule of the Conventual ministers (Martinianists or "Observantes sub ministris"), such as the Colletans--formed under the guidance of Colette of Corbie and led by Boniface de Ceva in their reform attempts principally in France and Germany;
- The reformed congregation founded in 1426 by the Spaniard Philip de Berbegal and distinguished by the special importance they attached to the little hood (cappuciola);
- The Neutri, a group of reformers originating about 1463 in Italy, who tried to take a middle ground between the Conventuals and Observantists, but refused to obey the heads of either, until they were compelled by the pope to affiliate with the regular Observantists, or with those of the Common Life;
- The Caperolani, a congregation founded about 1470 in North Italy by Pietro Caperolo, but dissolved on the death of its founder in 1481;
- The Amadist friars, established by Amadeus of Portugal in 1472, the same year that he was selected to serve as the confessor to the pope. The Holy See entrusted him with the Church of San Pietro in Minotorio to serve as the motherhouse of his growing reform movement. They existed until 1568, when they were merged into the Observant branch of the Order.

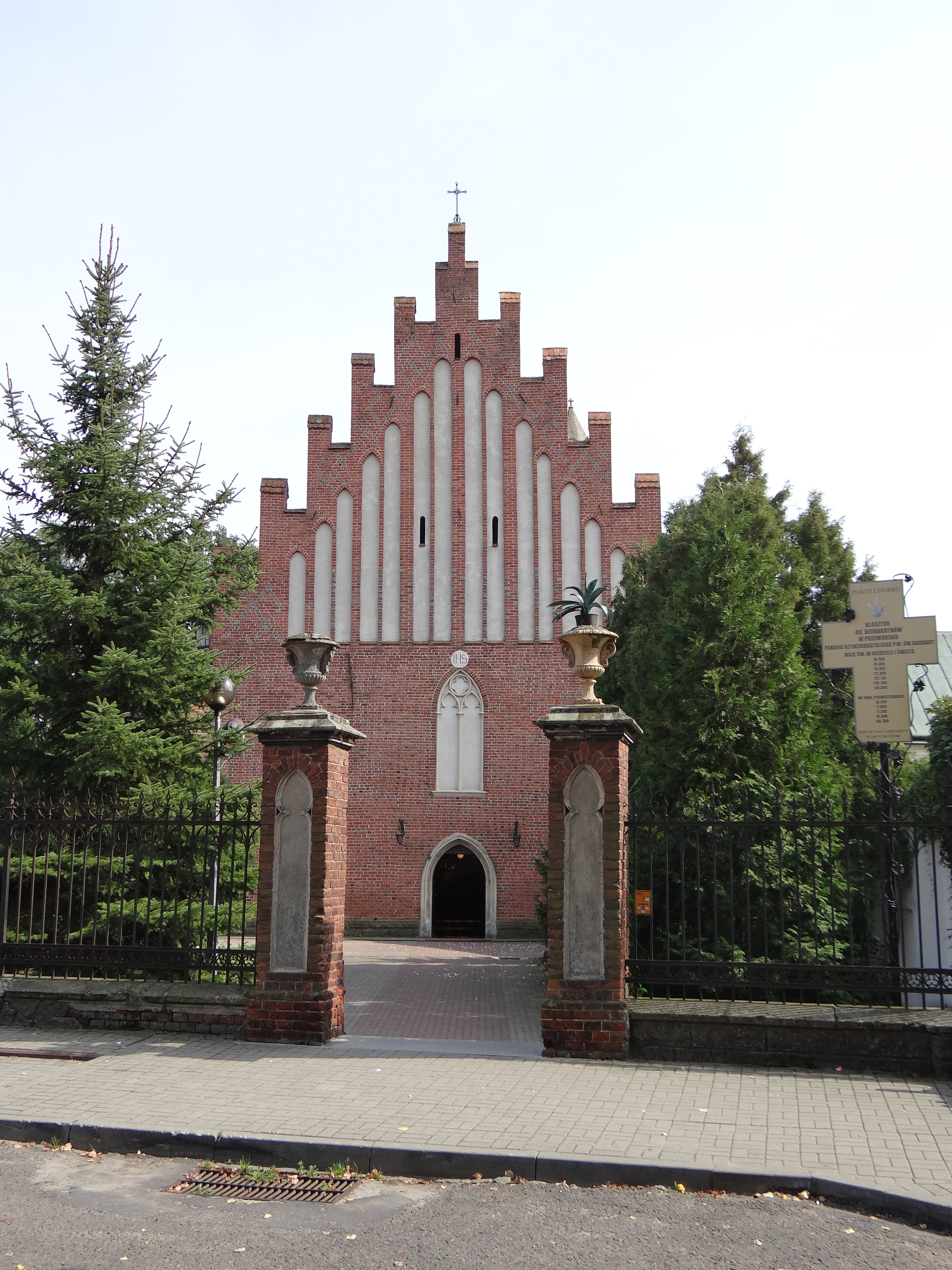
Franciscan Church from 15th century in Przeworsk, Poland

=== Rule on property ===
A difference of opinion developed in the community concerning the interpretation of the rule regarding property. The Observants held to a strict interpretation that the friars may not hold any property either individually nor communally. The literal and unconditional observance of this was rendered impracticable by the great expansion of the order, its pursuit of learning, and the accumulated property of the large cloisters in the towns. Regulations were drafted by which all alms donated were held by custodians appointed by the Holy See, who would make distributions upon request. It was John XXII who had introduced Conventualism in the sense of community of goods, income, and property as in other religious orders, in contradiction to Observantism or the strict observance of the rule. Pope Martin V, in the Brief Ad statum of 23 August 1430, allowed the Conventuals to hold property like all other orders.

=== Attempted union between branches ===
Projects for a union between the two main branches of the order were put forth not only by the Council of Constance but by several popes, without any positive result. By direction of Pope Martin V, John of Capistrano drew up statutes which were to serve as a basis for reunion, and they were actually accepted by a general chapter at Assisi in 1430; but the majority of the Conventual houses refused to agree to them, and they remained without effect.

Equally unsuccessful were the attempts of the Franciscan Pope Sixtus IV, who bestowed a vast number of privileges on both original mendicant orders, but by this very fact lost the favor of the Observants and failed in his plans for reunion. Julius II succeeded in doing away with some of the smaller branches, but left the division of the two great parties untouched. This division was finally legalized by Leo X, after a general chapter held in Rome in 1517, in connection with the reform movement of the Fifth Lateran Council, had once more declared the impossibility of reunion. Leo X summoned on 11 July 1516 a general chapter to meet at Rome on the feast of Pentecost 31 May 1517. This chapter suppressed all the reformed congregations and annexed them to the Observants; it then declared the Observants an independent order, and separated them completely from the Conventuals. The less strict principles of the Conventuals, permitting the possession of real estate and the enjoyment of fixed revenues, were recognized as tolerable, while the Observants, in contrast to this usus moderatus, were held strictly to their own usus arctus or pauper.

=== Unification ===
All of the groups that followed the Franciscan Rule literally were united to the Observants, and the right to elect the Minister General of the Order, together with the seal of the order, was given to the group united under the Observants. This grouping, since it adhered more closely to the rule of the founder, was allowed to claim a certain superiority over the Conventuals. The Observant general (elected now for six years, not for life) inherited the title of "Minister-General of the Whole Order of St. Francis" and was granted the right to confirm the choice of a head for the Conventuals, who was known as "Master-General of the Friars Minor Conventual"—although this privilege never became practically operative.

In 1875, the Kulturkampf expelled the majority of the German Franciscans, most of whom settled in North America.

== The habit and the French name Cordeliers ==
The habit has been gradually changed in colour and certain other details. Its colour, which was at first grey or a medium brown, is now a dark brown. The dress, which consists of a loose-sleeved gown, is confined by a white cord, from which is hung, since the fifteenth century, the Seraphic Rosary with its seven decades. Sandals are substituted for shoes. Around the neck and over the shoulders hangs the cowl.

The habit of referring to the Francisans as Cordeliers in France is said to date back to the Seventh Crusade, when Louis IX asked who the particularly zealous monks pursuing Saracens were, and was told they were "de cordes liés". Upon the crusaders' return to France, the name became part of the language.

== Notable friars ==
=== Saints and Beati ===
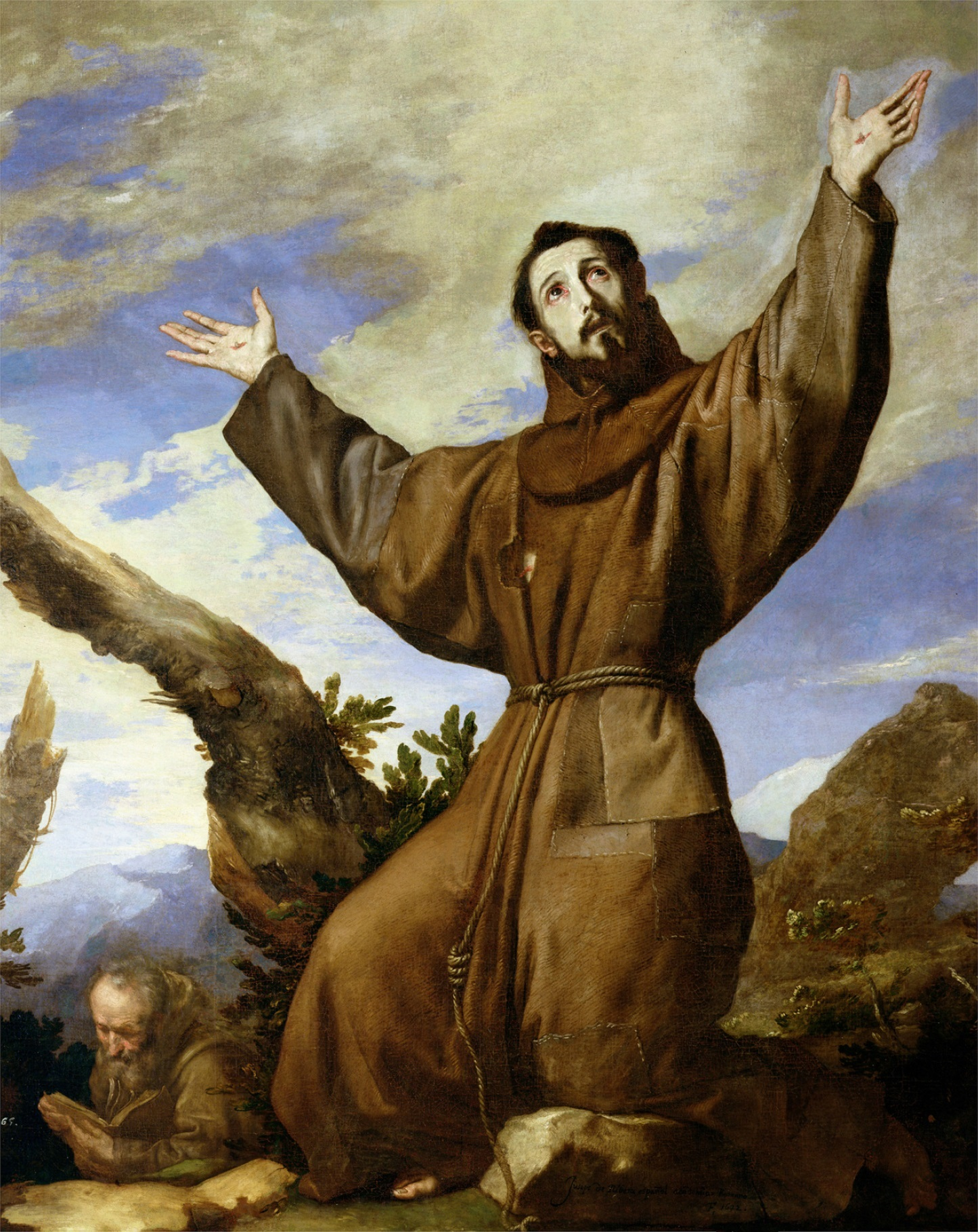
Francis of Assisi, the Seraphic Father

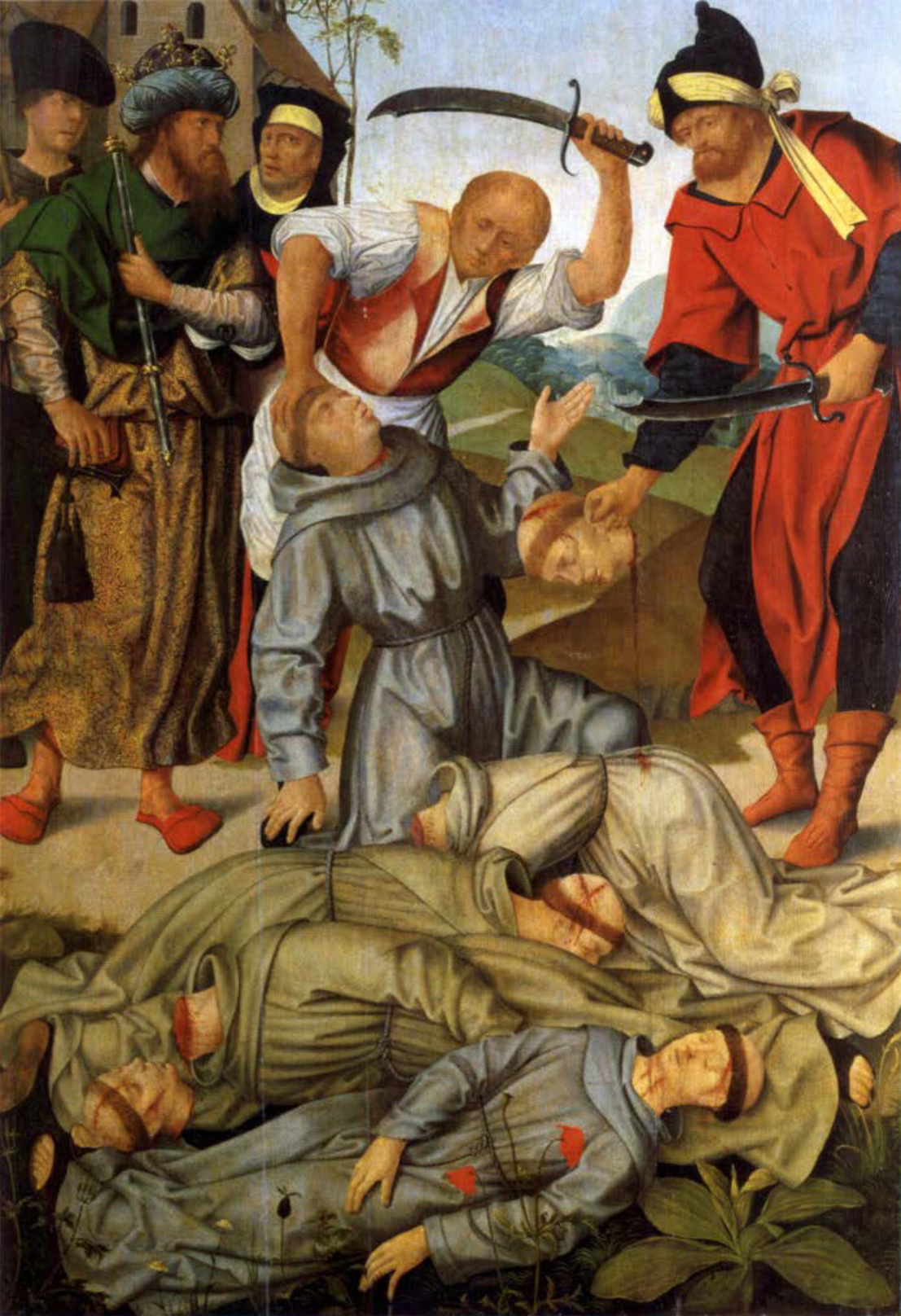
Berard of Carbio and his four companions, the Seraphic Protomartyrs

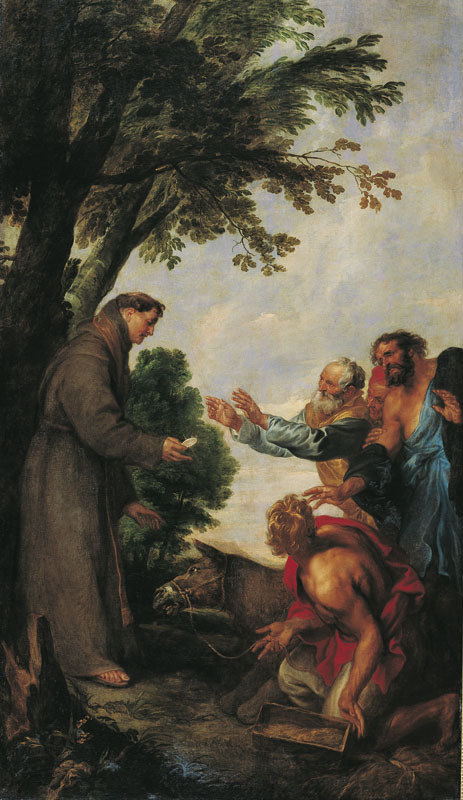
Antony of Padua and the Miracle of the Mule

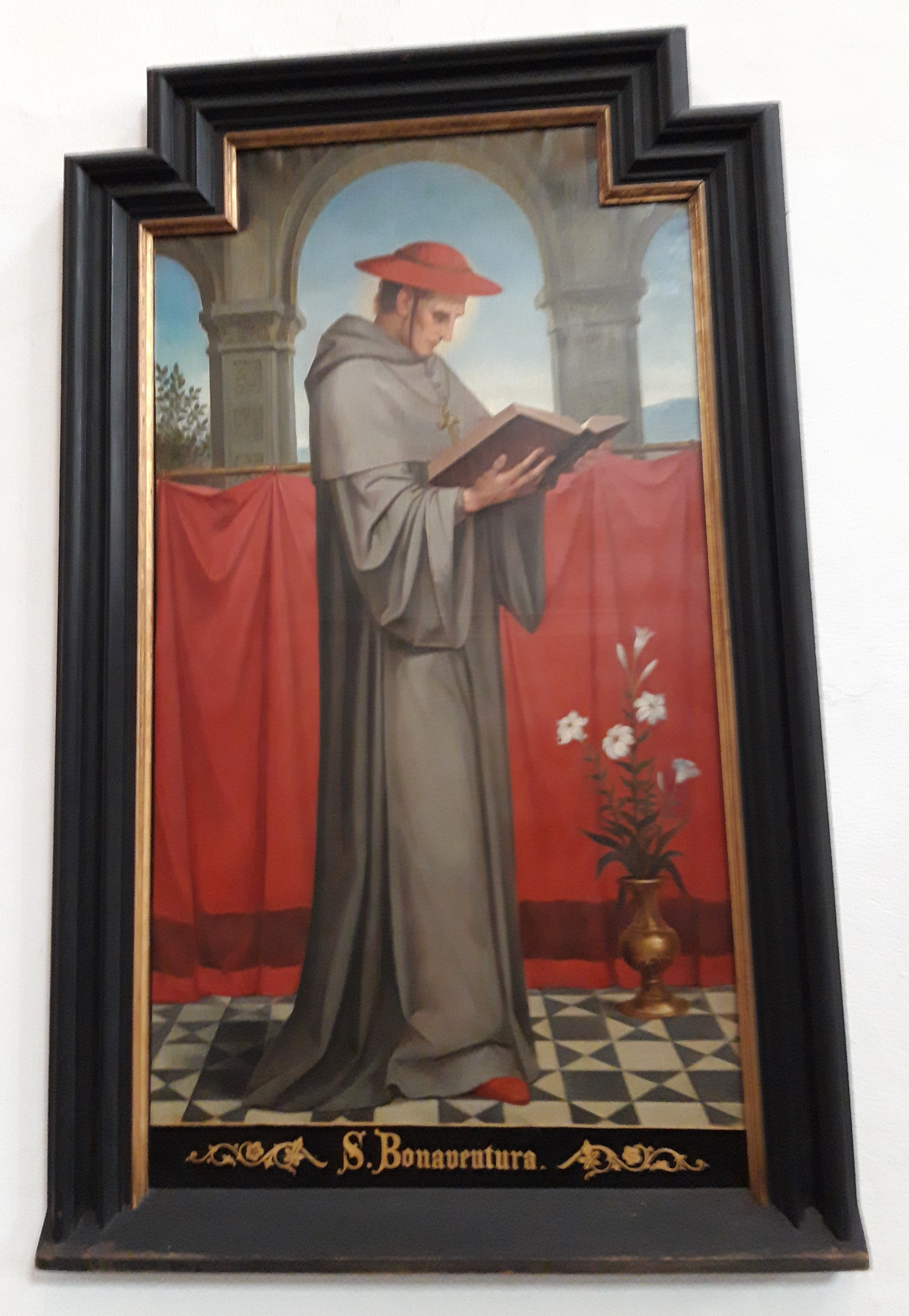
Bonaventure, the Seraphic Doctor

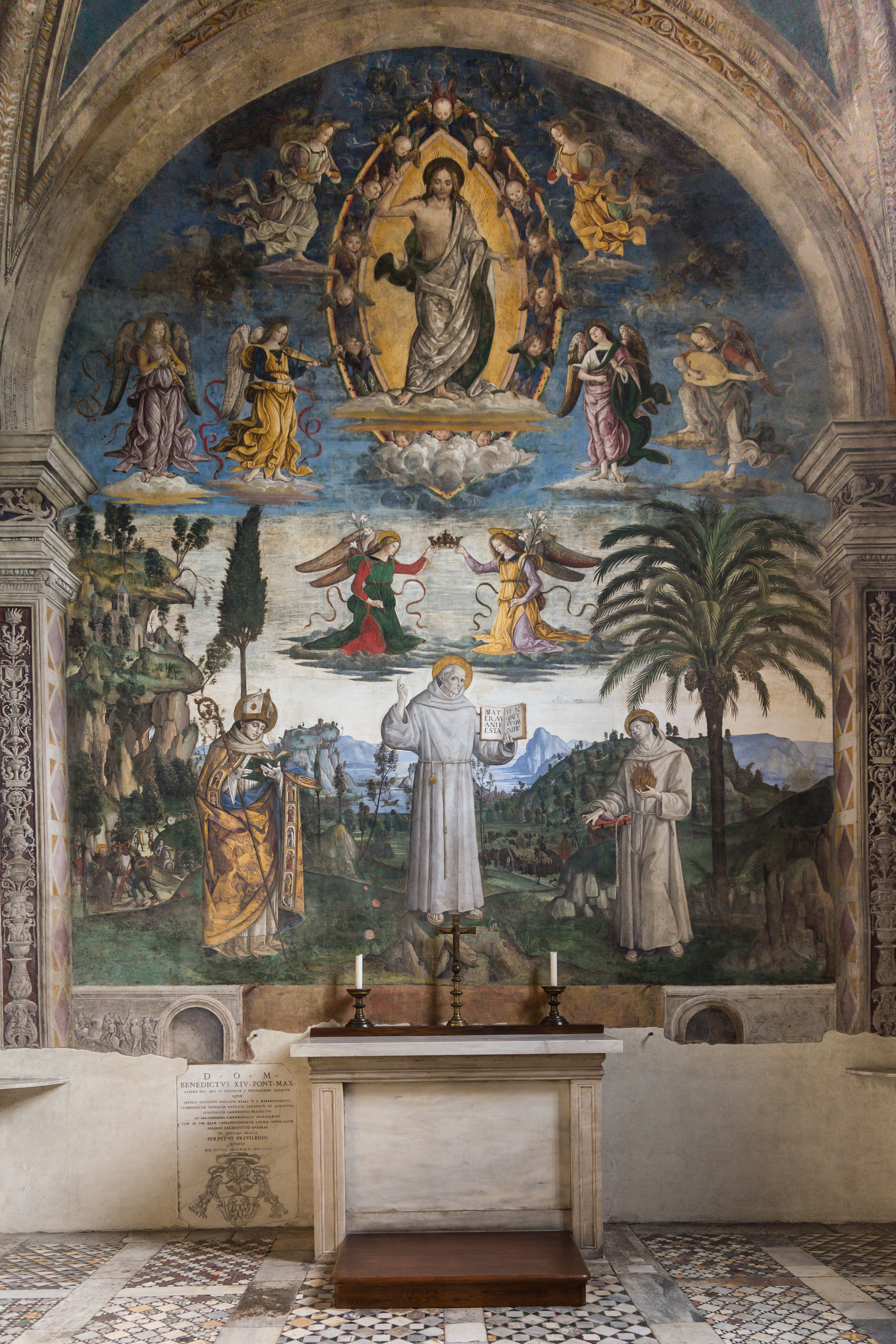
Triumph of Bernardino of Siena in The Aracoeli in Rome

Arranged according to date of death. Date of celebration or feast days are marked in brackets.

==== Saints ====
- Berardo di Carbio and 4 Companions (died 16 January 1220) The Seraphic Protomartyrs, canonized on 7 August 1481. (16 January)
- Francesco d'Assisi (Giovanni di Pietro di Bernardone) (c. 1181 – 3 October 1226), Seraphic Patriarch or Seraphic Father, mystic, missionary, and founder of the Order, canonized on 16 July 1228. (4 October – principal Feast, and 17 September – commemoration of the Stigmata)
- Daniele Fasanella di Belvedere and 6 Companions (died 10 October 1227), martyrs, canonized on 22 January 1516
- Antonio de Padua (Fernando Martins de Bulhões) (5 August 1195 – 13 June 1231), Portuguese friar and Doctor of the Church, canonized on 30 May 1232. (13 June)
- Bonaventura de Bagnoregio (Giovanni di Fidanza) (c. 1221 – 15 July 1274), early Franciscan scholar, Cardinal Bishop of Albano, and Doctor of the Church (Seraphic Doctor), canonized on 14 April 1482. (15 July)
- Louis de Toulouse (9 February 1274 – 19 August 1297), Bishop of Toulouse, canonized on 7 April 1317. (19 August)
- Nikola Tavelic and 3 Companions (died 14 November 1391), martyred in Jerusalem, canonized on 21 June 1970. (14 November)
- Bernardino da Siena (8 September 1380 – 20 May 1444), "Apostle of Italy", canonized on 24 May 1450. (20 May)
- Pedro de Regalado (c. 1390 – 30 March 1456), reformer, canonized on 29 June 1746. (13 May)
- Diego de Alcalá (Diego de San Nicolas) (c. 1400 – 12 November 1463), priest and missionary, canonized on 10 July 1588. (12 November)
- Giacomo della Marca (Domenico Gangala) (c. 1391 – 28 November 1476), papal legate and inquisitor, canonized on 10 December 1726. (28 November)
- Szymon of Lipnica (c. 1437 – 18 July 1482), Polish friar, canonized on 3 June 2007. (18 July)
- Giovanni da Capistrano (24 June 1386 – 23 October 1456), "The Soldier Saint" and inquisitor, canonized on 16 October 1690. (23 October)
- Pedro de Alcantara (Pedro Garavita) (c. 1499 – 18 October 1562), friar and mystic, canonized on 28 April 1669. (19 October)
- Salvador de Horta (Salvador Pladevall i Bien) (c. December 1520 – 18 March 1567), laybrother and miracle worker, canonized on 7 April 1938. (18 March)
- Nicolaas Pieck and 10 Companions (died 9 July 1572), Martyrs of Gorkum during the Protestant Reformation in the Netherlands, canonized on 29 June 1867. (9 July)
- Benedict the Moor (Benedetto Manasseri) (c. 1526 – 4 April 1589), priest of African descent, canonized on 24 May 1807. (3 April)
- Paschal Baylon (24 May 1540 – 15 May 1592), professed religious, canonized on 16 October 1690. (17 May)
- Pedro Bautista Blasquez Blasquez and 22 Companions (died 5 February 1597), Martyrs of Japan, canonized on 8 June 1862. (5 February)
- John Jones (c. 1530 – 12 July 1598), Martyr of the English Reformation, canonized on 25 October 1970. (12 July or 25 October or 4 May)
- Francis Solanus (Francisco Solano y Jimenez) (10 March 1549 – 14 July 1610), "Apostle of South America" and "Wonderworker of the New World", canonized on 27 December 1726 (24 July)
- Umile Pirozzo da Bisignano (Luca Antonio Pirozzo) (c. 1582 – 26 November 1637), professed religious, mystic, and wonderworker, canonized on 19 May 2002. (5 December).
- Pedro de San Jose de Betancur y Gonzales (21 March 1626 – 25 April 1667), "Saint Francis of Assisi of the Americas" and founder of the Bethlehemites, canonized on 30 July 2002. (25 April)
- Carlo di Sezze (Giancarlo Marchioni) (19 October 1613 – 6 January 1670), professed religious, canonized on 12 April 1959. (6 January)
- Joachim of Saint Anne (John Wall) (1620 – 22 August 1679), Martyr of the English Reformation, canonized on 25 October 1970. (12 July or 25 October or 4 May)
- Pacifico di San Severino (Carlo Antonio Divini) (1 March 1653 – 24 September 1721), priest and miracle-worker, canonized on 26 May 1839. (25 September)
- Tommaso da Cori (Francesco Antonio Placidi) (4 June 1655 – 11 January 1729), "Apostle of the Sublacense", canonized on 21 November 1999. (11 January)
- Giovanni Giuseppe della Croce (Carlo Gaetano Calosinto) (15 August 1654 – 5 March 1739), priest, canonized on 26 May 1839. (5 March)
- Teofilo di Corte (Biagio Arrighi) (30 October 1676 – 17 June 1740), priest, canonized on 29 June 1930. (19 May)
- Leonardo da Porto Maurizio (Paolo Girolamo Casanova) (20 December 1676 – 26 November 1751), priest and ascetic writer, canonized on 29 June 1867. (26 November)
- Junipero Serra Ferrer (Miquel Josep Serra i Ferrer) (24 November 1713 – 28 August 1784), "Apostle of California", canonized on 23 September 2015. (28 August)
- Egidio Maria di San Giuseppe (Francesco Pontillo) (16 November 1729 – 7 February 1812), professed religious and "Consoler of Naples", canonized on 2 June 1996. (7 February)
- Frei Galvão (Antônio de Sant'Anna) (13 May 1739 – 23 December 1822), the first Brazilian-born saint, canonized on 11 May 2007. (11 May)
- Manuel Ruiz Lopez and 7 Companions (died 9 and 10 July 1860), martyred by Druze during the 1860 civil conflict in Mount Lebanon and Damascus, canonized on 20 October 2024. (10 July)
- Ludovico da Casoria (Arcangelo Palmentieri) (11 March 1814 – 30 March 1885), founder of the Grey Friars of Charity and the Grey Sisters of Saint Elizabeth, canonized on 23 November 2014. (30 March)
- Giovanni da Triora and 9 Companions (died between 7 February 1816 to 9 July 1900), Martyrs of China, canonized on 1 October 2000. (9 July)

==== Blesseds ====
- Giovanni di Perugia and Pietro di Sassoferrato (died c. 1228), martyred at Valencia in Spain, beatified on 31 January 1705. (3 September)
- Bentivoglio de Bonis (c. 1188 – c. 1232), professed religious, beatified on 30 September 1852. (25 December)
- Benvenuto de Gubbio (Eugebino) (died c. 1232), one of the companions of St Francis of Assisi, beatified in c. 1697 (27 June)
- Pellegrino da Falerone (died c. 1233), one of the companions of St Francis of Assisi, beatified on 31 July 1821. (27 March)
- Liberato da Loro Piceno (c. 1180/1190 – c. 1231–34), priest, beatified on 2 September 1713. (6 September)
- Rizziero da Muccia (died 7 February 1236), one of the first followers of St Francis of Assisi, beatified on 14 December 1838. (7 February)
- Angelo da Pisa (c. 1195 – 7 May 1236), founder of the Franciscans in England and its first minister provincial in the country, beatified on 4 September 1892. (8 May)
- Ruggero da Todi (c. 1190 – 5 January 1237), one of the first followers of St Francis of Assisi, beatified on 15 April 1752. (5 January)
- Stephen of Saint-Thibéry and Fortanerius (died 28 May 1242), inquisitors martyred at Avignonet in a mission to eradicate the Cathar heresy, beatified on 6 September 1866. (29 May)
- Guido Pagnotelli da Cortona (c. 1187 – c. 1247), one of the first followers of St Francis of Assisi, beatified in 1583. (12 Jun)
- Andrea Caccioli da Spello (30 November 1194 – 3 June 1254), the first priest to enter the Franciscans and served as one of the disciples of Francis of Assisi himself, beatified on 25 July 1738. (3 June)
- Gualteri de Guimarães (died c. 1259), Portuguese priest, beatified on 17 December 1577. (1 August)
- Gandolfo da Binasco (Gandolfo Sacchi) (c. 1200 or 1201 – 3 April 1260), one of the first followers of St Francis of Assisi, beatified on 10 March 1881. (3 April)
- Egidio d'Assisi (c. 1190 – 23 April 1262), early companion of Francis of Assisi, beatified on 4 July 1777. (23 April)
- Benvenuto Mareni da Recanati (c. 1188 – 5 May 1269), professed religious, beatified on 17 September 1796. (5 May)
- Giovanni da Penna San Giovanni (c. 1200 – c. 1270), one of the companions of St Francis of Assisi, beatified on 20 December 1806. (3 April)
- Cristoforo di Romagna (c. 1172 – 31 October 1272), priest, beatified on 12 April 1905. (31 October)
- Luca Belludi di Padova (between 1200 and 1210 – 17 February 1286), priest and friend of Saint Anthony of Padua, beatified on 18 May 1927. (17 February)
- Giovanni Buralli di Parma (5 March 1208 – 19 March 1289), one of the first Ministers General of the Order of Friars Minor, beatified on 1 March 1777. (20 March)
- Corrado Miliani d'Ascoli (18 September 1234 – 19 April 1289), professed religious, beatified on 30 August 1793. (19 April)
- Pietro da Treia (c. 1227 – 19 February 1304), professed religious, beatified on 11 September 1793. (20 February)
- Ranieri dal Borgo (Ranieri da Sansepolcro) (died 1 November 1304), professed religious, beatified on 18 December 1802. (31 October)
- Corrado di Offida (c. 1241 – 12 December 1306), founder of the now-extinct Celestine order, beatified on 21 April 1817. (19 December)
- John Duns Scotus (born between 23 December 1265 and 17 March 1266 – 8 November 1308), Scottish-born philosopher and theologian of the High Middle Ages, beatified on 20 March 1993. (8 November)
- Tomasso di Tolentino and 3 Companions (died 8 April 1321), missionaries martyred in Thane, Further India, beatified on 23 July 1894. (9 April)
- Francesco da Fabriano (Francesco Venimbeni) (2 September 1251 – 22 April 1322), priest and writer, beatified on 1 April 1775. (14 May)
- Giovanni della Verna di Fermo (c. 1259 – 10 August 1322), ascetic and preacher, beatified on 24 June 1880. (9 August)
- Bartolomeo Pucci-Franceschi (died 6 May 1330), priest, beatified on 24 June 1880. (6 May)
- Odorico da Pordenone (c. 1280 – 14 January 1331), missionary and explorer, beatified on 14 January 1331. (3 February)
- Gentile di Matelica (Gentile Finaguerra) (c. 1290 – 5 September 1340), missionary martyred at Tabriz in Persia, beatified on 2 February 1795. (7 September)
- Gerardo Cagnoli (c. 1267 – 29 December 1342), professed religious, beatified on 13 May 1908. (29 December)
- Giuliano Cesarello da Valle d'Istria (Julijan iz Bala) (died 1343 or 1349), Croatian professed religious, beatified on 23 February 1910. (1 May)
- Jean le Déchaussé (Jean Discalceat) (c. 1279 – 15 December 1349), Breton professed religious, beatified on 4 April 1989. (15 December)
- Sante da Urbino (Giansante Brancorsini) (c. 1343 – c. 1394), professed religious, beatified on 11 August 1770. (14 August)
- Juan Lorenzo de Cetina (c. 1340 – 19 May 1397), martyred in Granada, beatified on 29 August 1731. (19 May)
- Pedro de Dueñas (c. 1377 – 19 May 1397), martyred in Granada, beatified on 29 August 1731. (19 May)
- Jakub Strzemię (c. 1340 – 20 October 1409), Archbishop of Halicz, beatified on 11 September 1791. (20 October)
- Matteo de Agrigento (Matteo Guimera or Gimara) (c. 1376 – 7 January 1450), Bishop of Agrigento, beatified on 22 February 1767. (7 January)
- Ercolano da Piegaro (12 October 1390 – 28 May 1451), professed religious, beatified on 29 March 1860. (28 May)
- Gabriele Ferretti (c. 1385 – 12 November 1456), priest, beatified on 19 September 1753. (9 November)
- Arcangelo Placenza da Calatafimi (c. 1390 – 24 July 1460), preacher, beatified on 9 September 1836. (10 August or 27 July)
- Antonio da Stroncone (Antonio Vici) (c. 1391 – 7 February 1461), friar, beatified on 28 June 1687. (14 February)
- Marco Fantuzzi da Bologna (c. 1405 – c. 1479), professed religious, beatified on 5 March 1868. (10 April)
- Pacifico di Ceredano (Pacifico Ramati) (c. 1424 – 4 June 1482), priest, beatified on 7 July 1745. (5 June)
- Antonio Bonfadini (c. 1400 – 1 December 1482), priest, beatified on 13 May 1901. (1 December)
- Cristoforo Macassoli da Milano (c. 1415 – 5 March 1485), priest, beatified on 23 July 1890. (5 March)
- Pietro di Mogliano (Pietro Corradini) (c. 1435 – 25 July 1490), priest, beatified on 10 August 1760. (25 July)
- Baldassare Ravaschieri (c. 1420 – 17 October 1492), priest, beatified on 8 January 1930. (16 or 17 October)
- Bernardino di Feltre (Martino Tomitani) (c. 1439 – 28 September 1494), reorganizer of the monti di pietà, beatified on 13 April 1654. (28 September)
- Angelo Carletti di Chivasso (c. 1410 – 11 April 1495), professed religious, theologian and humanist, beatified on 14 April 1753. (12 April)
- Marco de Marchio da Montegallo (c. 1425 – 19 March 1496), priest, beatified on 20 September 1839. (20 March)
- Giacomo da Bitetto (Jakov Zadranin) (c. 1400 – 27 April 1485 or 1496), Croatian friar, beatified on 29 December 1700. (20 April)
- Bernardino da Fossa (c. 1420 – 27 November 1503), historian and ascetical writer, beatified on 26 March 1828. (7 November)
- Vincenzo dell'Aquila (c. 1435 – 7 August 1504), priest, beatified on 19 September 1787. (7 August)
- Timoteo da Monticchio (c. 1444 – 22 August 1504), priest, beatified on 10 March 1870. (22 August)
- Władysław z Gielniowa (Marcin Jan) (c. 1440 – 4 May 1505), Polish priest, beatified on 11 February 1750. (4 May).
- Francesco da Caldarola (Francesco Piani) (c. 1424 – c. 1507), priest, beatified on 1 September 1843. (6 September)
- Egidio da Laurenzana (Bernardino di Bello) (c. 1443 – 10 January 1518), professed religious, beatified on 27 June 1880. (10 January)
- Lorenzo da Villamagna (Aurelio de Masculis) (12 May 1476 – 6 June 1535). priest, beatified on 28 February 1923. (6 June)
- John Forest (c. 1471 – 22 May 1538), martyred at Smithfield in London during the English Reformation, beatified on 29 December 1886. (22 May or 4 May)
- Giovanni da Fabriano (Giovanni Battista Righi) (c. 1469 – c. 1539), priest, beatified on 7 September 1903. (11 March)
- Patrick O'Hely (between 1543/46 – 31 August 1579), Bishop of Mayo martyred during the Protestant Reformation in Ireland, beatified on 27 September 1992. (20 June)
- Conn O'Rourke (.c 1549 – 31 August 1579), priest martyred during the Protestant Reformation in Ireland, beatified on 27 September 1992. (20 June)
- Nicolás Factor (29 June 1520 – 23 December 1583), priest and painter, beatified on 27 August 1786. (23 December).
- Dermot O'Hurley (c. 1530 – 19 or 20 June 1584), Archbishop of Cashel martyred during the Protestant Reformation in Ireland, beatified on 27 September 1992. (20 June)
- Pedro de Corpa and 4 Companions (died between 14 and 17 September 1597), Martyrs of Georgia during the Christianization of the United States, decree of martyrdom promulgated on 27 January 2025 and are currently awaiting beatification
- Sebastián de Aparicio y del Pardo (20 January 1502 – 25 February 1600), lay-brother, beatified on 17 May 1789. (25 February)
- Andrés Hibernón Real (c. 1534 – 18 April 1602), professed religious, beatified on 22 May 1791. (18 April)
- Julián de San Agustín (Julián Martinet Gutiérrez) (c. 1550 – 8 April 1606), lay-brother, beatified on 23 May 1825. (8 April)
- Bedrich Bachstein and 13 Companions (died 15 February 1611), Martyrs of Prague during the Protestant Reformation in the Kingdom of Bavaria, beatified on 13 October 2012. (15 February)
- Conor O'Devany (c. 1532 – 11 February 1612), Bishop of Down and Connor martyred during the Protestant Reformation in Ireland, beatified on 27 September 1992. (20 June)
- Luis Sotelo and Ludovicus Sasada (died 25 August 1624), martyred in Ōmura, Nagasaki, beatified on 7 July 1867. (25 August)
- Juan Santamarta and 15 Companions (died between 16 August 1618 to 3 September 1632) martyred in Japan, beatified on 7 July 1867. (12 September)
- Juan de Prado (c. 1563 – 24 May 1631), missionary martyred in Marrakesh, beatified on 24 May 1728. (24 May)
- John Baptist Bullaker (Thomas Bullaker) (c. 1603 or 1604 – 12 October 1642), Martyr of the English Reformation, beatified on 22 November 1987. (4 May or 22 November)
- Paul of Saint Magdalene (Henry Heath) (c. 1599 or 1600 – 17 April 1643), Martyr of the English Reformation, beatified on 22 November 1987. (4 May or 22 November)
- Francis Bell (Arthur Bell) (13 January 1590 – 11 December 1643), Martyr of the English Reformation, beatified on 22 November 1987. (4 May or 22 November)
- Martin of Saint Felix (John Woodcock) (c. 1603 – 7 August 1646), Martyr of the English Reformation, beatified on 22 November 1987. (4 May or 22 November)
- John Kearney (c. 1619 – 11 March 1653), martyred during the Protestant Reformation in Ireland, beatified on 27 September 1992. (20 June)
- Charles Meehan (c. 1640 – 12 August 1679), Martyr of the English Reformation, beatified on 22 November 1987. (4 May or 22 November)
- Bonaventura Gran de Barcelona (Miguel Baptista Gran Peris) (24 November 1620 – 11 September 1684), Catalan friar, beatified on 10 June 1906. (24 November)
- Johannes Laurentius (Liberat) Weiss and 2 Companions (died 3 March 1716), missionaries martyred in Gondar, Ethiopia, beatified on 20 November 1988. (4 March)
- Modestino di Gesu e Maria (Domenico Mazzarella) (5 September 1802 – 4 July 1854), priest, beatified on 29 January 1995. (4 July)
- Mariano da Roccacasale (Domenico di Nicolantonio) (13 January 1778 – 31 May 1866), professed religious, beatified on 3 October 1999. (31 May)
- Mamerto Esquiú Medina (Mamerto de la Ascensión Esquiú) (11 May 1826 – 10 January 1883), Bishop of Córdoba in Argentina, beatified on 4 September 2021. (11 May)
- Salvatore Lilli (19 June 1853 – 22 November 1895), martyred by the Turks for refusing to embrace Islam, beatified on 3 October 1982. (22 November)
- Johannes Ludovicus (Valentinus) Paquay (17 November 1828 – 1 January 1905), Belgian priest, beatified on 9 November 2003. (1 January)
- Mati (Luigj) Paliq (20 February 1877 – 7 March 1913), Kosovan friar martyred during the Communist rule in Albania, beatified on 16 November 2024. (7 March)
- Frédéric de Saint-Yves (Frédéric-Cornil Janssoone) (19 November 1838 – 4 August 1916), French-born friar who re-established the Order of Friars Minor in Canada, beatified on 25 September 1988. (5 August)
- Baltasar Mariano (Buenaventura) Muñoz Martínez and Miguel (Antonio) Faúndez López (died 4 September 1936 and 19 September 1936), Martyrs of the Spanish Civil War, beatified on 13 October 2013 (6 November)
- Pascual Fortuño Almela and 3 Companions (died 8 September 1936), Martyrs of the Spanish Civil War, beatified on 11 March 2001 (22 September)
- Victor Chumillas Fernández and 28 Companions (died between 16 August to 22 September 1936), Martyrs of the Spanish Civil War, beatified on 28 October 2007 (6 November)
- Gabriel Olivares Roda and Francisco Solinas Sanchez (died 20 December 1936 and 22 May 1938), Martyrs of the Spanish Civil War, beatified on 25 March 2017. (6 November)
- Domingo (Jose) Roig Llorca and 2 Companions (died 24 July 1936 and 31 July 1936), Martyrs of the Spanish Civil War, beatified on 16 October 2021. (6 November)
- Jan (Narcyz) Turchan (19 September 1879 – 19 March 1942), martyred during the Nazi Occupation of Poland, beatified on 13 June 1999. (12 June)
- Jan (Marcin) Oprzadek (4 March 1884 – 18 May 1942), martyred during the Nazi Occupation of Poland, beatified on 13 June 1999. (12 June)
- Anastazy Jakub Pankiewicz (9 July 1882 – 20 May 1942), founder of the Antonian Sisters of Christ the King and martyred during the Nazi Occupation of Poland, beatified on 13 June 1999. (12 June)
- Wojciech (Krystyn) Gondek (6 April 1909 – 23 July 1942), martyred during the Nazi Occupation of Poland, beatified on 13 June 1999. (12 June)
- Jan (Brunon) Zembol (7 September 1905 – 21 August 1942), martyred during the Nazi Occupation of Poland, beatified on 13 June 1999. (12 June)
- Vinçenc (Nikoll) Prennushi and 7 Companions (died between 4 March 1946 to 4 April 1954), martyred during the Communist rule in Albania, beatified on 5 November 2016. (5 November)
- Gerard-Martin Cendrier and 3 Companions (died between 24 January to 26 April 1945), French clerics martyred by Nazis during World War II, decree of martyrdom promulgated on 20 June 2025 and are currently awaiting beatification
- Claudio Granzotto (Riccardo Granzotto) (23 August 1900 – 15 August 1947), professed religious and sculptor, beatified on 20 November 1994. (15 August)
- Gabriele Allegra (Giovanni Stefano Allegra) (26 December 1907 – 26 January 1976), missionary to China, biblical scholar, and translator of the Bible into the Chinese language, beatified on 29 September 2012. (26 January)
- Cosma Spessotto Zamuner (Sante Spessotto) (28 January 1923 – 14 June 1980), Italian missionary martyred in El Salvador, beatified on 22 January 2022. (14 June)
- Marcello "Tullio" Maruzzo (23 July 1929 – 1 July 1981), Italian missionary martyred in Guatemala, beatified on 27 October 2018. (1 July)

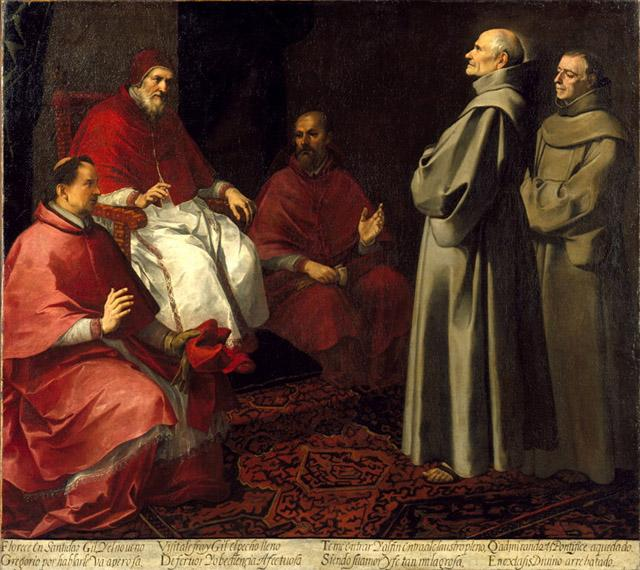
Brother Giles before the Pope, Murillo

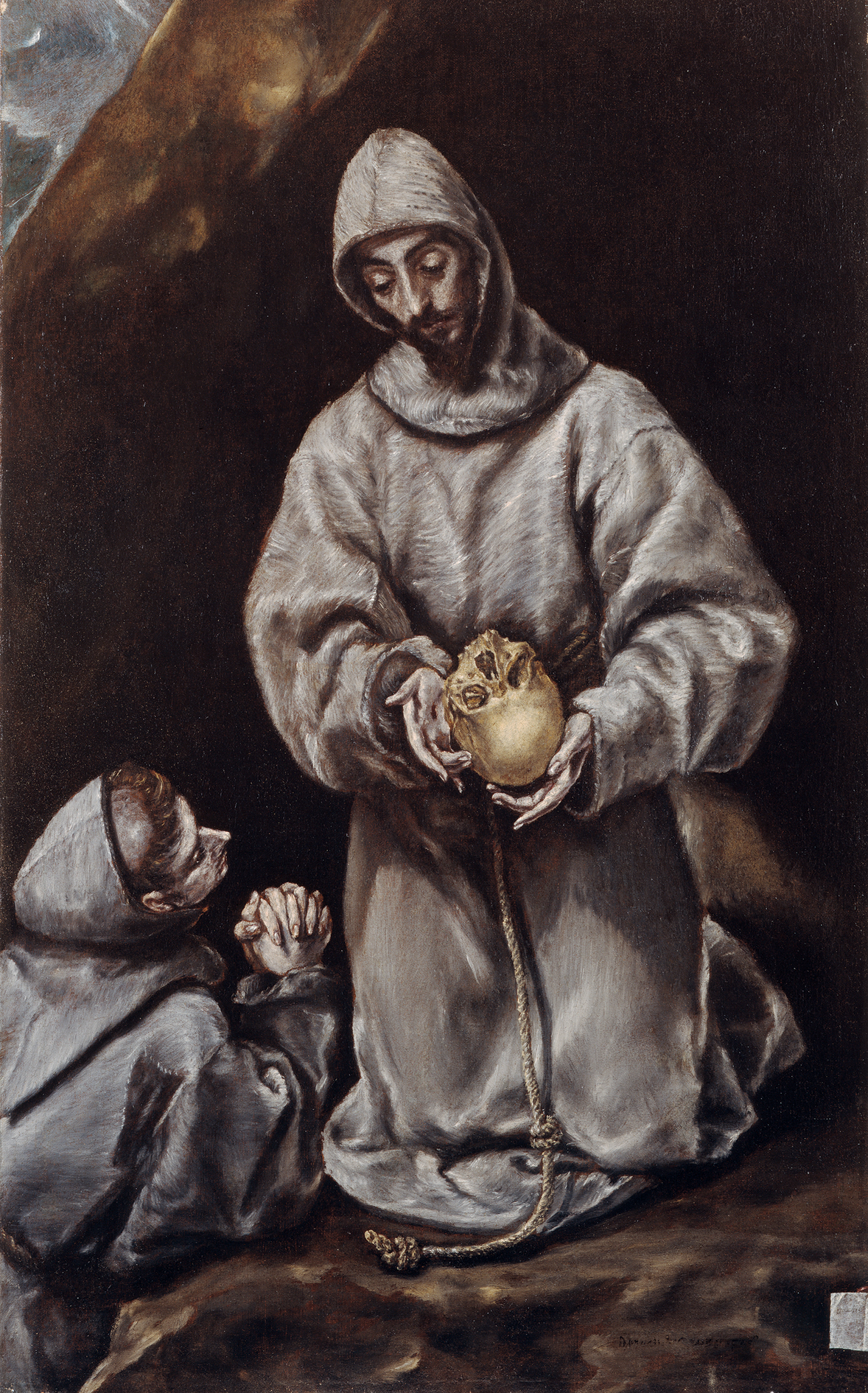
Francis of Assisi and Brother Leo in Meditation, El Greco

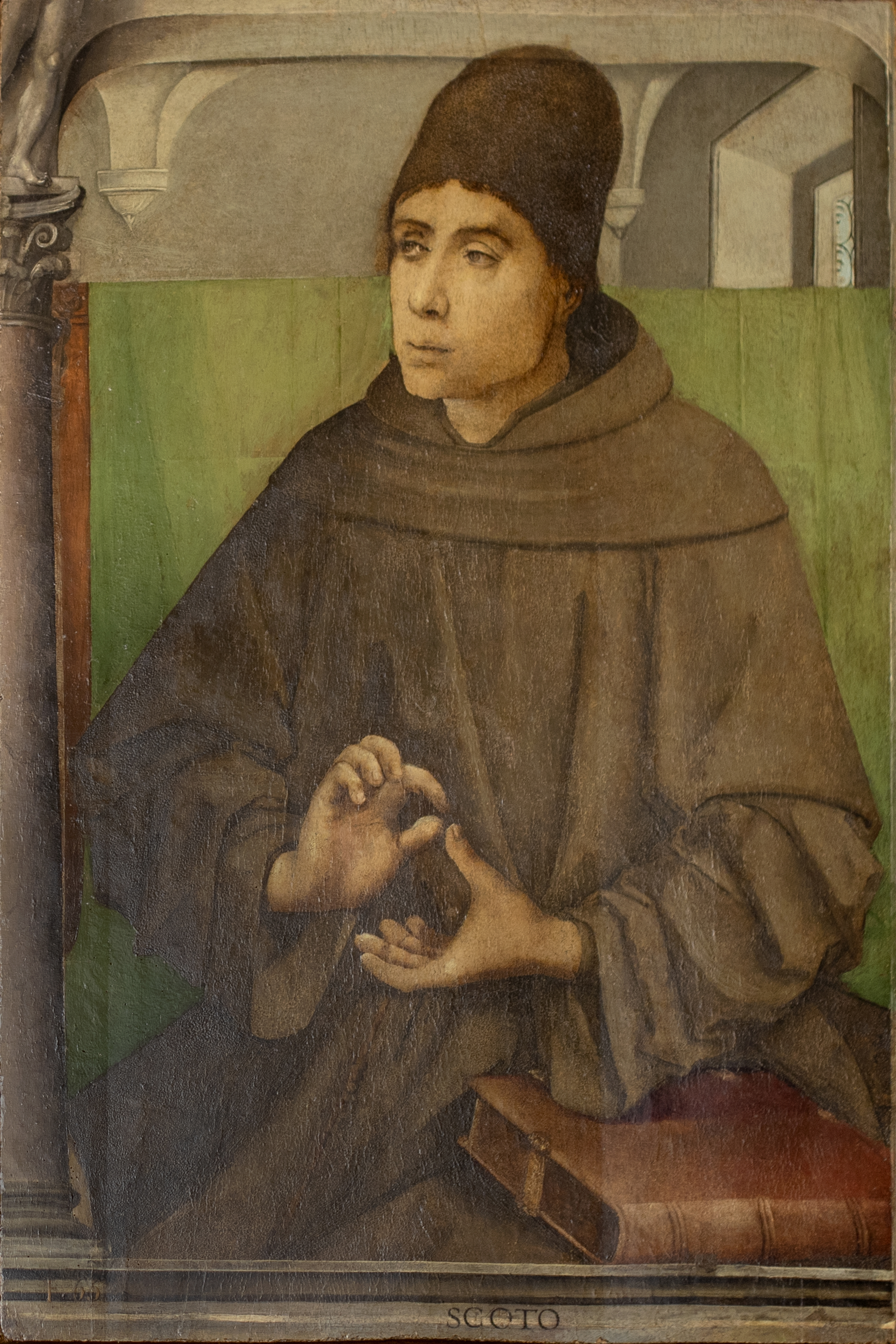
Blessed John Duns Scotus, van Ghent

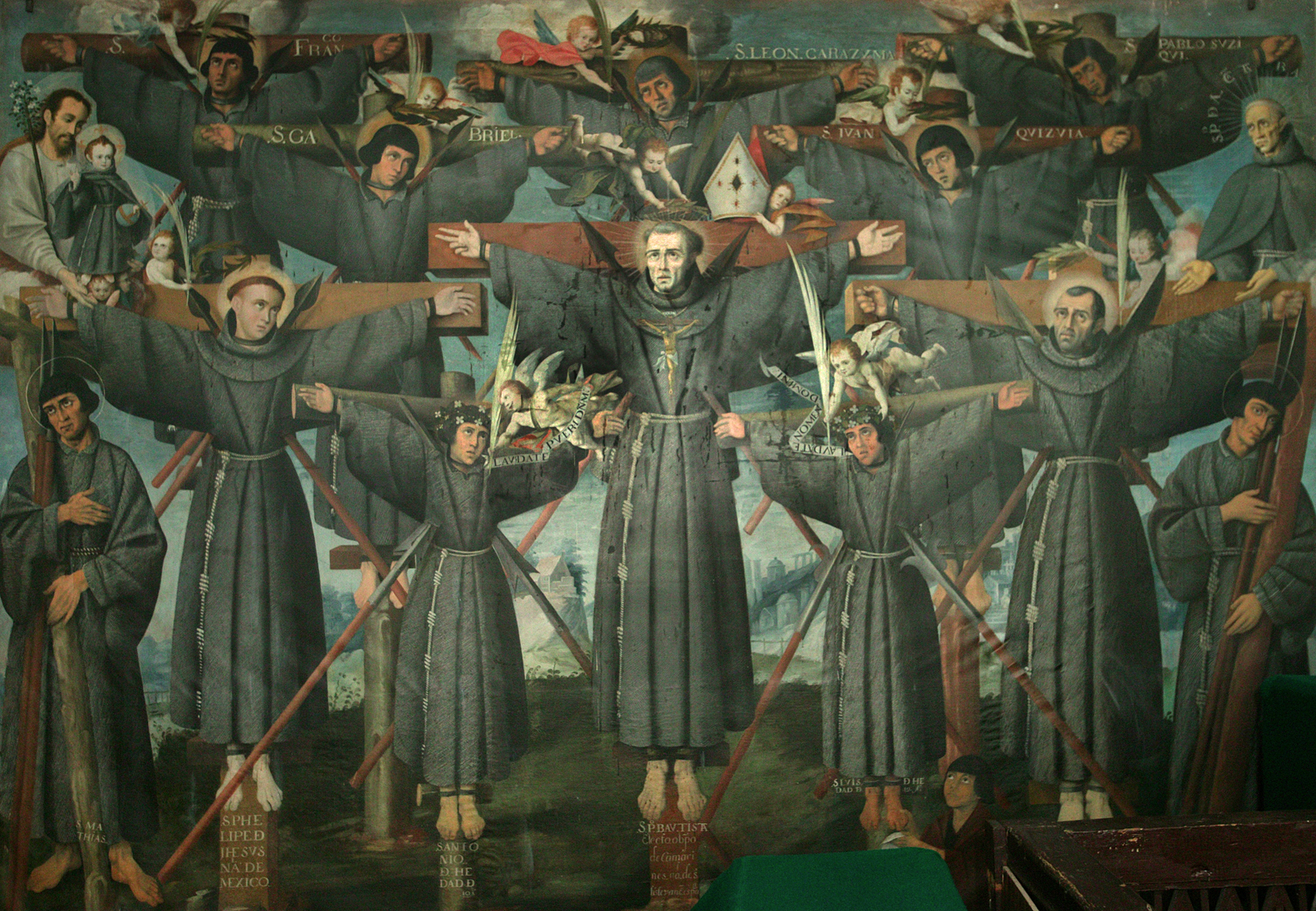
The Nagasaki Martyrs

Declared "Blessed" by popular acclaim (unofficially beatified)

- Alberto de Albertis de Pisa (died 23 January 1240), Third Minister General of the Order
- Bernardo di Quintavalle (died 10 July 1241), one of the first followers of St Francis of Assisi. (10 July)
- Simone da Collazzone (Simone della Contessa) (c. 1203 – 24 April 1250), one of the first followers of St Francis of Assisi.
- Angelo Tancredi (c. 1195 – 13 February 1258), one of the companions of St Francis of Assisi. (13 February)
- Filippo Longo di Atri (died 14 March 1259), professed religious and one of St. Francis' first companions (14 March)
- Leone d'Assisi (died 15 November 1271), one of the favorite companions of St Francis of Assisi. (15 November)
- Monaldo da Capodistria (c. 1208 – c. 1280), theologian and canonist (9 November)
- Benedetto Sinigardi (c. 1190 – 2 September 1282), author of the Angelus prayer (13 May or 3 August)
- Jacopone da Todi (c. between 1230 and 1236 – 25 December 1306), poet and writer. (25 December)
- Giovanni di Montecorvino (c. 1247 – possibly 3 January 1328), early missionary to China. (1 or 3 January)
- Paoluccio (Paolo Trinci) di Vagnozzo da Foligno (c. 1309 – 17 September 1391), who instituted the reform of Franciscan teriaries (17 September)
- Tomasuccio da Foligno da Nocera, O.F.M. (c. 1319 – c. 15 September 1400?), itinerant preacher (15 September)
- Alberto Berdini da Sarteano (c. 1385 – 15 August 1450), "The King of Preachers" and diplomatic envoy of Pope Eugene IV to the Coptic and Ethiopian churches. (15 August)
- Amadeus of Portugal (c. 1420 – 10 August 1482), reformer of the Order. (12 August)
- Michele de Carcanis de Mediolano (c. 1427 – 20 March 1484), known for his part in founding the montes pietatis banking system, with Bernardine of Feltre. (14 October)
- Sisto Brioschi di Milano (c. 1404 – 22 November 1486), priest (22 November)
- Bernardino Caimi (c. 1425 – 9 February 1500), professed religious (9 February)
- Bartolomeo Magi di Anghiari (c. 1460 – c. 25 May? 1510), Master of Novices at the Convent of La Verna (25 May)

==== Friars declared Venerable or Servant of God ====
- Juniper of Assisi, d. 1258 (29 Jan.);
- Sylvester of Assisi, d. 1240 (6 March);
- Antonio Margil, d. 1726 (8 Aug.);
- Francesco Gonzaga, d. 1620;
- Thomas of Celano, d. 1265.

=== Missionaries ===
==== In China, Mongolia, India, and the Far East ====
- Stephen of Bohemia (d. 1247)
- William of Rubruck (d. unknown, late 13th cent)
- James of Ireland (d. 1330)
- Juan de Plasencia (d. 1590)
- Martín Ignacio de Loyola (d. 1606)
- Melchor Oyanguren de Santa Inés (d. 1747)
- Mei Zhanchun, martyr (d. 1923)
- Salesius Lemmens (d. 1942)
- Cyrillus Jarre (d. 1952)

==== In North Africa and the Middle East ====
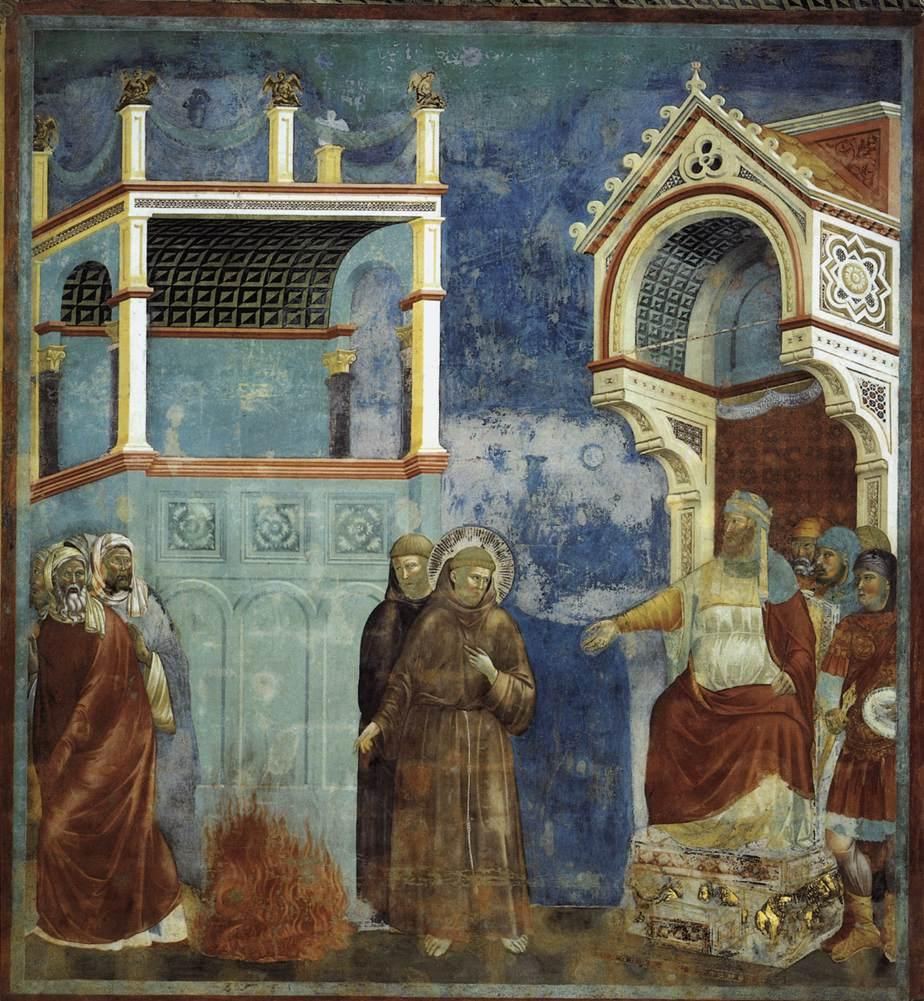
Francis of Assisi and Illuminatus of Arce before the sultan. Fresco by Giotto.

- Illuminatus of Arce (d. c.1260-66)
- Angelo of Tolentino (d. unknown, after 1289)
- Mark of Montelupone (d. unknown, after 1292)
- Pietro da Macerata (d. 1307)
- Angelo da Clareno (d. 1337)
- Francesco Suriano (d. unknown, after 1512)
- Elzear Horn (d. 1744)
- Giulio Basetti-Sani (d. 2001)
- Frediano Giannini (d. 1939)
- Alberto Gori (d. 1970)
- Francesco Patton (born 1963)

==== In North America ====
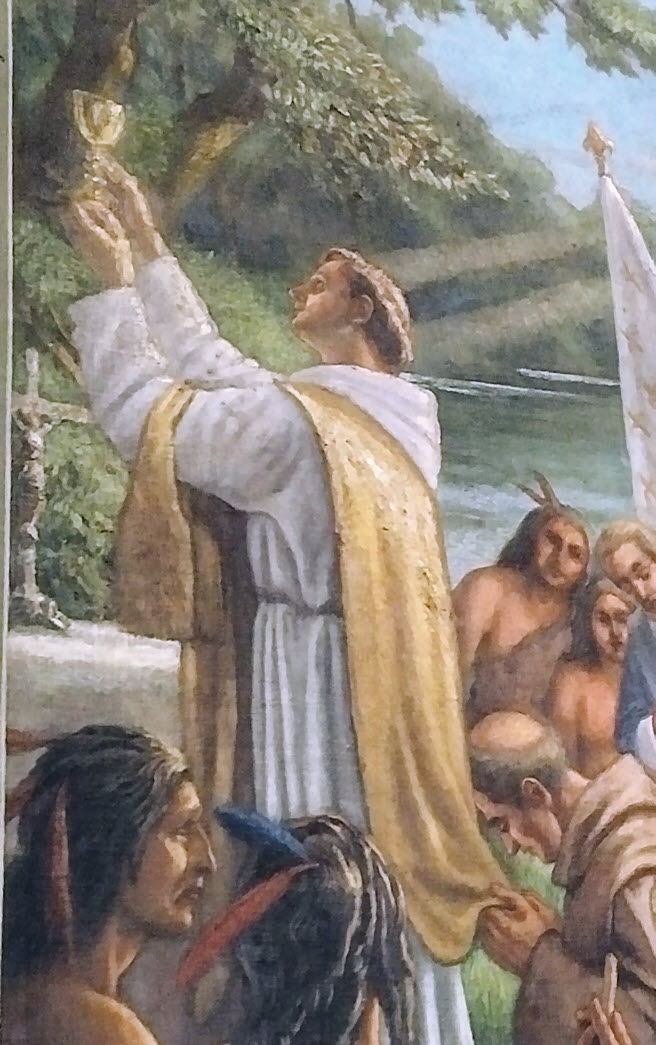
Denis Jamay in 1615

- Denis Jamet (d. 1625)
- Nicolas Viel (d. 1625)
- Joseph Le Caron (d. 1632)
- Gabriel Sagard (d. 1636)
- Jean Dolbeau (d. 1652)
- Zenobius Membre (d. c.1687)
- Chrestien Le Clercq (d. unclear, after 1691)
- Louis Hennepin (d. 1704)
- José María de Zalvidea (d. 1846)
- John Dalton (d. 1869)
- Pamfilo of Magliano (d. 1876)
- Anselm Weber (d. 1921)
- Anton Docher (d. 1928)

==== In South and Central America ====
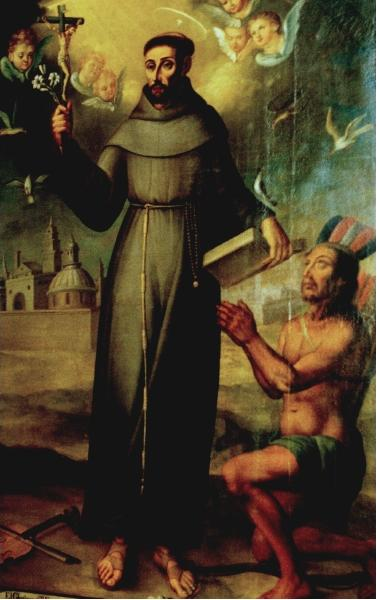
Francis Solanus, Apostle of South America, with a native of Tucuman

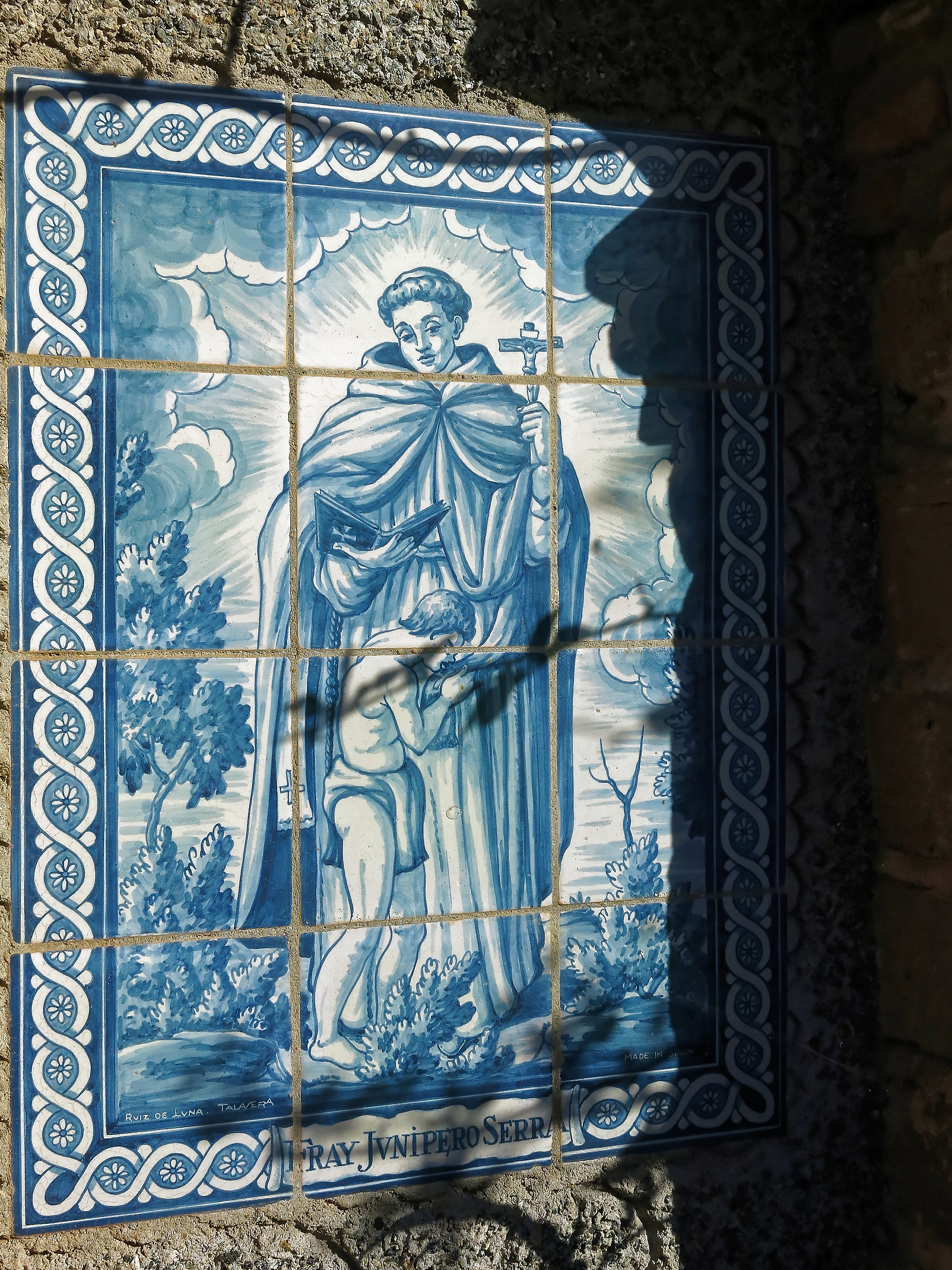
Junipero Serra, Apostle of California

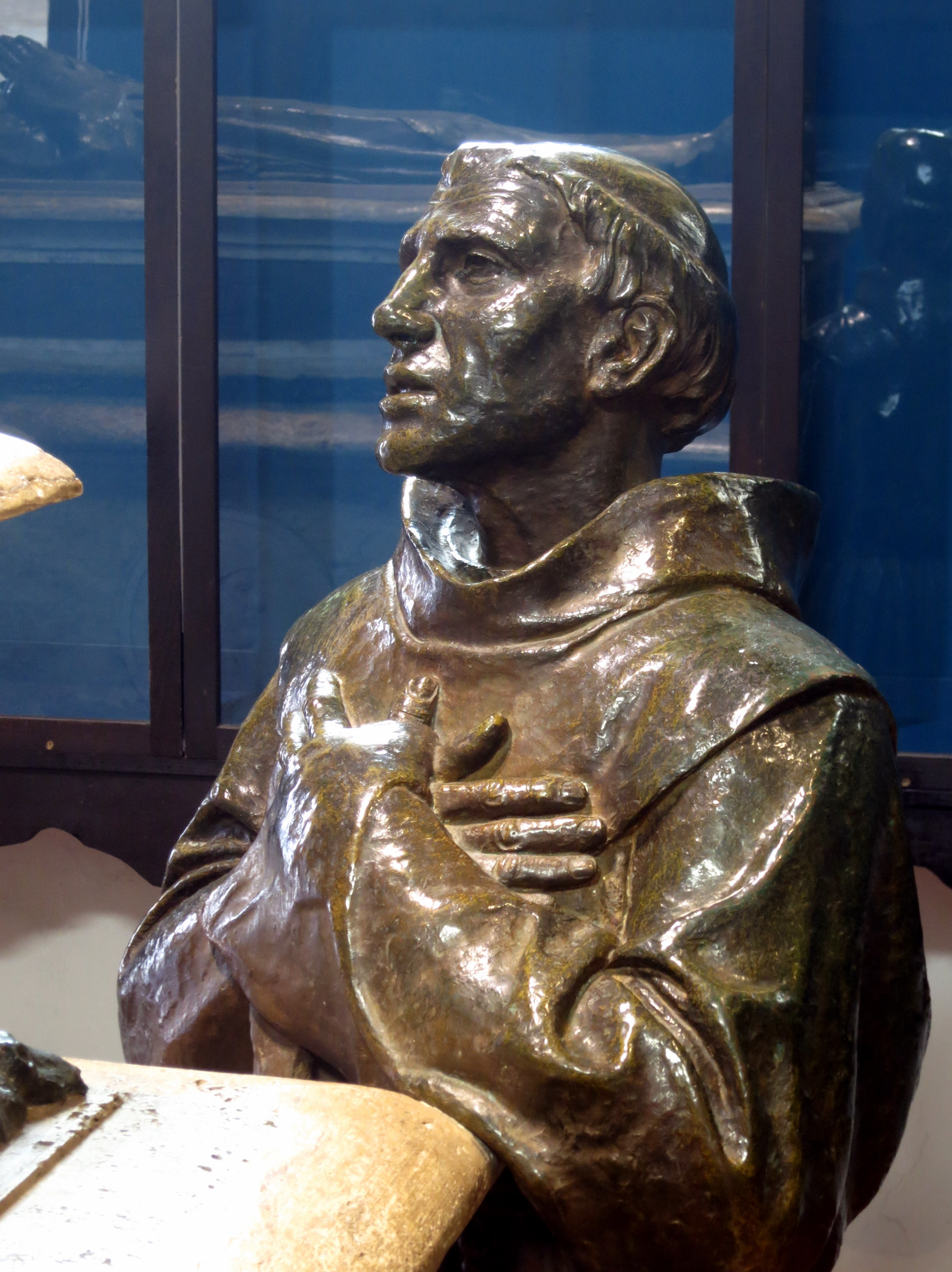
Fermín de Lasuén, founder of Santa Barbara and Santa Cruz in California

- Juan de Tecto (d. 1526)
- Juan Juárez (d. 1528)
- Martín de Valencia, leader of the Twelve Apostles of Mexico (d. 1534)
- Antonio de Ciudad Rodrigo (d. unclear, c.1540)
- Francisco de Soto (d. 1563)
- Toribio de Benavente (d. 1565)
- Pedro de Aguado (d. unclear, c.1589–1608)
- Alonso de San Buenaventura (d. 1594)
- Francisco Pareja (d. 1628)
- Martín de Arvide, martyr (d. 1630 or 32, 27 Feb)
- Alonso de Benavides (d. 1635)
- Juan Coronel (d. 1651)
- Tomás Manso (d. 1659)
- Alonso de Posada (d. unknown, late 17th early 18th century)
- Francisco de Ayeta (d. unclear, c.1689–1690)
- Antonio de Olivares (d. 1722)
- Isidro de Espinosa (d. 1755)
- Luis Jayme (d. 1775)
- Juan Crespí, companion of Junipero Serra (d. 1782)
- Francisco Palóu, founder of San Francisco (d. 1789)
- Juan de Santa Gertrudis (d. 1799)
- Fermín de Lasuén, founder of Santa Barbara and Santa Cruz in California (d. 1803)
- José Francisco de Paula Señan (d. 1823)
- Francisco García Diego y Moreno (d. 1846)
- José González Rubio (d. 1875)
- Odorico D'Andrea (d. 1990)
- Mariano Gagnon (d. 2017)

==== In Sub-Saharan Africa ====
- Giacomo Bini (d. 2014)
- Tadeusz Kusy (d. 2024)

==== In the South Pacific ====
- Patrick Geoghegan (d. 1864)
- Laurence Sheil (d. 1872)
- Ottavio Barsanti (d. 1884)
- Charles Horan (d. 1900)

=== Prelates ===
==== Bishops ====
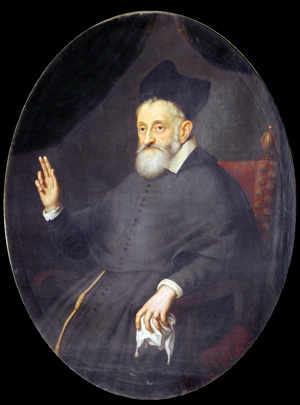
Venerable Francesco Gonzaga, Bishop of Mantua

- John Pecham (d. 1292)
- Bonaventura Secusio (d. 1618)
- Francesco Gonzaga (d. 1620)
- Domenico Giordani (d. 1640)
- Dionysius O'Driscoll (d. 1650)
- Teofilo Testa (d. 1695)
- Fernando Cardiñanos (d. 1794)
- Michael Anthony Fleming (d. 1850)
- Enrico Carfagnini (d. 1904)
- Nicolás Armentia Ugarte (d. 1909)
- Vinçenc Prennushi (d. 1949)
- Rémy-Louis Leprêtre (d. 1961)
- Settimio Ferrazzetta (d. 1999)
- Benedict D. Coscia (d. 2008)
- Michael Lenihan (born 1951)
- Francis Xavier Yu Soo-il (born 1945)

==== Cardinals ====
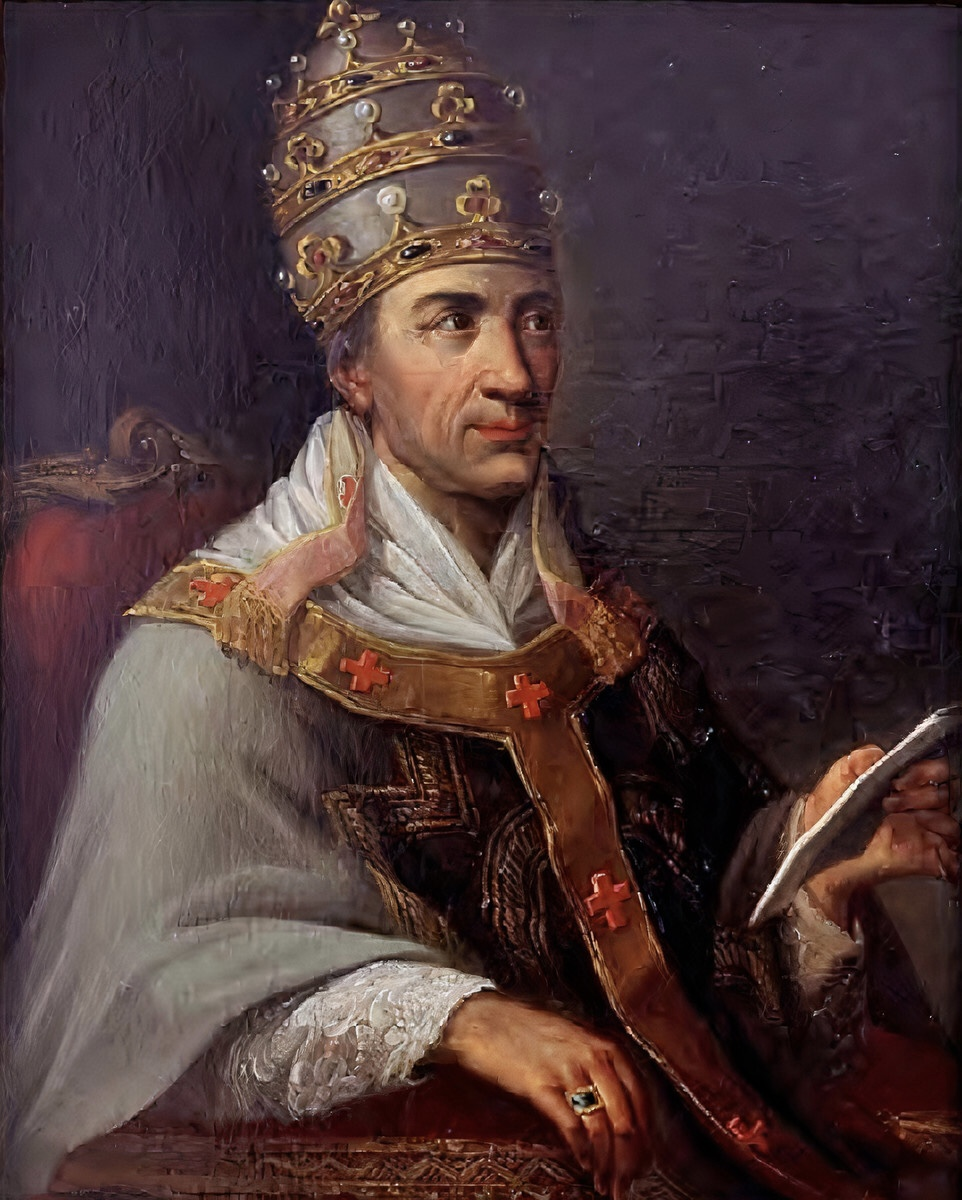
Nicholas IV, first Franciscan pope

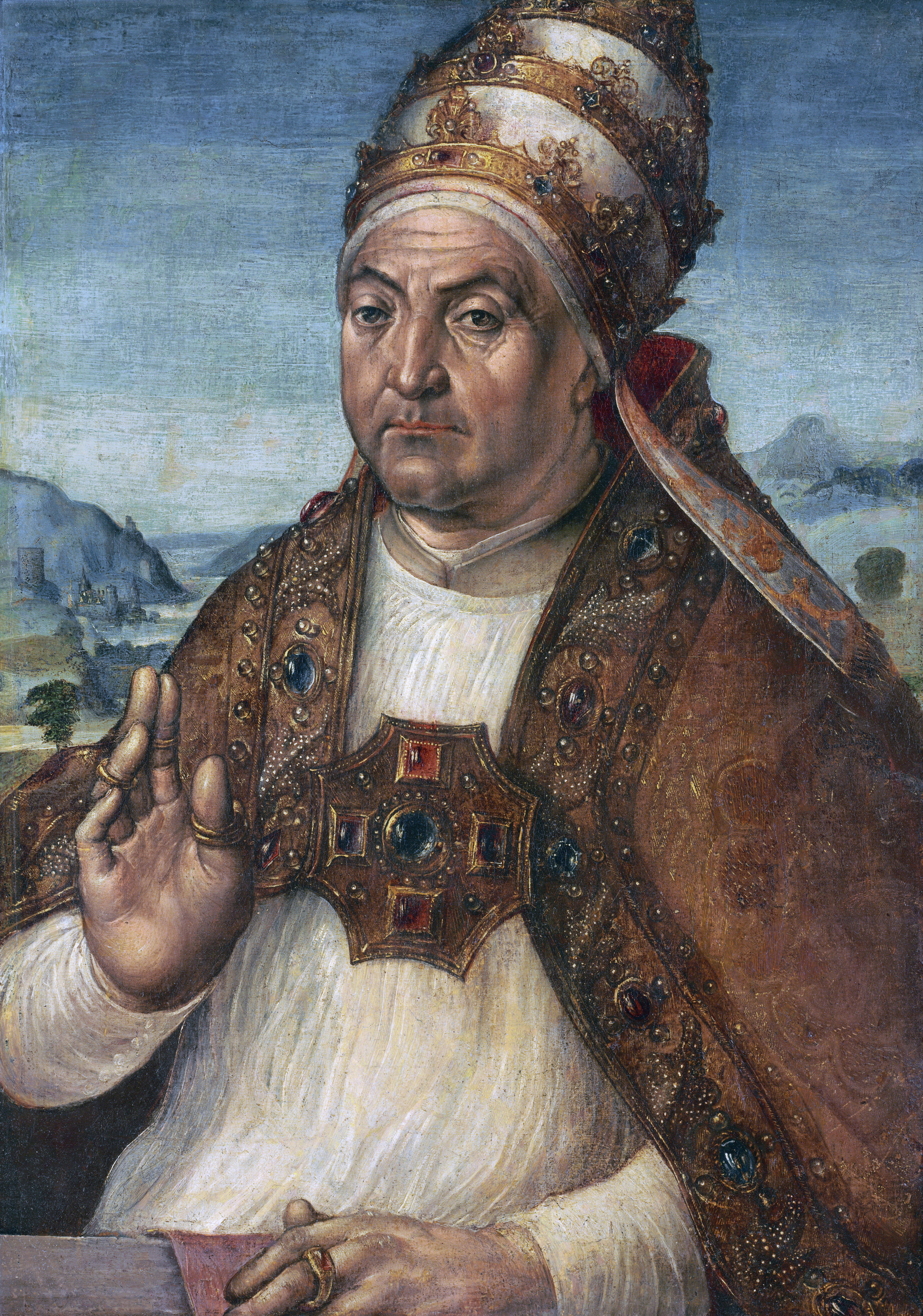
Sixtus IV, second Franciscan pope

- Pasteur de Sarrats (d. 1356)
- Fortanerius Vassalli (d. 1361)
- Guillaume Farinier (d. 1361)
- Marcus of Viterbo (d. 1369)
- Thomas of Frignano (d. 1381)
- Hélie de Bourdeilles (d. 1484)
- Francisco Jiménez de Cisneros (d. 1517)
- Cristoforo Numai (d. 1528)
- Francisco de Quiñones (d. 1540)
- Lorenzo Cozza (d. 1729)
- Cirilo de Alameda y Brea (d. 1872)
- Juan Landázuri Ricketts (d. 1997)
- Bernardino Echeverría Ruiz (d. 2000)
- Aloísio Lorscheider
- László Paskai (d. 2015)
- Alexandre José Maria dos Santos (d. 2021)
- Carlos Amigo Vallejo (d. 2022)
- Cláudio Hummes (d. 2022)
- Wilfrid Napier (born 1941)
- Leonardo Ulrich Steiner (born 1950)
- Luis Cabrera Herrera (born 1955)
- Jaime Spengler (born 1960)
- Pierbattista Pizzaballa (born 1965)

==== Popes ====
- Pope Nicholas IV (d. 1292)
- Pope Sixtus IV (d. 1484)
- Pope Sixtus V (d. 1590)

=== Scholars ===
==== Anthropologists ====
- Niccolò da Poggibonsi (d. unknown, late 14th cent.)
- Pedro Simón (d. 1628)
- José Arlegui (d. 1750)
- Gerónimo Boscana (d. 1831)

==== Historians ====
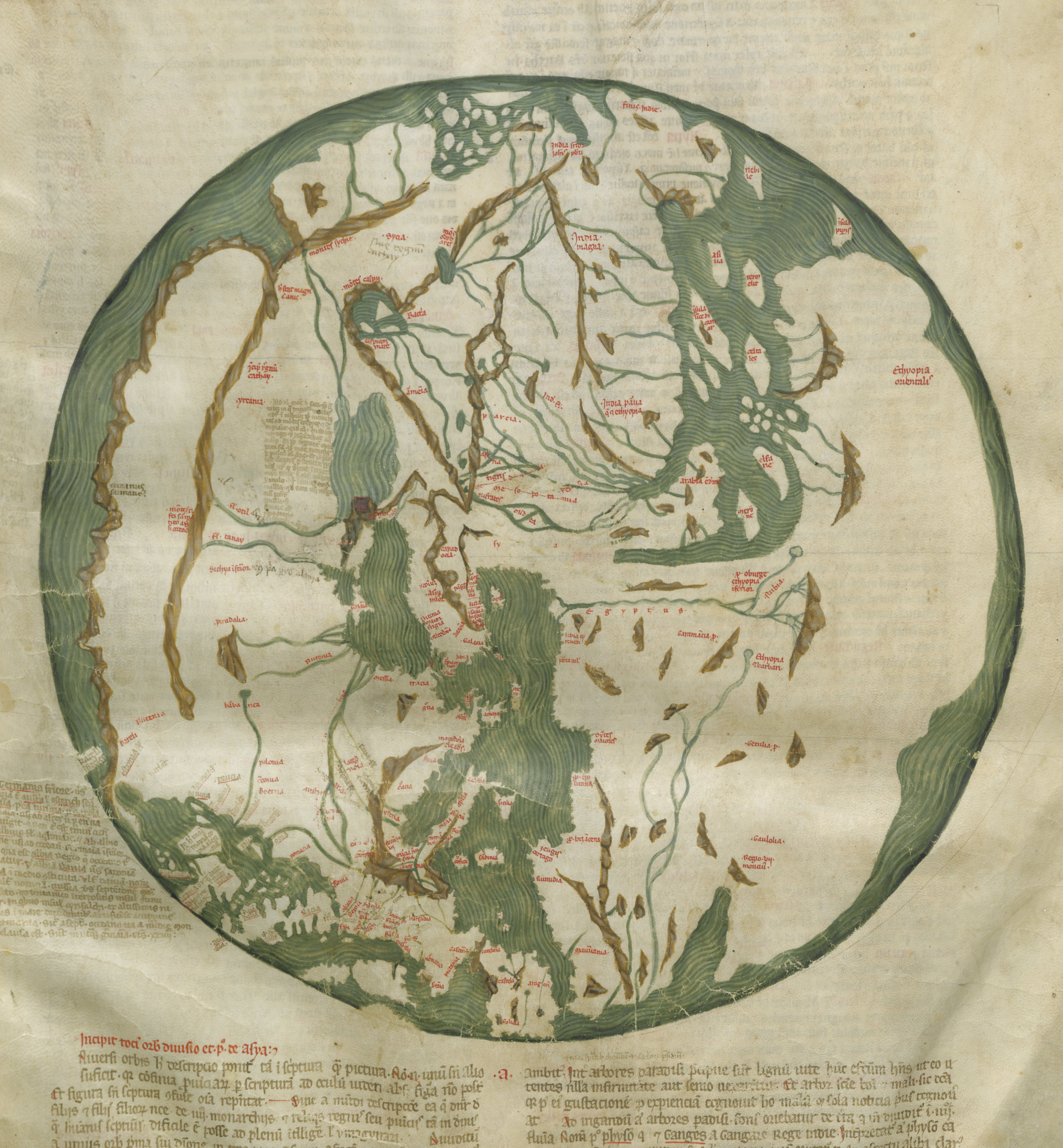
Paolino Veneto's map of the world from his Compendium (BNF lat. 4939)

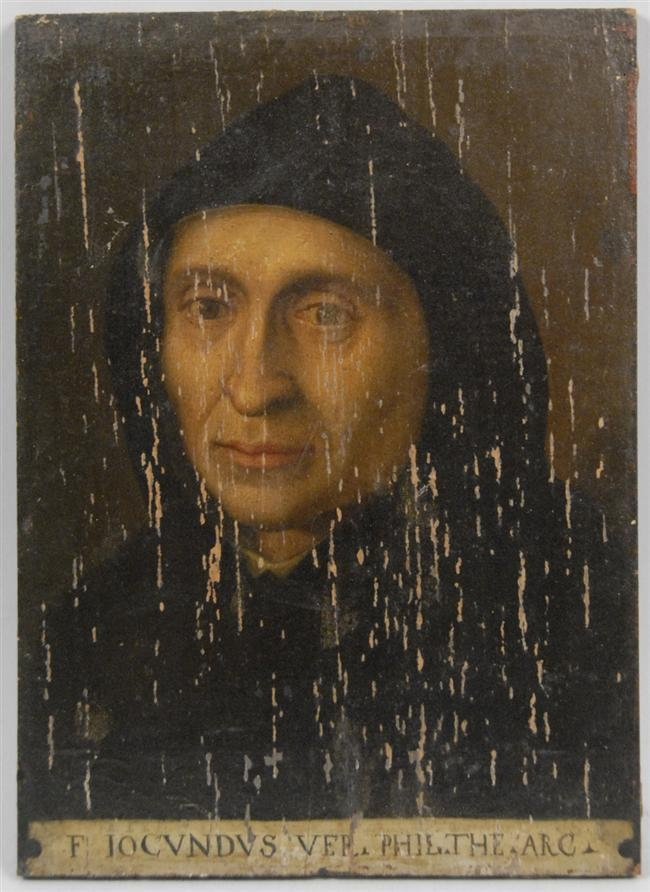
Giovanni Giocondo

- Albert of Stade (d. 1260)
- Thomas Tuscus (d. 1282)
- Salimbene di Adam (d. c.1290)
- Paolino Veneto (d. 1344)
- Giovanni Giocondo (d. 1515)
- Henricus Sedulius (d. 1621)
- Patrick Fleming (d. 1631)
- Aodh Buidhe Mac an Bhaird (d. 1635)
- Luke Wadding (d. 1657)
- John Colgan (d. 1658)
- Diogo das Chagas (d. 1661)
- Martin Valvekens (d. 1682)
- Francis Harold (d. 1685)
- Anthony Parkinson (d. 1728)
- Pamfilo of Magliano (d. 1876)
- Marin Sirdani (d.1962)
- Maynard Geiger (d. 1977)
- Bazilije Pandžić (d.2019)

==== Philosophers and theologians ====
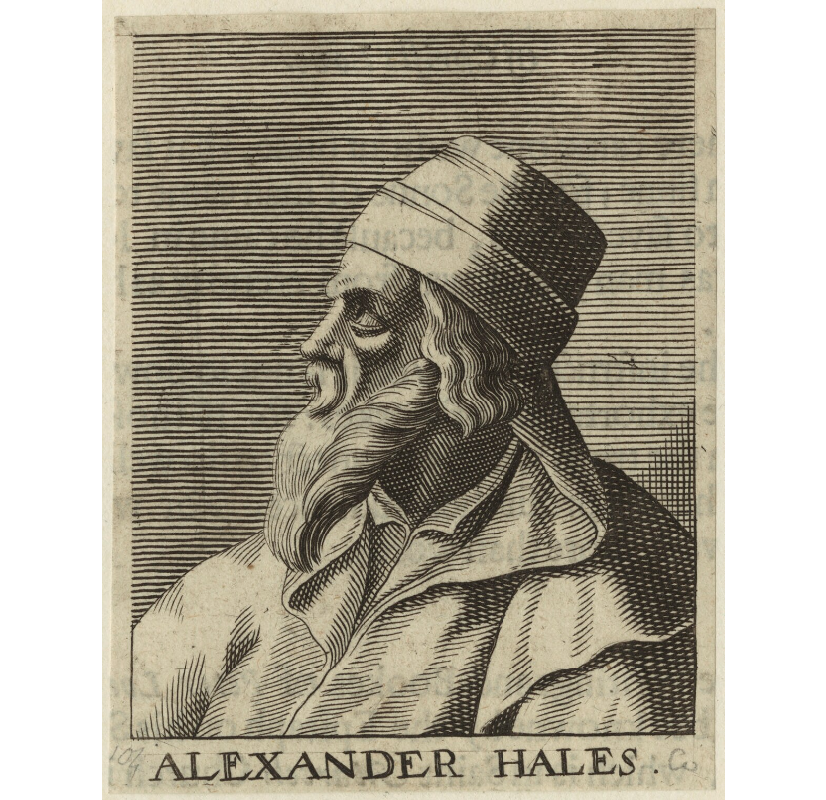
Alexander of Hales

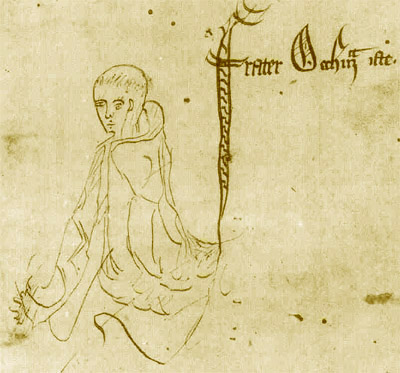
William of Ockham

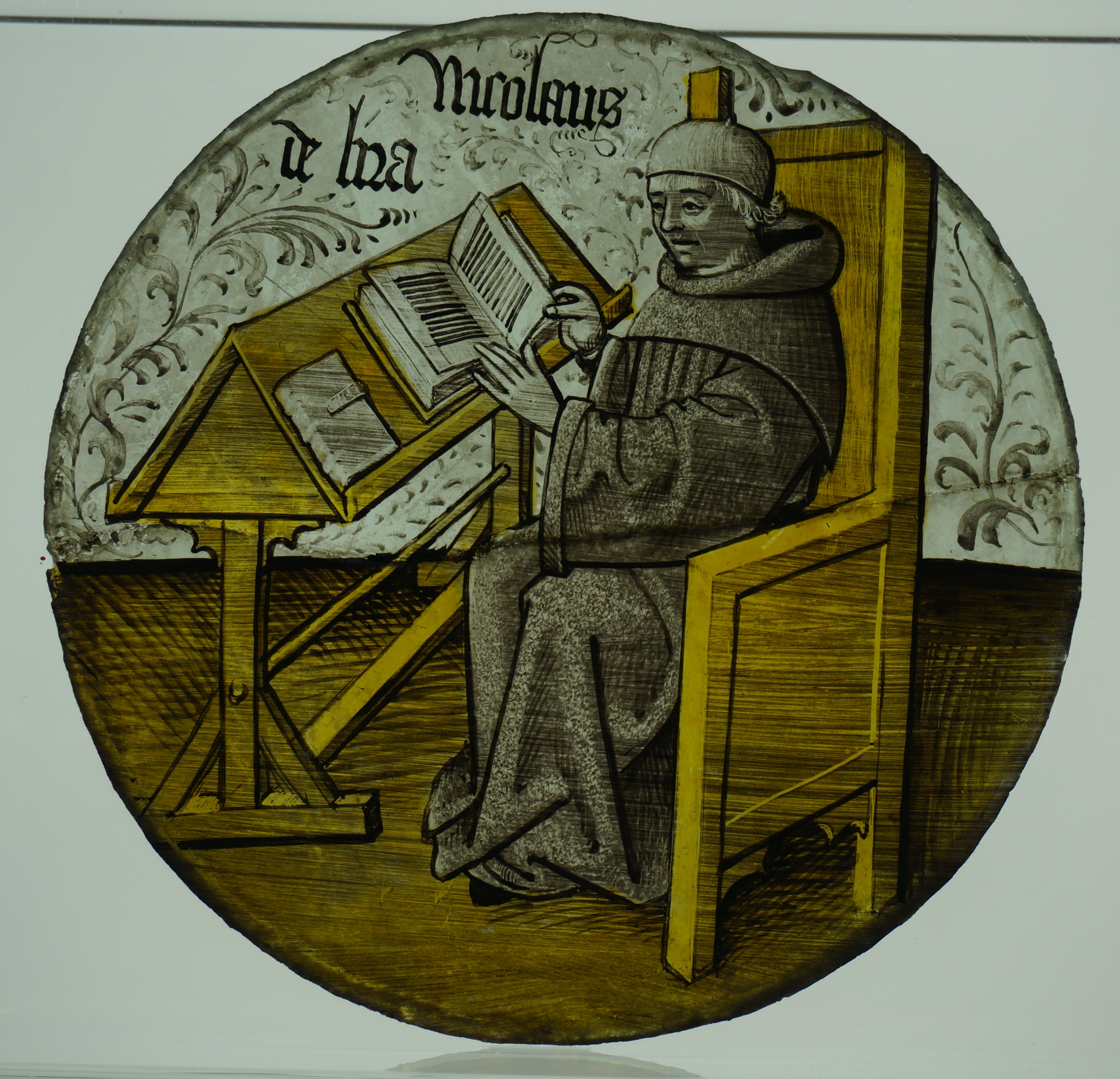
Nicholas of Lyre

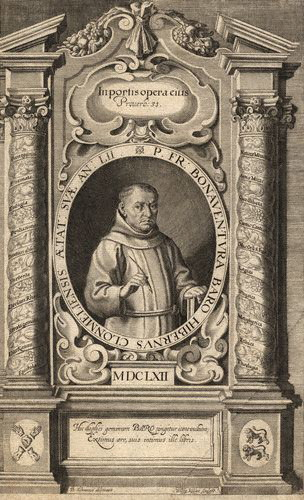
Bonaventure Baron, O.F.M.

- Haymo of Faversham (d. 1244)
- Alexander of Hales (d. 1245)
- John of Rupella (d. 1245)
- John of La Rochelle (d. 1245)
- Hugh of Digne (d. 1285)
- Matthew of Aquasparta (d. 1289)
- John Pecham (d. 1292)
- Richard of Middleton (d. c. 1300)
- John Marchesinus (d. unknown, early 14th century)
- Petrus Aureoli (d. 1322)
- Francis Mayron (d. 1327)
- William of Ockham (d. 1347)
- Nicholas of Lyra (d. 1349)
- Peter of Aquila (d. 1361)
- Arnald of Sarrant (d. 1382 or later)
- Francesc Eiximenis (d. 1409)
- Robert Colman (d. 1428)
- Robert de Finingham (d. 1460)
- Nicolas d'Orbellis (d. 1475)
- François Rabelais (d. 1553)
- Jean Benedicti
- François Feuardent (d. 1610)
- John Barnewall (d. 1650)
- Francis Bermingham (d. after 1652)
- Juan Bautista
- John Punch (d. 1661)
- Pedro d'Alva y Astorga (d. 1667)
- Mathias Hauzeur (d. 1676)
- Peter Valesius Walsh (d. 1688)
- Bonaventure Baron (d. 1696)
- Anton Harapi (d. 1946)
- Herman Van Breda (d. 1974)

==== Scientists, polymaths, and mathematicians ====
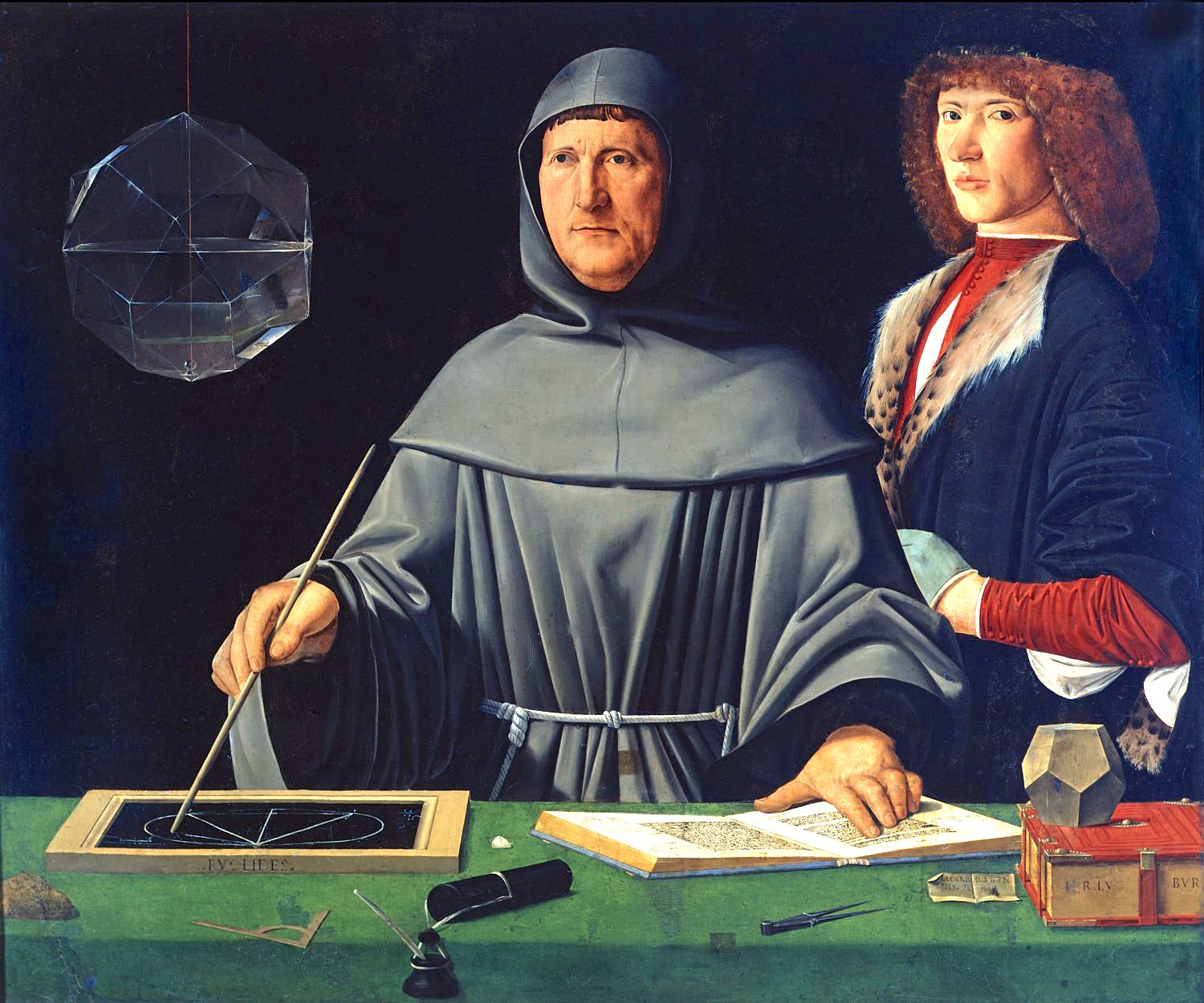
Fra Pacioli and his collaborator Leonardo da Vinci

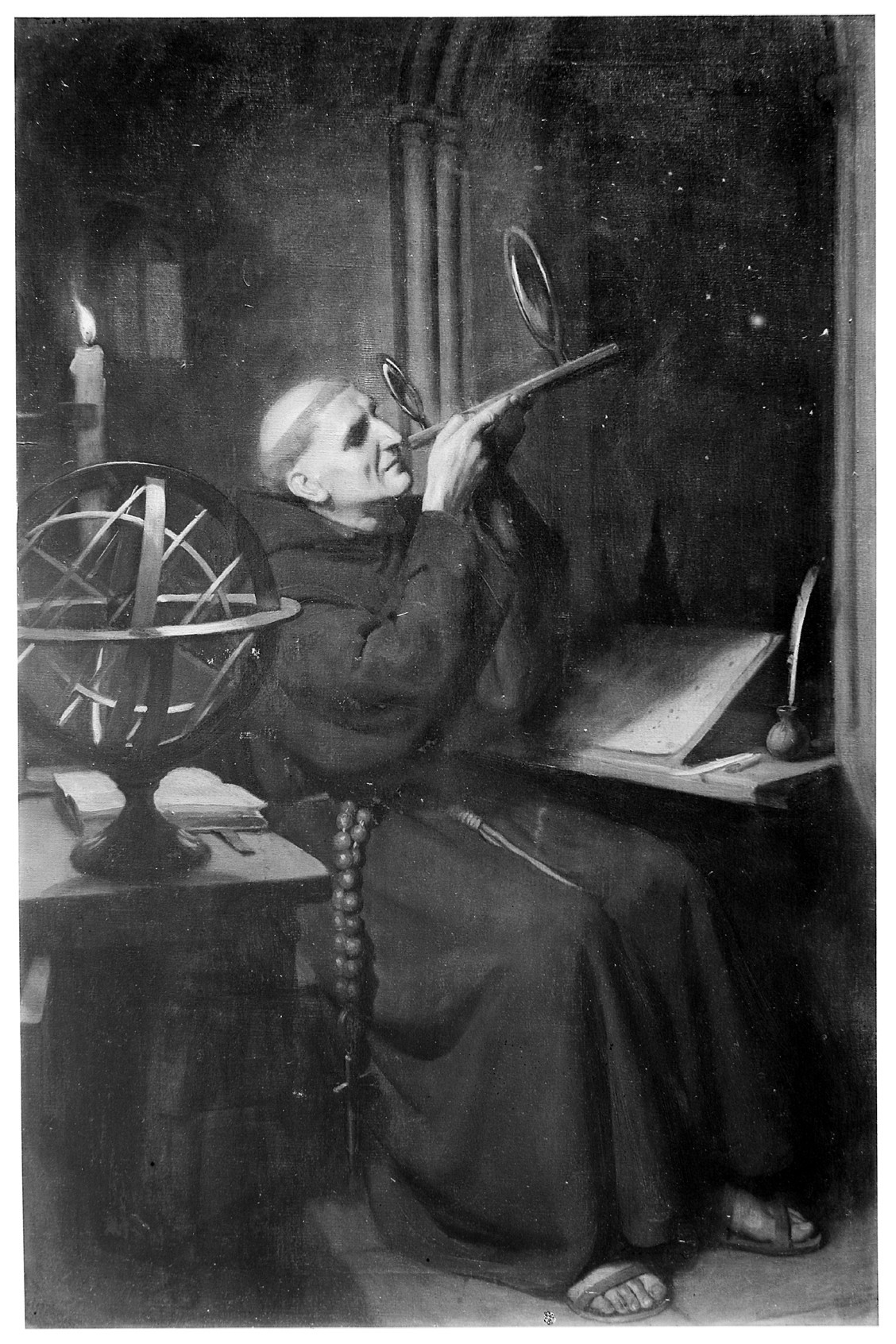
Friar Bacon in his observatory at Merton College

- Pedro Gallego (d. 1276)
- Roger Bacon, key father of modern empirical science (d. c. 1292)
- Vitello (d. unclear, 1280 or 1314)
- Juan Gil de Zamora (d. 1320)
- William of Ockham (d. 1347)
- Giovanni di Casali (d. after 1374)
- Berthold Schwarz (d. unknown, late 14th cent)
- Luca Pacioli (d. 1517)
- Juan Bermudo, mathematician, composer, and musician (d. 1565)
- Vincenzo Coronelli (d. 1718)
- José Torrubia (d. 1761)

==== Orientalists ====
- Ludovico Marracci (d. 1700)
- Jean-Mohammed Abd-el-Jalil (d. 1979)
- Giulio Basetti-Sani (d. 2001)

=== Spiritual writers ===
- Bonaventure, early Franciscan scholar, saint (Feast 15th July), and Doctor of the Church (d. 1274)
- Thomas of Celano (d. 1265)
- Thomas of Hales (d. unknown, late 13th cent.)
- Ugolino Brunforte (d. 1409)
- Francesc Eiximenis (d. 1409)
- António das Chagas (d. 1682)
- Pál Bajai, 18th century friar and writer
- Richard Rohr (born 1943)
- Convent of the Cordeliers of Nantes

== See also ==
- List of ministers general of the Order of Friars Minor
- Association of Franciscan Colleges and Universities
