= Angelo of Tolentino =

Angelo of Tolentino was a 13th-century Franciscan missionary.

== Life ==
He was jailed for excessive condemnation of luxury and after being released through the intervention of Raymond Godefroy, a new minister general who sympathized with the Spiritualists, he traveled with Angelo da Clareno, Marco da Montelupone, Pietro da Macerata, and Thomas of Tolentino to missionize in Lesser Armenia in 1289.
