= Thomas of Tolentino =

Italian Franciscan missionary and martyr

Saint Thomas of Tolentino OFM

Martyr
- Born: c. 1255; Tolentino, Ancona, Papal States
- Died: 8 April 1321; Thane, Delhi Sultanate
- Venerated in: Roman Catholic Church
- Beatified: Pre-congregation; confirmed 1809 and 1894
- Major shrine: Tolentino, Italy; Shenzhen, Quanzhou, China
- Feast: 9 April

Thomas of Tolentino, OFM (Italian: Tommaso di or da Tolentino; c. 1255 – 8 April 1321) was an Italian Franciscan missionary who was martyred with his three companions in Thane, India, for blaspheming Muhammad. His relics were removed to Quanzhou, China, and Tolentino, Italy, by Odoric of Pordenone. Venerated as a saint, his feast day falls on 9 April.

== Life ==
Thomas was born in Tolentino in the March of Ancona within the Papal States around 1250 to 1260. Becoming a Franciscan early in life, he developed a reputation for his strict adherence to its rule, particularly concerning his vow of poverty. A fellow of St Nicholas of Tolentino and one of Angelo da Clareno's Spiritual Franciscans, Thomas was jailed twice for his excessive condemnation of luxury.

After being released through the intervention of Raymond Godefroy, a new minister general who sympathized with the Spiritualists, Thomas traveled with Angelo da Clareno, Marco da Montelupone, Pietro da Macerata, and Angelo da Tolentino to mission in Lesser Armenia in 1289. In 1291, its King Haython II directed him to return to the courts of Rome, Paris, and London to seek help against his Muslim foes. His efforts to raise a new crusade were unsuccessful and he returned east, departing a second time to gather more missionaries. Returning with twelve companions in 1302, he worked in Armenia and Persia. He debated Armenian Christians he considered heretics at Sis in 1305 and participated in the Council of Sis that notionally reunited the Armenian and Roman Catholic churches in 1307. While in Persia, two letters dated 1305 and 1306 arrived from John of Montecorvino, the Franciscan missionary to China, and Thomas again traveled to Europe, delivering the correspondence to Rome in 1307. While there, he addressed a public consistory of the pope and cardinals, praising John's work in China and asking for assistance in developing his mission. He also discussed the matter with Clement V at Poitiers in 1308, after which an ecclesiastical hierarchy was established for the Roman Catholics in China. The pontiff named John as Archbishop of Khanbaliq (now within modern Beijing) and seven Franciscan bishops and many friars were sent to join him. Only three of the bishops and a few friars, however, successfully completed the journey. Thomas seems to have then travelled a fourth time to Armenia and Persia.

There is a gap until 1320, during which Thomas may have labored in India or China. In 1320, Thomas left from Hormuz with his fellow Franciscans Bl. James of Padua and Peter of Siena, the Dominican Jordan of Severac, and the layman Demetrio da Tifliz. A Georgian or Armenian, Demetrius was proficient at languages and served as the group's interpreter. A storm forced the party to land at Thane on Salsette Island near Mumbai in India, en route and were greeted by local Christians of the Church of the East. (Note: Another account exists which claims they had arrived at Diu intending to missionize at Columbum and had travelled to Thane on foot.) Jordan left them to preach at Bharuch, reaching Sopara (see Sopara in history) before he heard Demetrius and the Franciscans had been arrested. The family with whom they were staying had fallen into a quarrel and the husband had beaten his wife. When she went to the qadi to report this abuse, she had mentioned the four clerics as witnesses and they were called before him. Thomas, James, and Demetrius had gone to the court while Peter remained behind to look after their things. Having begun a discussion of religion, the qadi had asked them their opinion of Muhammad and Thomas replied bluntly that he was "the son of perdition and had his place in Hell with the Devil his father". At this, the Muslims around the court called for their death for blasphemy. Some accounts claim they were scourged and tortured before their execution by beheading on 8 April 1321. (Note: Some sources mistakenly list the date as 9 April or the year as 1322.) Peter was killed three days later.

== Legacy ==
The local Christians may have buried Thomas and his companions, but Jordanus Catalani, arriving too late to save them, removed their bodies to the church at Supera with the help of a Genovese youth. In 1323 or 1326, Odoric of Pordenone passed through the region. Having learned about Thomas and his companions, he took their relics with him to Quanzhou in Fujian. Thomas's skull he took with him to Khanbaliq and thence back to Europe, where he bestowed it on the Franciscan chapter in Tolentino in 1330. It was later moved to the town's cathedral by a Pisan merchant in the late 14th century, who erected a chapel there in the martyr's honor with the approval of Boniface IX. It is now kept in the central cathedral in a silver bust.

Thomas and his companions have been unofficially reckoned beatified since the 14th century. Jordan claimed to have miraculously healed the dysentery of his Genovese companion with one of Thomas's teeth. Thomas's cult was approved by Pius VII in 1809 and again by Leo XIII in 1894. He is venerated as a saint, sometimes together with his companions as the Four Martyrs of Thane, on 9 April.

== See also ==
- Other saints Thomas
