= Pál Bajai =

18th century Hungarian Franciscan friar

Pál Bajai, OFM, was a Hungarian Franciscan friar of the Observant reform and spiritual writer during the 18th century. His only surviving work is De gratiis atque beneficiis beatissimae V. Mariae Reginae in Ungaria (On the Favors and Blessings of the Most Blessed Virgin Mary, Queen of Hungary), published in 1766.

== Sources ==
- Szinnyei, József (2000), Magyar írók élete és munkái [Life and Works of Hungarian Writers] (in Hungarian), Budapest: Arcanum, ISBN 978-9638602992
