= Mark of Montelupone =

Mark of Montelupone or Marco da Montelupone (born in the mid-13th century) was a medieval Christian Franciscan missionary. He was among a group of included friars imprisoned for their extreme views.

== Life ==
Probably born in Montelupone, where there had been a Franciscan monastery since the papacy of Pope Innocent IV, he is first known as part of a group of friars in the Marche who were sentenced to life imprisonment by their superiors in the years following 1281. He was one of those who were condemned for heresy and insubordination for their devotion to the ideal of poverty first promulgated by Saint Francis – others included the Tramondo brothers, Thomas of Tolentino and Pietro da Macerata. However, they were then freed by Raymond Gaufridi, general minister, who sent them on a mission to Lesser Armenia after a request for some monks from Hethum II, King of Armenia.

He and Thomas were the two brothers chosen by Hethum towards the end of 1291 as envoys to Pope Nicholas IV, Philip V of France and Edward I of England to request aid against the Saracen advance. They first went to the pope, who gave them special letters for each of the two kings, then to Philip. They arrived in Paris whilst the general chapter of the Franciscans was in session and on 25 May 1292 the letter from Hethum was read out. After their embassy to France and England, there is no further evidence for Marco's life and his date of death is unknown.
