= Conrad of Offida =

Italian Friar Minor preacher

Blessed Conrad of Offida
- Born: c. 1241; Offida, Ancona
- Died: 12 December 1306; Umbria
- Venerated in: Roman Catholicism
- Beatified: 1817 by Pius VII
- Major shrine: Cathedral of Perugia
- Feast: December 19 (Franciscan Calendar)

Conrad of Offida (c. 1241 - 12 December 1306) was an Italian Friar Minor preacher and founder of the Celestines.

== Biography ==
Conrad was born at Offida, a little town in the March of Ancona, c. 1241. When barely fourteen years old he entered the Order of Friars Minor at Ascoli, and was making rapid progress in the study of sacred sciences, when an internal voice called him to humbler offices of the religious life. He therefore abandoned his studies with the consent of his superiors, and for many years was employed as cook and questor.

His superiors subsequently had him ordained and sent him forth to preach. Conrad proved himself an excellent preacher in various convents, among them Rivotorto, Sirolo, Forano, and La Verna. He modelled his life after that of Francis of Assisi. He was especially zealous for the observance of poverty. During his long religious life he always wore the same habit and always walked without sandals.

The early legend declares that Conrad's guardian angel was the same that had formerly fulfilled this office for Francis of Assisi, and that Giles of Assisi came back to earth to teach him the mysteries of contemplation. He was a close friend of Leo of Assisi, the companion and confessor of Francis of Assisi, who when dying, entrusted Conrad with his writings. Conrad was allied with Angelo da Clareno and with John of La Penna, John of Parma, Peter of John Olivi, Peter of Monticello and others of the "Spirituals".

In 1294 he obtained permission from pope Celestine V to separate from the main body of the order and found the Celestines by whom the rule of St. Francis was observed in all its purity. When this congregation was suppressed by Boniface VIII, Conrad immediately returned under the authority of the superiors of the order. The letter written in 1295 by Peter of John Olivi to Conrad in which the legitimacy of Boniface VIII's election is defended, has been edited by Ignatius Jeiler (Historisches Jahrbuch, III, 649).

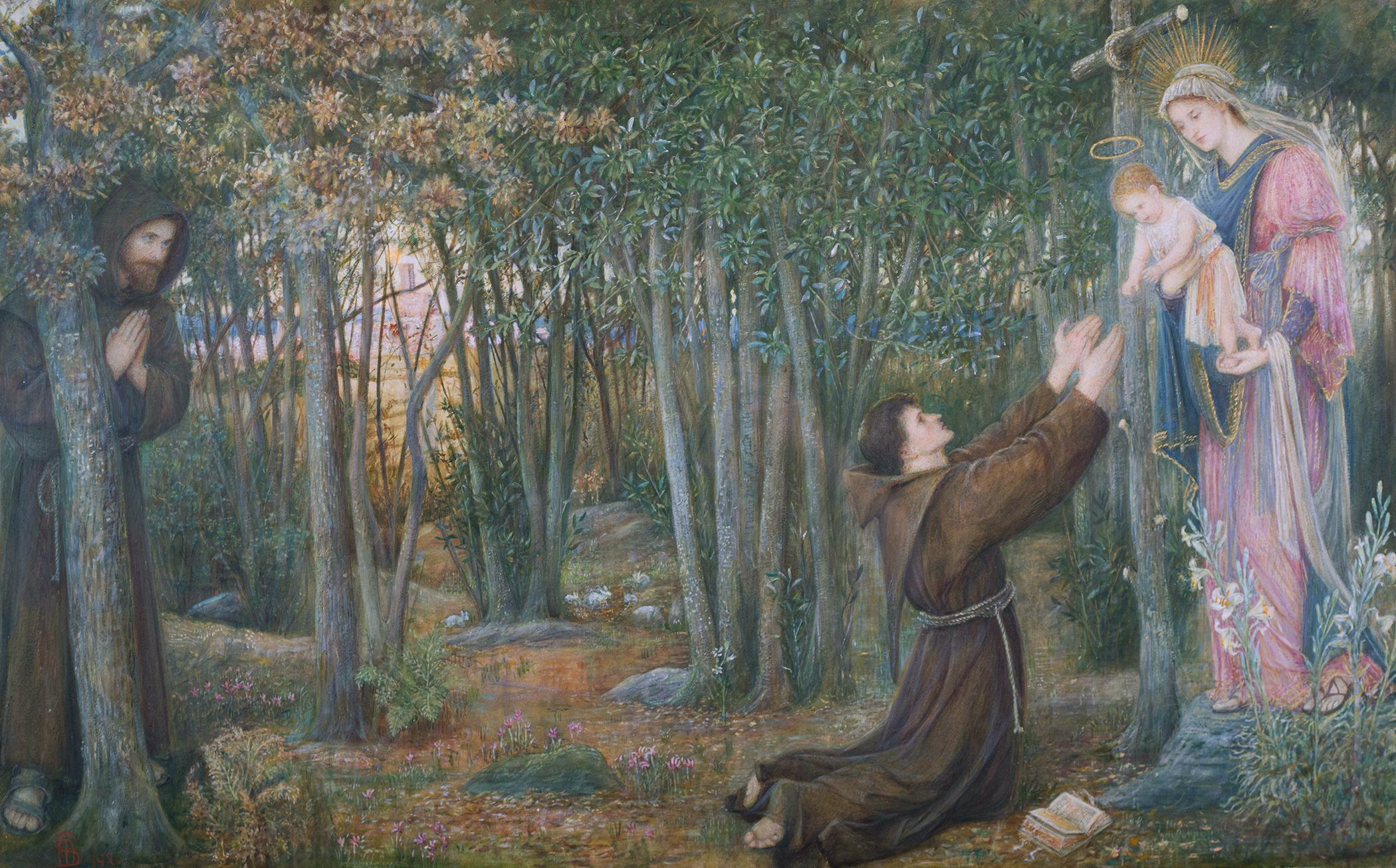
How the Virgin Came to Brother Conrad in Offia and Laid her Son in his Arms, by Marie Spartali Stillman (1892)

During a course of missions he was giving at Bastia in Umbria, he died on 12 December 1306 at the age of about sixty-five years and was buried in that place.

== Veneration ==
Fifty-six years later his remains were carried off by the Perugians and buried at San Francesco in the Oratory of San Bernardino, reposing beside those of Giles of Assisi in the choir of the cathedral at Perugia.

Pope Pius VII beatified Conrad in 1817.

His liturgical feast is kept in the Order of Friars Minor on 19 December.
