= Anthony Parkinson =

English Franciscan friar and historian (1667–1728)

Anthony Parkinson (1667 – 30 January 1728) was an English Franciscan friar and historian of his Order.

== Life ==
Born in England, as a young man Parkinson left for the continent, where he entered the Order of Friars Minor, still banned in his homeland. In 1692 he was appointed professor of philosophy at the Franciscan community in Douai; the following year he was approved for preaching and hearing confessions. He returned to England to serve its Catholic population in 1695 and was president of the friars in Warwick 1698–1701, of Birmingham 1701–10, and Definitor of the restored English province 1707–10. Parkinson was also the nominal guardian of the friars in Worcester 1704–7, and those of Oxford for 1710–1713. He then led the still-hidden province as Minister Provincial until 1716, and again 1722–25. As such he assisted at the General Chapter of the Order held in Rome in May 1723.

Parkinson's chief work is the Collectanea Anglo-Minoritica, or a Collection of the Antiquities of the English Franciscans, or Friars Minors, commonly called Gray Friars, in two parts, with an appendix concerning the English Poor Clares, published in quartos in London in 1726. There are also extant some unedited manuscripts.

Parkinson died in England on 30 January 1728.
