= Pietro Caperolo =

Franciscan preacher

Pietro Caperolo (date of birth unknown; d. at Velletri in 1480) was an Italian Franciscan preacher.

== Life ==
He was known as a preacher in Brescia, Velletri, and other cities of Northern Italy. Caperolo played an important part in the religious disturbances, which arose about the year 1475, between the Franciscan provinces of Milan and Venice, and which were occasioned in great measure by the war then going on between Milan and the Venetian Republic.

Caperolo succeeded in obtaining permission from Pope Sixtus IV to separate several convents of the Venetian province from the obedience of the Observants, and to form a vicariate, which was placed under the obedience of the Conventuals, but retained the right to elect its own provincial superior. The members of the new congregation were known as Caperolani.

The death of Caperolo, however, put an end to the Caperolani as a distinct branch within the order, and the members of the new vicariate returned to the obedience of the Observants.
