= Melchor Oyanguren de Santa Inés =

Title page of Arte de la lengua japona (1738)

Melchor Oyanguren de Santa Inés (1688–1747) was a Spanish Basque Franciscan missionary and linguist who served in Asia and North America. He wrote grammars of Japanese (1738) and Tagalog (1742).

Oyanguren was born in 1688 in Salinas de Léniz (Leintz Gatzaga) in the province of Guipúzcoa (Gipuzkoa), Spain. As a young man, he joined the Discalced Franciscans. He went to the Philippines in 1717 intending to go on to Japan, but the Japanese policy of Sakoku severely restricted entry to foreigners and he was unable. He went to Cochinchina and Cambodia instead. Poor health brought about his return to Spain. In 1721 he left for Mexico, but pastoral duties brought him to the Philippines again in 1723 or 1725. Between 1726 and 1736 he was the teacher (doctrinero) and minister of the village of Los Baños de Aguas Santas. In 1736 he went to Mexico, preparing to return to Spain on account of his health. Instead he stayed to succeed the recently deceased president of the convent of San Agustín de las Cuevas. He died in his post in Mexico in 1747.

Oyanguren was familiar with a large number of typologically divergent languages. Besides his native Basque, he also acquired Spanish (in which he published), Greek, Hebrew and Latin in Europe. In the Philippines, he learned besides Tagalog and Japanese, also Chinese, Vietnamese and Malay. He also learned Nahuatl in Mexico. He was one of the first linguists to distinguish suffixation from inflection. He provides unique comparisons between agglutinative languages like Basque and Japanese and an isolating language like Chinese.

Oyanguren's descriptive grammars, Arte de la lengua japona (1738) and Tagalysmo elucidado y reducido (1742), both published in Mexico, were not well received at the time of publication. Copies of the Arte de la lengua japona are very rare, but a modern edition was printed in 2009. Tagalysmo was his second Tagalog grammar. His first was published in Latin in 1723. Since it was not well received, he rewrote it in Spanish. Oyanguren also wrote two grammars of Basque, both now lost: Arte de la lengua Vascongada (date unknown) and El Cantabrismo elucidado (1715). His trilingual dictionary of Basque, Spanish and Tagalog is also thought to be lost.

== Works ==
- Melchor Oyanguren de Santa Inés, Otto Zwartjes (ed.). Arte de la lengua japona (1738). Iberoamericana, 2009.
- Melchor Oyanguren de Santa Inés. Tagalysmo elucidado y reducido a la latinidad de Lebrija. 1742.
