= Raymond Gaufredi =

Raymond Gaufredi (died 1310), sometimes anglicized as Raymond Godefroy, was Minister General of the Franciscan Order from 1289 to 1295.

== Life ==
Raymond Gaufredi was born in Marseille. A sympathizer with the Franciscan Spirituals, he became Minister General of the Order of Friars Minor in 1289. Despite Pope Nicholas IV having been the first Franciscan pope, it was not until his death in 1292 that Gaufredi felt able to relax the sanctions against the Spirituals, who had been persecuted for their strong condemnations of luxury in the church. Gaufredi was responsible in particular for the release from prison of Roger Bacon. Angelo da Clareno and some of his followers—including St Thomas of Tolentino—were released from confinement and sent as missionaries to Armenia in order to avoid persecution from the friars in the March of Ancona. He nominated Pierre Jean Olivi for a teaching position at the University of Montpellier.

Gaufredi was also a supporter of the Franciscan tertiary Ramón Llull, and in 1290 gave him a letter of recommendation permitting Llull to teach in Italian monasteries. He was deposed as Minister General by Pope Boniface VIII, in 1295.

Some alchemical writings have been attributed to him.

Catholic Church titles
Preceded by Matthew of Aquasparta	Minister General of the Order of Friars Minor; 1289–1295	Succeeded by Giovanni Minio de Murovalle
