= Angelo Clareno =

Italian priest

Angelo Clareno (1247/1248 – 15 June 1337), also known as Angelus Clarenus, was the founder and leader of one of the groups of Fraticelli in the early 14th century.

== Life ==
Originally known as Pietro da Fossombrone, he was born about 1248, and entered the Franciscan order around 1270. Believing that the rule of St Francis was not being observed and interpreted according to the mind and spirit of the Seraphic Father, he retired to a hermitage with a few companions and formed a new branch of the order known as the "Clareni". The influence of the prophetical writings of Joachim of Floris, a Calabrian abbot, on Angelo and his followers, and in fact on the "Spirituals" generally of the thirteenth century, cannot be overrated.

By the Bull of Pope Sixtus IV, titled Dominus Noster Jesus Christus, the "Clareni" were ordered to unite to the main body of the Franciscans and placed under the obedience of the Minister General. But the number of Angelo's followers was small; and his so-called reform brought upon himself in particular, and the "Clareni" in general, the suspicious disfavour of the Friars Minor who were not prepared to accept the extreme interpretation of the rule of St Francis which Angelo had adopted. The Provincial Minister had Angelo and a few other "zealot" leaders arrested in Rome as heretics and schismatics. They were imprisoned for nine years when in 1289, a new Provincial, Raymond Gaufredi ordered them released.

Fearing that to leave them in the March of Ancona would likely expose them to continued persecution, Gaufredi sent them to Armenia Minor (Cilicia), where the king had made a request to the Pope for the services of some friars to instruct the people. Angelo was sent, along with Tommaso da Tolentino, Marco da Montelupone, and Pietro da Macerata. Despite their success, or perhaps because of it, the friars in the province of Syria became jealous and agitated against the "zealots" who were exiled from Armenia towards the end of 1293.

The Conventual guardian at Acre summoned Angelo and Peter of Macerata to Cyprus in order that Angelo might clear his name preaching before the king and court. However, the guardian of Nicosia detained them as excommunicates. With their work in Armenia hampered they decided to return to Italy. However, the vicar of the Provincial of the Marche region let them know they were not welcome, so Guafredi and others, among them, Conrad of Offida, advised them to appeal to the new pope, Celestine V.

Celestine absolved them of their vows of obedience to their Franciscan superiors, and constituted them as a separate group of Poor Hermits who could live at the monasteries of the Celestines. He appointed Peter of Macerata as superior under the name of Brother Liberato. Celestine also named Cardinal Napoleone Orsini protector. Celestine was 79 when he became pope, and having little experience, proved relatively ineffectual, and resigned within six months. His immediate successors were less favorably disposed towards the new order. Upon the death of Liberato in 1307, Angelo became superior.

In 1311, he came to Avignon to answer a charge of heresy that had been brought against him. He was finally acquitted after a tedious and searching examination. Angelo left Avignon, at the end of 1312, to go to Majorca, where he stayed for almost two months, with the Prince Philip, son of James I of Majorca. He returned to Avignon in the spring of 1313, but faced with the hostility of the Franciscans of Tuscany, took refuge in Sicily, under the protection of Federico III of Aragon.

In 1317, Pope John XXII, in the bull Sancta Romana Ecclesia abolished all the dissident Franciscan groups. Angelo was then forced to join the congregation of Celestines, but the procurator of the Celestines refused to allow him to stay at the Celestine monasteries: he was instead welcomed by the Benedictine abbot Bartolomeo at the Sacro Speco di Subiaco. From there he sends circular letters to his friars who live in hermitages or scattered in convents.

In 1334, John XXII ordered the guardian of the convent of Ara Coeli in Rome to take possession of the person of Angelo. But Abbot Bartholomew refused to hand him over. Angelo was able to move from Subiaco, heading towards the Kingdom of Naples, where the presence of Philip of Majorca and Provencal and Catalan Spirituals at the court of Queen Sancia guaranteed continuous assistance.

Angelo was highly esteemed by the Augustinian Hermits, with whom he was on friendly terms, especially with Gentile da Foligno, socius of the prior general of the order, and Simone da Cassia, an ascetic writer of great repute. He corresponded with both, and, after the death of Angelo, Simone bitterly lamented the loss of a friend and spiritual adviser. It is likely that the Fraticelli whom Simone afterwards successfully defended against the Dominicans in the civil courts at Florence (c. 1355), where he was then preaching, were adherents of Clareno.

In 1337 he retired to the little hermitage of Santa Maria d'Aspro, near Marsicovetere in Basilicata, where he died.

== Works ==
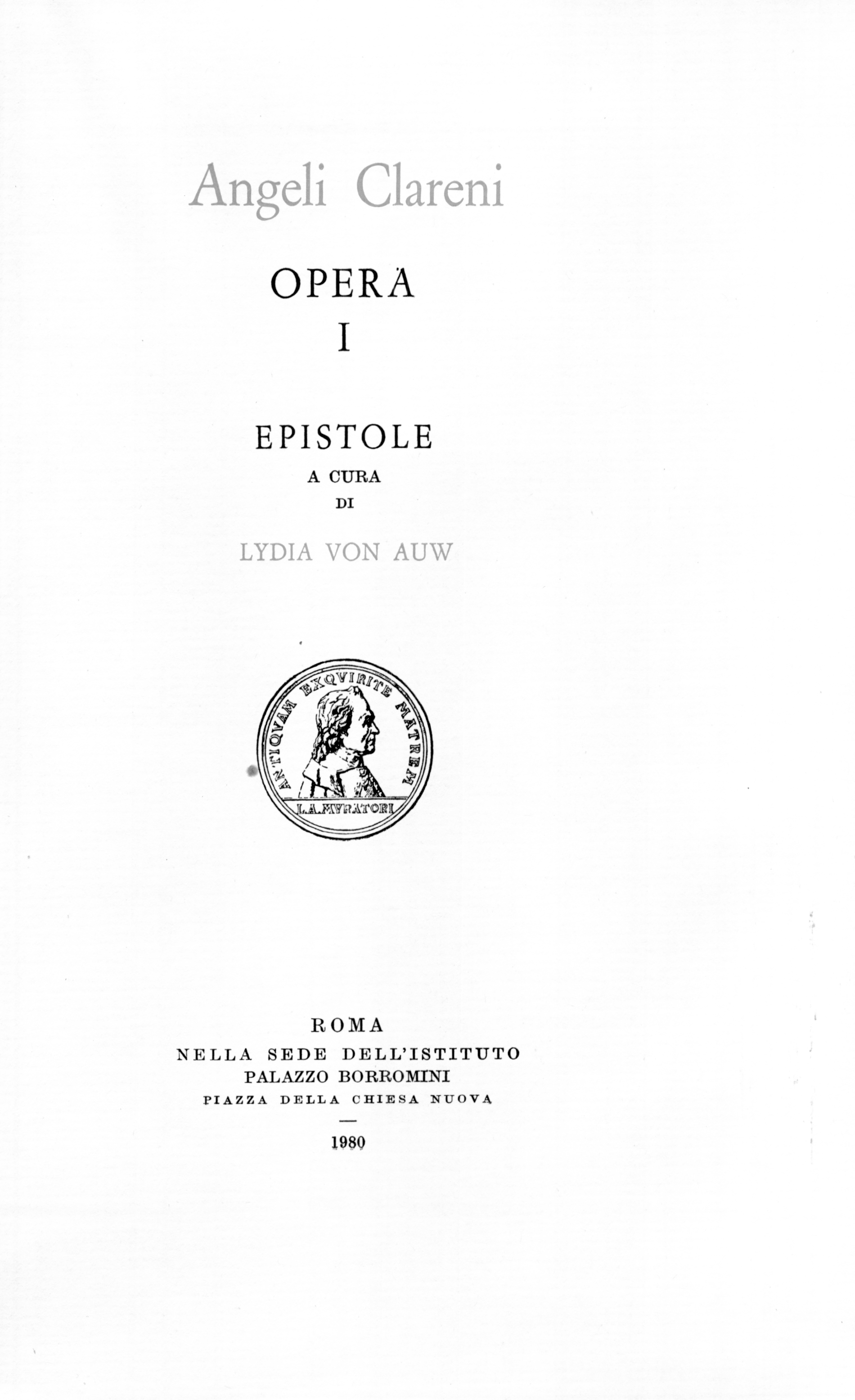
Epistole

Angelo Clareno is the author, at least in great part, of the Chronica septem tribulationum Ordinis Minorum, which records the persecutions suffered by the "Spirituals", beginning with the innovations made during St. Francis' sojourn in the East, and continuing under Elias, Crescentius, and Bonaventure. This work is characterized by heroic endurance; but is tinged with bias and bitterness. Another work of Angelo's that deserves mention is the Declaratio regulae Minorum.

Angelo Clareno ranks among the best medieval translators from Greek. His knowledge of Greek impressed his confrères so much that they believed it to have been miraculously infused. He translated from Greek into Latin the Rule of St. Basil, the Dialogue of St. Macharius and the Scala Paradisi of John Climacus. In his Expositio Regulae Fratrum Minorum (Quaracchi, 1912), he gives long extracts from Greek Fathers translated by him.

== See also ==
- Philip of Majorca

== Bibliography ==
- Angelo Clareno: A Chronicle or History of the Seven Tribulations of the Order of Brothers Minor, Franciscan Institute Publications, 2005. ISBN 978-1-57659-198-7
