= Pietro da Macerata =

Franciscan monk

Pietro da Macerata (d. 26 August 1307) was a Franciscan monk in the late 13th century. He was one of the founders, and later the head of the Fraticelli group, Pauperes eremitae, also known as the Pauperes Heremitae Domini Coelestini.

He was sent to Armenia with Angelo Clareno and four other monks by Raymond Gaufridi sometime after 1289. However, the hostility of the "fratres communes" forced Pietro da Macerata and Clareno to return to Italy, where they were refused by every abbey they approached. They met Pope Celestine V at L'Aquila - he split them from the Franciscans and set up a new order of "pauperes Eremitae" (poor hermits), to be resident in Celestine monasteries. Pietro then changed his name to "Fra Liberato".

The formation of the new order drew a hostile reaction from the "fratres communes", who even tried to kidnap Fra Liberato. After Celestine V's abdication, it was vulnerable and moved to Thessaly around 1298. Pope Boniface VIII remained hostile to it despite two embassies by Fra Liberato himself. Fra Liberato thus decided to return to Italy permanently to defend the order before Pope Benedict XI. However, the inquisitor Tomaso d'Aversa ordered his arrest and Fra Liberato was only able to escape him by retreating to the hermitage of San Angelo della Versa, where he died.

The Pauperes were excommunicated by John XXII in 1317.
