= Fraticelli =

Medieval Roman Catholic groups

The Fraticelli (Italian for “Little Brethren”) or Spiritual Franciscans were multiple Christian monastic sects who split from the Franciscan Order due to opposition to changes to the rule of Saint Francis of Assisi, especially with regard to poverty. They also regarded the wealth of the Catholic Church as scandalous, with the view that the riches of individual churchmen invalidated their status. The Fraticelli were declared heretical in 1296 by Pope Boniface VIII.

The Fraticelli appeared in the thirteenth, fourteenth and fifteenth centuries, principally in Italy, all having split from the Franciscan Order on account of the disputes concerning poverty. It is necessary to differentiate the various groups of Fraticelli, although the term may be applied to all. The primary groups were the Fraticelli de Paupere Vita and the Fraticelli de Opinione (also called Michaelites).

The Apostolics (also known as Pseudo-Apostles or Apostolic Brethren) are excluded from the category, because admission to the Order of Saint Francis was expressly denied to their founder, Gerard Segarelli. The Apostolics had no connection to the Franciscans, in fact desiring to exterminate them.

Umberto Eco's novel The Name of the Rose is set against the persecution of Fraticelli.

== Etymology ==
Fraticelli is a diminutive of the Italian frate (plural frati), itself derived from Latin Frater “brother”, often shortened to Fra when referring to members of religious orders.

Frati was a designation of the members of the mendicant orders founded during the thirteenth century, principally the Franciscans. The Latin term Fraterculus does not occur in historical records concerning the Fraticelli. Etymologically, the name Friars Minor (Fratres Minores) is equivalent to the diminutive Fraticellus. The ideal of the founder of the Friars Minor, Saint Francis of Assisi, was that his disciples, by evangelical poverty, complete self-denial, and humility, should lead the world back to Jesus Christ. The Italian people designated as Fraticelli all the members of religious orders (particularly mendicants), and especially hermits, whether these observed monastic precepts or regulated their own lives.

The term "Fraticelli" appears in source material between the 13th and 14th centuries, generally used as a popular or derogatory label for religious individuals who lived in poverty and eremitism outside the hierarchy of the Catholic Church. Its first formal appearance in a papal document occurs in the bull Sancta Romana, issued by John XXII on 30 December 1317, which condemned "nonnulli viri prophane multitudinis qui vulgariter Fraticelli seu fratres de paupere vita [...]". From then on, the term was incorporated into the legal language of the Curia, although the bull also cited other names—such as Bizzochi or Beghini—and referred to various regions extending from Italy to Provence, indicating that the word did not yet designate a specific group.

In Franciscan sources of the period, "Fraticelli" was not a name chosen by the religious themselves, but one imposed externally. A famous example is Michele da Calci, who, according to the chronicle of his martyrdom, protested against the sentence declaring him a "heretic of the Fraticelli of the poor life," stating: "I know not what Fraticelli you speak of: I am a Friar Minor of Saint Francis who observes the rule". This rejection highlights the tension between the identity attributed by the Inquisition and the self-identity assumed by those who considered themselves faithful to the charisma of Francis of Assisi. Angelo Clareno, a leading figure of the Spiritual movement in the March of Ancona, systematically avoided the use of the word. It never appears in his correspondence, as he preferred expressions such as fratres pauperes or pauperes humiles. The term appears only in his work Historia septem tribulationum, but always placed in the mouths of his opponents, such as Bonagrazia of Bergamo. For Clareno, "Fraticelli" was a polemical label used to criminalize radical poverty and frame it as heresy.

A different perspective is found in the vernacular letters of the Augustinian Gentile da Foligno, who was close to Clareno's circle. In a letter to Matteuccio da Gubbio, Gentile defends the "life of the Fraticelli" as an authentic following of the Gospel, arguing that John XXII's excommunication was not directed against them. He contended that the decretal applied only to those who founded new orders without permission, whereas the authentic Fraticelli had renounced offices, habits, and their proper names. For Gentile, the term takes on a positive moral value, describing humble Christians who follow the life of Christ in accordance with their human frailty.

As papal repression intensified, "Fraticelli" became a technical inquisitorial category. During the 1330s, letters from John XXII and Benedict XII mention the fraticelli de paupere vita settled in the March of Ancona, in towns such as Camerino, Fermo, Matelica, and San Ginesio. In these documents, the word specifically identifies the followers of Clareno, who was considered their leader (caput seu magister eorum). However, in local documentation, usage remained looser, sometimes being applied to simple hermits or penitents.

According to Lambertini, the evolution of the term reveals a constant ambiguity. Following the bull Sancta Romana, the word proved restrictive if limited strictly to heretical groups, yet overly broad in everyday speech. Modern historiography views the term not as designating a cohesive order or sect, but rather a constellation of groups bound by the desire to live the Gospel in absolute poverty. In the March of Ancona, the name was a contested concept: a tool to stigmatize dissenters and, at the same time, a mark of evangelical fidelity for those who embraced it from within.

== Background ==
The Spiritual Franciscanism refers to two related but distinct phenomena in the first two centuries of the history of the Franciscan movement: a broad and loosely defined current of radical evangelical poverty traceable to the lifetime of Francis of Assisi himself, and the Spiritual Franciscans (or Spirituals, from the Latin: Spirituales), a general term for several groups of Friars Minor active in the second half of the thirteenth and the beginning of the fourteenth centuries who claimed to observe the Rule in its original severity, in opposition to the main body of the order.

=== Early Spiritual Franciscanism ===
Early Franciscans were itinerant preachers, who, following their founder Francis of Assisi, took to heart Christ's injunction in Luke 9:2–3: “Take nothing for the journey – no staff, no bag, no bread, no money, no extra shirt.” But also:

- "Jesus said unto him, If thou wilt be perfect, go and sell that thou hast, and give to the poor, and thou shalt have treasure in heaven: and come and follow me." — Matthew 19:21
- "Then Jesus beholding him loved him, and said unto him, One thing thou lackest: go thy way, sell whatsoever thou hast, and give to the poor, and thou shalt have treasure in heaven: and come, take up the cross, and follow me." — Mark 10:21
- "Now when Jesus heard these things, he said unto him, Yet lackest thou one thing: sell all that thou hast, and distribute unto the poor, and thou shalt have treasure in heaven: and come, follow me." — Luke 18:22
- "And when they had brought their ships to land, they forsook all, and followed him." — Luke 5:11
- "And all that believed were together, and had all things common; And sold their possessions and goods, and parted them to all men, as every man had need." — Acts 2:44–45
- "Then said Jesus unto his disciples, If any man will come after me, let him deny himself, and take up his cross, and follow me." — Matthew 16:24
- "And when he had called the people unto him with his disciples also, he said unto them, Whosoever will come after me, let him deny himself, and take up his cross, and follow me." — Mark 8:34

Living by such a rule required constant begging for alms, and over time this produced tensions, both with potential benefactors faced with repeated appeals from mendicant friars, and with established monastic orders accustomed to aid from the same pool of benefactors.

Early Franciscan poverty, as lived under Francis himself, was an informal and largely unregulated practice, dependent on the personal authority of the founder rather than on legal or doctrinal formulations, and it posed no organised challenge to ecclesiastical or Franciscan authority because no rival institutional structure yet existed to oppose.

Even before Francis's death in 1226, two tendencies could already be distinguished within the fraternity: those who wished to mitigate the rigour of the rule of poverty and remodel the order into a more structured institution, and those later known as "Zealots" or "Spirituals," who wished to preserve the founder's original way of life unchanged. This latent division became increasingly visible as the Rule was progressively modified in the years following Francis's death, as the order grew from a small, close-knit fraternity into an institution that the Church increasingly called upon to supply bishops, university masters, and inquisitors — a transformation that put growing strain on the informal, charismatic style of life practised by the first companions.

=== The Spiritual Franciscans movement ===
The Spiritual Franciscans, by contrast, operated within an order that had by the late thirteenth century become a large, centralised institution with its own hierarchy, legal privileges, and papal protection; their insistence on absolute poverty was consequently articulated as a formal position, defended through appeals to the Testament, to papal decretals, and eventually to Joachimite prophecy, against a Franciscan leadership that increasingly treated such rigour as a threat to the order's cohesion and to its standing within the Church. Whereas the disputes of Francis's own lifetime were resolved, or at least contained, through personal mediation and the cohesion of a small fraternity, those of the Spirituals could only be settled through formal ecclesiastical instruments — chapters, decretals, and ultimately the Inquisition — reflecting a shift from a movement defined by shared practice to one defined by doctrinal opposition and, eventually, outright condemnation.

A first compromise, based on Bonaventure's contention that property bequeathed to the friars belonged in law to the Catholic Church while the friars retained only its use, was embodied in Pope Nicholas III's decretal Exiit qui seminat (1279); the Spirituals found this solution unacceptable, and it was reaffirmed without resolving the dispute in 1312. Some Spirituals also adopted the apocalyptic doctrines of Joachim of Fiore concerning an approaching "age of the Holy Spirit," a belief that widened the breach with the more moderate Conventual friars after the 1254 condemnation of Gerard of Borgo San Donnino's Introduction to the Eternal Gospel and the forced resignation of the Joachimite minister general John of Parma in 1257; the rift deepened further with the relaxations of the rule of poverty introduced after Bonaventure's death in 1274, and with the 1283 condemnation of the views of the Provençal Spiritual Peter John Olivi.

Over time, as the order grew, it faced the demands of caring for sick or elderly friars, and providing for its members sent to university for theological training. The order divided into two branches, the Zelanti, or Spirituals, and the Relaxati, known later as the Conventuals. The Zelanti strictly observed the poverty enjoined by the testament of Saint Francis, and lived isolated, simple lives. The Relaxati or Conventuals lived in convents in the towns, tending attached churches with the necessary liturgical furnishings and devoting themselves also to studying and preaching, which required the accumulation and use of books.

==== Declaration of heresy and the rise of Fraticelli ====
In support of the friars’ commitment to “holy poverty”, Pope Gregory IX adopted a legal construct whereby gifts to the Franciscans were vested in the Holy See, thus only granting the friars mere loaned use of these. In this way, they did not need to be perennially destitute. Pope Innocent IV gave the Franciscans permission to appoint “procurators” to buy, sell, and administer goods given to them. Pope Nicholas III confirmed this arrangement in 1279, in the papal bull Exiit qui seminat. The Zelanti or "Spirituals" felt this abrogated the spirit of Saint Francis, and believed a restricted use of property was more in keeping with his rule. The differences were not fully adjusted nor was unity ever completely restored between the Spirituals and the main body of the order, the Community.

Neither Nicholas III's Exiit qui seminat nor Clement V's Exivi de paradiso, issued in 1312 in the wake of the Council of Vienne, succeeded in reconciling the two positions, and in 1317 Pope John XXII's bull Quorundam exigit formally censured the Spirituals; the following year four of the most obdurate friars were burned at the stake as heretics, while other dissidents, later known as the Fraticelli, continued to be prosecuted by the Inquisition. The dispute soon acquired a further, more theoretical dimension when John XXII, in the bull Cum inter nonnullos (1323), declared it heretical to maintain that Christ and the Apostles had owned nothing; the order's minister general, Michael of Cesena, together with Bonagratia of Bergamo and William of Ockham, rejected the ruling and took refuge with the excommunicated emperor Louis IV of Bavaria, whose Appeal of Sachsenhausen (1324) likewise repudiated the papal decision, although Cesena's successor as minister general, Geraldus Odonis, subsequently submitted to the pope on behalf of the order. Although persecution greatly reduced the numbers of the Spirituals, the movement nonetheless gave impetus to the rise of stricter reform currents within the order, first the Friars of the Strict Observance and later the Capuchins.

== Various Fraticelli groups ==
=== Angelo da Clareno and the Clareni ===
The first Fraticelli group was begun by Brother Angelo da Clareno (also “da Cingoli”). Angelo and several brethren from the March of Ancona had been sentenced in c. 1278 to life imprisonment, but were liberated by the general of the order, Raimondo Gaufredi (1289–1295) and sent to Armenia, where the king Hethum II welcomed them. The local clergy, however, were less enthusiastic, and following popular agitations against them the group were expelled from Armenia towards the end of 1293. They returned to Italy, where in 1294 Celestine V, noted for his asceticism but whose pontificate lasted scarcely six months, permitted them to live as hermits in the strict observance of the Rule of Saint Francis. Celestine absolved them of their vows of obedience to their Franciscan superiors, and constituted them as a separate group of “Poor Hermits” who could live at the monasteries of the Celestines. He also named Cardinal Napoleone Orsini as cardinal-protector.

After the abdication of Celestine V, his successor, Boniface VIII, revoked all of Celestine’s concessions, and the Clareni emigrated to Greece, where some of them attacked the legality of the pope’s action. The Conventuals persuaded Boniface that the Clareni still held for Celestine and did not recognize Boniface as pope. He then persuaded the Patriarch of Constantinople, John XII, to take measures against them, and they moved to Thessaly. Seeking to defend themselves against this calumny, they returned to Italy where their leader, Fra Liberatus, attempted a vindication of their rights, first with Boniface VIII (d. 11 October 1303), and then with Benedict XI, who also died prematurely (7 July 1304). On his journey to Clement V (1305–1314) at Lyon in 1307, Liberatus died, and Angelo da Clareno succeeded him as leader of the community.

Angelo remained in Central Italy until 1311, when he went to Avignon, where he was protected by his patrons Cardinals Giacomo Colonna and Napoleone Orsini Frangipani. There, he successfully defended himself against a charge of heresy that had been brought against him. He was finally acquitted after a tedious and searching examination.

Early in 1317 John XXII, pursuant to a decree of the late Boniface VIII, declared Angelo excommunicated and placed him in custody. He ably defended himself in his Epistola Excusatoria, but John XXII refused to approve the "Clareni" as a religious congregation, and compelled Angelo to adopt the habit of a Celestine hermit. Angelo remained at the papal court in Avignon until the death of his friend Cardinal Colonna in 1318, and then returned to Italy. The procurator of the Celestines refused to allow him to stay at Celestine monasteries: he was instead welcomed by the Benedictine abbot Bartolomeo at the Sacro Speco di Subiaco. In 1334, John XXII ordered the guardian of the Convent of Aracoeli in Rome to take possession of the person of Angelo, but Abbot Bartolomeo refused to hand him over.

It appears from the papal bulls that the followers of Angelo established themselves in Central Italy, i.e., in the province of Rome, Umbria, and the March of Ancona, and also in Southern Italy (Campagna, Basilicata, and Naples). From Subiaco, Angelo sent circular letters to his friars who live in hermitages or were scattered in convents. He assumed charge of the congregation dissolved by the pope, appointing provincials, ministers and custodians, and establishing new friaries. John XXII and his immediate successors issued numerous decrees against the Fraticelli in the March of Ancona, where the bishops and minor feudal barons defended them stubbornly and successfully in spite of papal threats. As he grew increasingly infirm, Angelo less able to visit friars scattered around Rome, Ancona, Naples, and Umbria, and communicated with them by letter. The lack of his personal presence contributed to a decline in discipline.

His adherents considered their rule as representing the Gospel, and they reasoned as the Pope cannot dispense from the Gospel, so he also cannot dispense from the rule nor or even explain it in any way other than its literal sense. After the controversy regarding poverty broke out (1321–1328), all the Fraticelli showed stronger opposition to the papacy.

With the election of Benedict XII, the Fraticelli hoped for reconciliation with the Avignon papacy. At a consistory on 23 December 1334, Benedict XII scorned the Fraticelli, criticising their conduct, heretical tendencies, lax discipline, and outright contempt for the official Church.

Angelo was able to move from Subiaco, heading towards the Kingdom of Naples, where the presence of Philip of Majorca and Provençal and Catalan Spirituals at the court of Queen Sancha guaranteed continuous assistance. Angelo died 15 July 1337, and the leaderless congregation, loosely organized to begin with and hard-pressed by the Inquisition, splintered into a number of groups.

Angelo was highly esteemed by the Augustinian Hermits, with whom he was on friendly terms, especially with Gentile da Foligno and Simone da Cassia, an ascetic writer of great repute. He corresponded with both, and after the death of Angelo, Simone bitterly lamented the loss of a friend and spiritual adviser. It is likely that the Fraticelli whom Simone afterwards successfully defended against the Dominicans in the civil courts at Florence (c. 1355), where he was then preaching, were adherents of Clareno.

In April 1389, Fra Michele Berti, from Calci near Pisa, a member of the Ancona branch of Fraticelli, after preaching the Lenten course to his associates in Florence, was arrested as he was about to leave the city, and condemned by the Franciscan Archbishop of Florence, Bartolomeo Oleari, to be burnt at the stake. Berti was executed 30 April 1389, chanting the Te Deum as he died while his followers, unmolested by the authorities, exhorted him to remain steadfast. To the end, he maintained that John XXII had become a heretic by his four decretals, that he and his successors had forfeited the papacy, and that no priest supporting them could validly absolve sins.

The "Poor Hermits" of Monte della Majella, near Sulmona, were adherents of Angelo da Clareno, and at one time afforded protection to the famous tribune of the people, Cola di Rienzi (1349). Fanatical as they were on the subject of poverty, they were, in accordance with ancient custom, sheltered by Celestine monks in the nearby abbey of Santo Spirito. The origin of the Clareni, approved as true Franciscans by Sixtus IV in 1474, is unknown, nor is it clear whether they were “moderate” followers of Angelo who managed to remain within the bounds of orthodoxy, or schismatics who recanted after breaking communion with the papacy.

=== Fraticelli de paupere vita ===
Chronologically the second main group of Fraticelli were the Spirituals who fled from Tuscany to Sicily, and were surnamed at first the “Rebellious Brothers” and Apostates, but later the "Fraticelli de paupere vita".

When, in 1309, the differences between the Relaxati and the Spirituals had reached a critical point, Clement V cited representatives of both parties to appear before the Curia with a view to adjusting their disputes. The result of this conference was the Constitution Exivi de Paradiso, enacted at the final session of the Council of Vienne (6 May 1312). This Constitution contained an explanation of the Rule of Saint Francis along stricter lines than those of the bull Exiit qui seminat of Nicholas III (14 August 1279), and justified the Spirituals in various matters. This proceeding, however, only provoked the Relaxati superiors to take energetic measures against the Zelanti.

Towards the end of 1312 a number of Tuscan Spirituals left their monasteries and took forcible possession of the monasteries of Carmignano (near Florence), Arezzo, and Asciano, putting the Relaxati to flight. About fifty, fearing punishment, fled to Sicily. Clement V, hearing of these events, commanded the Archbishop of Genoa and two other bishops to force them to return to obedience under penalty of excommunication. As nearly all disregarded this mandate, the prior of San Fidele at Siena, who had been commissioned to execute it, declared them excommunicated and placed their monasteries under interdict (14 May 1314). As it soon became impossible for them to remain in Tuscany, they all fled to Sicily, where they were joined by numerous Zelanti from Northern Italy and Southern France. King Frederick of Sicily, brother of King James II of Aragon, admitted them after they had submitted their statutes to his inspection. Fra Enrico da Ceva was now their leader.

John XXII (15 March 1317) admonished King Frederick to take severe measures against them. In a letter of the same date addressed by the cardinals at Avignon to the entire hierarchy of Sicily, special stress was laid on the fact that the fugitives had elected a superior general, provincials, and guardians. On 23 January 1318, Pope John XXII excommunicated them in the bull Gloriosam ecclesiam, specifying five errors, to wit: (1) they designated the Roman Church as carnal and corrupt, and themselves as spiritual; (2) they denied to the Roman priesthood all power and jurisdiction; (3) they forbade taking an oath; (4) they taught that priests in the state of sin could not confer the sacraments; and (5) they asserted that they alone were the true observers of the Gospel.

Banished from Sicily, where, however, some remained till at least 1328, they established themselves securely in Naples.

=== Michaelites ===
This third group of the Fraticelli derive their name from Michael of Cesena (died 1342), their chief representative and natural leader. It must be premised that this name was in vogue during the fifteenth century and that the party it designated exerted great influence in doctrinal matters on the other groups as early as 1329.

The controversy began at Narbonne in 1321 between the Dominicans and Franciscans. The main question at issue seems to have been whether it is heretical to assert that Christ and His Apostles possessed no property either in particular or in common. In 1321 the Dominican Inquisitor at Narbonne, John of Belna, declared heretical the teaching of an imprisoned Beghard of that region, who asserted that Christ and the Apostles owned nothing either individually or in common. The Franciscan lector, Bérenger Talon, defended the Beghard. Berenger refused to retract and was threatened with punishment by the inquisitor. The matter soon developed into a general controversy between the Dominicans and Franciscans. On this particular issue the Relaxati and Zelanti agreed citing the Bull of Nicholas III, Exiit qui seminat, which had defined the poverty of the Franciscans, both individually and collectively, as equivalent to that of the Apostles, and had therefore transferred to the Roman Church all their holdings in land and houses, as had already been enacted by Innocent IV (14 November 1245).

Because of the important bearing of the controversy on the rule of the Friars Minor, a general chapter of the order was convoked at Perugia, in June of the year 1322, and the minister general, together with the other members of the chapter, caused two letters or communications to be published in which the mind of the chapter regarding the controversy is set forth at considerable length. Anticipating, on the advice of the Franciscan Cardinals Vitalis and Bertrand, the definitive decision of the pope, the chapter solemnly declared in favor of the "absolute poverty" of Christ (4 June 1322). This pronunciamento was signed by the general, Michael of Cesena, the provincial ministers of Southern Germany, England (William of Nottingham, not Occam), Aquitania, Northern France, and others, as well as by several renowned scholars. On 11 June the chapter solemnly published its decrees to all Christendom.

Indignant at the action of the chapter at Perugia, Pope John XXII published the bull Ad conditorem canonum (8 December 1322), in which he renounces the dominion of all the goods of the Friars Minor hitherto assumed by the Roman pontiffs. He declared that the Roman Church renounced all its claims to the movable and immovable properties of the Franciscan Order and therewith returned them. John echoed Gerard of Abbeville, declaring that the ownership of a thing cannot be separated from its actual use or consumption. The Franciscans objected to this attack on their longstanding beliefs and customs and the poverty that was their hallmark.

In the name of the order Bonagrazia of Bergamo, a capable lawyer and up to that time a bitter enemy of the Zelanti, presented a daring protest against this Bull to the consistory of 14 January 1323. Although the pope thereupon revised the text of the Bull and reissued it under the original date, he incarcerated Bonagrazia and in the bull Cum inter nonnullos (12 November 1323) declared heretical the assertion that Christ and the Apostles possessed no property either separately or collectively.

The controversy between the pope and the order soon took on a political character, the Minorites having been appointed counselors to Louis IV the Bavarian, King of Germany, who also was engaged in a conflict with the pope. The Sachsenhausen Appeal of King Louis of 22 May 1324 was full of invectives against the “heretic who falsely designates himself Pope John XXII” for doing away with the poverty of Christ. This famous "Spiritualist excursus" is closely connected with the Appeal of Bonagrazia, and with writings of Ubertino of Casale and of Peter John Olivi. It is certain that it originated among the Franciscans who, under the protection of the king, aimed it at John XXII and his teaching, although Louis IV later denied all responsibility in the matter. The result was that Louis IV was excommunicated. The general chapter of the order, assembled at Lyon on 20 May 1325 under the presidency of Michael of Cesena, forbade any disrespectful reference to the pope.

On 8 June 1327, Michael received instructions to present himself at Avignon, a command which he obeyed in December 1327. The pope having sharply reproved him in public (9 April 1328) for the chapter's action at Perugia, he drew up a secret protest and, fearing punishment, fled, despite the orders of the pope, to Aigues-Mortes and thence to Pisa, together with Bonagrazia of Bergamo and William of Occam.

In the meantime, Louis the Bavarian had entered Rome with a German army, and had himself solemnly crowned Emperor of Rome by Sciarra Colonna (17 January 1328); on 12 May he nominated and had consecrated as antipope Pietro Rainalducci of Corvara, a Franciscan, under the name of Nicholas V. The three fugitives from Avignon accompanied Louis to Bavaria, where they remained till their deaths. After Louis IV had returned to Bavaria, Nicholas V, deprived of all support, took refuge with the Count of Donoratico.

John XXII deposed Michael as general of the order and appointed the Minorite Cardinal Bertrand de Turre vicar-general of the order to preside at the chapter to be held in Paris (2 June 1329). Obedient to John XXII, he induced the majority of the order to submit to the Holy See. Michael of Cesena and all his adherents, the Michaelites, were repudiated by the order. At the same time, by command of John XXII, papal proceedings were instituted against them everywhere. The Michaelites denied John's right to the papacy and denounced both him and his successors as heretics.

The proceedings against Michael were published in various localities. On 5 September 1328, John XXII commanded the imprisonment of Fra Azzolino, who was acting as Michael’s vicar, and on 18 August 1331, the arrest of another vicar, Fra Thedino, who represented Michael in the March of Ancona.

Prominent among the followers of Michael were the more or less numerous Minorites in the monasteries of Todi and Amelia (against whom proceedings were instituted in 1329–30), of Cortona (1329), and of Pisa (1330), where, however, they appeared openly as late as 1354, and at Albigano, and Savonna (1329–1332). Papal decrees reveal the presence of Michaelites in England (1329), Germany (1322), Carcassonne, Portugal (1330), Spain (1329), Sicily and Lombardy (1329, 1334), Sardinia, Armenia, and other places.

The records of a process (1334) conducted in irregular form against the Fraticelli of the Franciscan monastery at Tauris, who had been reported by Dominicans, show that they inveighed openly against John XXII and upheld the views of Michael of Cesena, although in their apocalyptic manner they declared that the order of the Friars Minor was divided in three parts, and that only those would be saved who would journey to the East, i.e. themselves. It is uncertain whether these were identical with the Fraticelli in Armenia, Persia, and other oriental localities, where all bishops were commanded by Clement VI to prosecute them (29 May 1344). For a long time, the sect prospered exceedingly in the Duchy of Spoleto on account of the continual political turmoil. In a process instituted against a particular Umbrian group of Fraticelli in 1360, it is noted that Fra Francesco Niccolò of Perugia was their founder. They pretended to observe the Rule of St. Augustine, but were fanatical on the question of poverty and regarded all prelates as guilty of simony.

They imitated the Sicilian Fraticelli in their doctrines and methods of instruction. A letter is still extant which the Fraticelli of the Campagna (1353–1355) wrote to the magistrates of Narni when they heard that one of their number (Fra Stefano) had been cruelly imprisoned by the Inquisition of that city twelve or fifteen years before. In this letter, they petitioned the magistrates to liberate him according to the example of the cities of “Todi, Perugia, Assisi, and Pisa”.

== Naples ==
It subsequently becomes difficult to differentiate these groups with precision. In Naples and Calabria, where King Robert and Queen Sanzia exhibited special veneration for St. Francis and his humble followers, the chaplaincies were held by Franciscans. There resided Fra Philip of Majorca, a brother of the queen. Like his father, James II of Majorca, Philip was sympathetic towards the Spiritual Franciscans. He was also a great admirer of Angelo da Clareno. In 1328 Philip had petitioned John XXII for permission for himself and other Franciscans to observe literally the Rule of St. Francis, independently of the superiors of the order; the pope had refused. In a letter dated 10 August 1333, the pope was obliged to settle some doubts of the queen relating to the observance of "holy poverty", and the king had even composed a treatise favouring the views of the Chapter of Perugia (1322). The papal condemnations of the Fraticelli, therefore, had produced but slight results in the Kingdom of Naples.

On 1 August 1322, John XXII issued a general decree against the "Fraticelli de paupere vita", and after sending King Robert (4 February 1325) the Bulls specially directed against Fra Enrico da Ceva, on 10 May 1325, demanded their imprisonment at the hands of King Robert and of Charles, Duke of Calabria. The pope had to repeat this admonition several times (1327, 1330, 1331) to proceed against the Fraticelli. After this, some joined the Michaelites. The statement that some professed Mohammedanism may be based on fact, considering their situation and the local circumstances.

On 8 July 1331, the pope admonished King Robert to withhold no longer the papal decrees against Michael of Cesena nor prevent their publication in his kingdom. Philip of Majorca, however, preached openly against the pope. It was due to the influence of the royal family that Fra Andrea of Galiano, a court chaplain at Naples, was acquitted in the process instituted against him at Avignon in 1338, as he still continued his intercourse with Michael of Cesena and with the fifty Michaelites who resided for some time under the king's protection in the castle of Lettere near Castellamare, but who later (1235) humbly submitted to their lawful superiors.

In 1336, "short-robed" Fraticelli still occupied the monastery of Santa Chiara at Naples, founded by Queen Sanzia, and were established in other parts of the kingdom; their expulsion was demanded on 24 June 1336 by Benedict XII (1334–1342). In 1344, Clement VI (1342–1352) found it necessary to reiterate the earlier decrees.

Several followers of Clareno were in the territory of Naples in 1362. Louis of Durazzo (a nephew of Robert, King of Naples) maintained a number of Fraticelli in a hospital adjoining his castle, Monte Sant' Angelo, and attended their services. These Fraticelli were divided into three sects: those acknowledging Tommaso da Bojano, former Bishop of Aquino; the followers of the pretended minister general, Bernard of Sicily; and those who claimed Angelo da Clareno as their founder and acknowledged only his successor as their general. All three sects agreed in holding that the true papacy had ceased since the alleged heresy of John XXII, but the party of the minister general held it lawful to accept, in case of necessity, the ministrations of priests who adhered to the papacy.

Between 1363–1370, it at last became possible for Franciscans to take possession of several monasteries in Calabria and Sicily from which the Fraticelli had been expelled; but Gregory XI complained on 12 September 1372 that the "ashes and bones of Fraticelli were venerated as relics of saints in Sicily, and churches were even erected in their honour".

== Other areas ==
The Fraticelli enjoyed complete liberty in Perugia. They lived where it best suited them, principally in the country-houses of the rich. They became so bold as to publicly insult the Minorites (Conventuals) in the monastery of San Francesco al Prato. It appears that these Fraticelli had elected their own popes, bishops and generals, and that they were split into various factions. The Conventuals, as their one means of defence, called in Fra Paoluccio of Trinci, the founder of the Observants, and ceded to him the small monastery on Monte Ripido near the city (1374). Fra Paoluccio was successful in his disputations with the Fraticelli, and when they had been clearly exposed as heretics, the people drove them from the city. These Fraticelli, and probably all the others of that period, were designated Fraticelli della opinione, perhaps on account of their opinion that the Roman papacy had ceased to exist with John XXII (1323) or Celestin V, and that they alone constituted the true Church. About this time, Fra Vitale di Francia and Fra Pietro da Firenze exercised a sort of generalship over the Fraticelli. They received protection and hospitality from rich and influential families in Apulia, around Rome, and in the March. One of their protectors was the knight Andreuccio de Palumbario, who sheltered them in his castle near Rieti, for which he was sharply called to account by Urban VI (4 May 1388). On the same day, the Benedictine Abbot of Farfa was reprimanded for a similar fault.

On 14 November 1394, Boniface IX empowered the Minorites of Terra di Lavoro to take possession of the monasteries deserted by the Fraticelli. Martin V conceded the same rights to the Franciscans of the Roman Province (14 November 1418) and, on 7 April 1426, transferred to them as a special grant the monastery of Palestrina, which had been a stronghold of the Fraticelli. In the same year, Martin V nominated St. John Capistran (27 May) and St. James of the Marches (11 October) as inquisitors general to take action against the Fraticelli. These promoters of order among the Franciscans fulfilled the duties of their office strictly and energetically and succeeded in striking at the very vitals of the sect. In 1415, the city of Florence had formally banished the "Fraticelli of the poor life, the followers of Michelino of Cesena of infamous memory", and in Lucca five Fraticelli, on trial, had solemnly abjured their error (1411). Martin V also ordered the Bishops of Porto and Alba to take steps against all Fraticelli "in the Roman province, the March of Ancona, the Duchy of Spoleto and other localities" (7 June 1427).

On 27 January of the same year, Martin V permitted the Observants of Ancona to occupy the monastery of the Fraticelli at Castro l'Ermita as a first step in the campaign against the Fraticelli of that neighbourhood. On 1 June 1428, he commanded the Bishop of Ancona to enforce his rulings strictly in Maiolati, to put all suspects to the rack, destroy their village, separate the children from heretical parents, and disperse the elder population. A circular letter, which the Fraticelli addressed to all Christendom, proved ineffectual and their doom was sealed. John of Capistrano and James of the Marches burned thirty-six of their establishments or dispersed the members and also a number were burned at the stake at Florence and Fabriano, at the latter place in the presence of the pope.

== Later history ==
A form of Fraticelli was also represented by Philip of Berbegni, a fanatical and eccentric Observant of Spain (1433), who attempted to establish a strict society de la Capuciola, but met vigorous opposition from John Capistran, who issued a dissertation against him.

James of March, commissioned by Nicholas V to proceed against them (1449), wrote the "Dialogus contra Fraticellos", which he first published in 1452, making some additions to it later on. According to this the main establishments of the Fraticelli were situated in the valley of Jesi, at Maiolati, Poggio Cupo, Massaccia, and Mergo. They had also constituted bishops in other districts where there were a sufficient number of adherents. They made frequent journeys for propaganda purposes, especially in Tuscany. Some dressed partly as Minorites, some as hermits, often disguising themselves for the sake of protection. Their doctrine was a résumé of their former sectarian errors: the whole Roman Church had deserted the true Faith since the time of John XXII (1323); they alone constituted the true Church and retained the sacraments and the priesthood.

Only once again are measures known to have been taken against the Fraticelli, viz., in 1466, when a number of Fraticelli from Poli, near Palestrina, and Maiolati were captured at Assisi during the Portiuncula celebration. They were imprisoned in the castle of Sant' Angelo and proceedings instituted against them. Their protector at Poli, Count Stefano de' Conti, was imprisoned, but they also received the protection of the noble Colonna family of Palestrina. Tradition also mentions that the Fraticelli established many other colonies and that they had an important centre in Greece, whence they sent out emissaries and where they sought refuge from the aggressive measures of St. James of the March. They generally held their reunions at night in private houses and half of the inhabitants of Poli are said to have been among their adherents. The allegation that their religious services were defiled by immoral practices cannot be proved. According to their doctrine, as contained in the "Dialogus", immoral priests incurred the loss of the powers of order and jurisdiction. They had also their own bishop, Nicholas by name.

During this period numerous pamphlets were published controverting the errors of the Fraticelli. While the campaign was going on at Rome, information was brought concerning another sect similar to the Fraticelli, which had been discovered in Germany; but though these visionaries, led by Brothers Johann and Livin of Wirsberg, found adherents among the Mendicants in Bohemia and Franconia, they cannot be considered as Fraticelli. In spite of all persecutions, remnants of the original Fraticelli still survived, but their strength was crippled.

== Bibliography ==
- Keen (1969). The Pelican History of Medieval Europe. Penguin Books. ISBN 9780140210859.
- Angelus (Clarenus) (2005). Angelo Clareno: A Chronicle Or History of the Seven Tribulations of the Order of Brothers Minor. Translated by David Burr; Emmett Randolph Daniel. St. Bonaventure, NY USA: Franciscan Institute Publications. ISBN 978-1-57659-198-7.
- Burr, David (2010). Spiritual Franciscans: From Protest to Persecution in the Century After Saint Francis. University Park PA USA: Penn State Press. ISBN 978-0-271-04138-4.
- Douie, Decima Langworthy (1932). The Nature and the Effect of the Heresy of the Fraticelli. Manchester England UK: Manchester University Press. GGKEY:85K67SXS83A.
- Duba, William and Christopher David Schabel, ed. (2009). Gerald Odonis, Doctor Moralis and Franciscan Minister General: Studies in Honour of L. M. de Rijk. New York/Leiden: Brill. ISBN 978-90-04-17850-2.
- Ehrle, Franz (1886). "Die Spiritualen, ihre Verhaltniss zum Franciscanerorden und zu den Fraticellen". Archiv für Literatur- und Kirchengeschichte des Mittelalters. 2: 108–336. (in German and Latin)
- Havely, Nick (2004). Dante and the Franciscans: Poverty and the Papacy in the 'Commedia'. Cambridge: Cambridge University Press. ISBN 978-0-521-83305-9.
- Mollat, Guillaume (1965). The Popes at Avignon, 1305-1378. Harper & Rowe.
- Muzzey, David Saville (1907). The Spiritual Franciscans. New York: Columbia university.
- Ginther, James R., ed. (2009). The Westminster Handbook to Medieval Theology. Westminster John Knox Press. ISBN 978-0-664-22397-7.
- Hughes, Philip (1979). "Chapter II, part 2 and part 3". History of the Church: Volume 3: The Revolt Against The Church: Aquinas To Luther. London: Sheed and Ward/A&C Black. pp. 125–187. ISBN 978-0-7220-7983-6.
- Mäkinen, Virpi (2001). Property Rights in the Late Medieval Discussion on Franciscan Poverty. Leuven/Louvain: Peeters Publishers. ISBN 978-90-429-0940-3.
- Piron, S., Le mouvement clandestin des dissidents franciscains au milieu du XIVe siècle, Oliviana, 3, 2009, on-line http://oliviana.revues.org/index337.html
- Robson, Michael and Jens Röhrkasten, ed. (2010). Franciscan Organisation in the Mendicant Context: Formal and Informal Structures of the Friars' Lives and Ministry in the Middle Ages. Münster: LIT Verlag Münster. ISBN 978-3-643-10820-3. [especially the article by M. Brunner, pp. 353–375]
- Scalisi, Gabriella (1973). L'idea di chiesa: negli spirituali e nei fraticelli. Studi e testi francescani, v. 52 (in Italian). Roma: L.I.E.F.
- Tierney, Brian (1972). Origins of papal infallibility, 1150-1350: 1150 – 1350; a study on the concepts of infallibility, sovereignty and tradition in the Middle Ages. Leiden: Brill. GGKEY:UTAT6JZ4N46.
- Lambertini, Roberto (2006). "Non so che fraticelli...": identità e tensioni minoritiche nella Marchia di Angelo Clareno (PDF) (in Italian). Spoleto: Centro Italiano di Studi sull'Alto Medioevo.
