= Rule of Saint Francis =

Monastic rule followed by the Order of Friars Minor

Francis of Assisi founded three religious orders and gave each of them a special rule. Here, only the rule of the first order is discussed, i.e., that of the Order of Friars Minor.

== Origin and contents of the rule ==
=== Origin ===
Whether St. Francis wrote several rules or one rule only, with several versions, whether he received it directly from heaven through revelations, or whether it was the fruit of his long experiences, whether he gave it the last touch or whether its definite form is due to the influence of others, all these are questions which find different answers.

The first rule is that which Francis submitted to Pope Innocent III for approval in the year 1209. While its actual text is unknown, according to Thomas of Celano and Bonaventure, this primitive rule was little more than some passages of the Gospel heard in 1208 in the chapel of the Portiuncula. From which Gospel precisely these words were taken, is unknown. The following passages, Matthew 19:21; Matthew 16:24; Luke 9:3, occurring in the second rule (i and xiv), are considered as a part of the original one of 1209. They enjoin apostolical life with all its renouncements and privations. The three vows of obedience, chastity, and poverty, essential to any religious order, and some practical rules of conduct were added. Thomas of Celano says in this regard, "Blessed Francis, seeing that the Lord God was daily increasing the number [of the brethren] for that very purpose, wrote down simply and in few words for himself and his brethren, both present and future, a pattern and rule of life, using chiefly the language of the holy Gospel after whose perfection alone he yearned". Bonaventure and the so-called "Legend of the Three Companions" (viii) repeat almost the same words. It was to this "form of life," which has become known as the First Rule, that Innocent III gave verbal approval on April 23, 1209.

In 1215, Canon 13 of the Fourth Council of the Lateran forbade the establishment of new religious orders and required those who wished to found a new house to choose an existing approved rule. Livarius Oliger sees in the fact that Francis and his followers were considered exempt from this prohibition, an implicit approval.

The text of the primitive rule seems to have been lost very early. This first rule marks the stage of the order governed by St. Francis's authority, and it is quite natural that this first attempt could not be developed as later rules were. Francis did not take as his model any monastic order, but simply the life of Christ and His Apostles, the Gospel itself.

==== The Rule of 1221 ====
Jacques de Vitry, in a letter written at Genoa, in 1216 says that the rule of 1209 was successively improved at the annual general chapter at Portiuncula by new statutes, the fruit of ever-growing experience. The traditional "Legend of the Three Companions" says (c. xiv): "At Whitsuntide [every year] all the brethren assembled unto St. Mary and consulted how best they might observe the Rule. Moreover St. Francis gave unto them admonition, rebukes, and precepts, according as seemed good unto him by the counsel of the Lord."

During the years 1219-1220 in the absence of the holy founder in the East, some events happened which determined Francis to recast his rule, in order to prevent similar troubles in the future. The only author who informs us well on this point is Jordanus of Giano in his Chronicle. The vicars left in charge of the brothers by Francis having made some innovations against the spirit of the rule, and Francis having heard of this, he immediately returned to Italy and with the help of Cardinal-Protector Ugolino repressed the disorders. One of these innovations was a prohibition against eating meat. This Francis overruled in keeping with Acts 10:15, "What God has made clean, you are not to call profane". Jordanus then goes on: "And thus the disturbers with the help of the Lord being kept down, he [St. Francis] reformed the Order according to its statutes. And the blessed Francis seeing that brother Caesarius [of Spires] was learned in holy letters, he charged him to embellish with texts of the Gospel the Rule which he himself had written with simple words."

In the early years, Francis had been able to lead the friars by his personal charisma. As their number grew, and there were scattered in distant countries many who had never or rarely met the founder. Angelo Clareno says that at some general chapter the ministers and custodes, asked Cardinal Ugolino to use his influence with Francis that he might introduce some organization into the order according to the Rules of Augustine, Benedict, and Bernard, and that they might receive some influence. Francis being questioned, answered that he was called to walk by the way of simplicity, and that he would always follow the folly of the Cross. The chapter at which this occurred was most, likely the one of 1220.

Nonetheless, in a bull of Honorius III, of 22 September, 1220 "to the Priors or Custodes of the Friars Minor," one year of novitiate is introduced, in conformity with other orders, after which no one may leave the order (c. ii of the rule of 1221). Furthermore, much authority is given to the ministers through the general chapter, which hitherto had been frequented by all the brothers, but since is reserved to the ministers. This is about the time that Francis delegated the direct day to day governance to Peter of Cataneo as vicar general.

The second rule was probably published at the General Chapter of Portiuncula, 1221, where for the last time all the friars convened. It was certainly in use in the autumn of the same year, since the Friars in Germany held at Augsburg in October 1221, a provincial chapter in accordance with c. xviii of this rule. It may appear strange that neither Thomas of Celano nor St. Bonaventure mentions this second rule, which certainly marked an important stage in the Franciscan Order. The reason thereof may be because it was composed in connexion with troubles arisen within the order, on which they preferred to keep silent.

The second rule is called "Regula prima" by a number of Franciscan writers, it being the first known in its text, or also "Regula non bullata," for it was never solemnly confirmed by a papal Bull. It has been preserved in many manuscripts and has been often printed. It consists of twenty-three chapters, some of which are composed almost entirely of scriptural texts; in others many admonitions are found and towards the end even prayers.

Paschal Robinson says that the second rule "...is not a new one, but the same that Innocent III approved, not indeed in its original form, which has not come down to us, but rather in the form it had assumed in the course of twelve years, as a consequence of many changes and additions." The introductory words "Brother Francis...promises obedience and reverence to our Lord Pope Innocent" (d. 1216) indicate that the second rule is only an enlarged version of the primitive one.

==== The Rule of 1223 ====
Bonaventure relates that when the order had greatly increased, St. Francis had a vision which determined him to reduce the rule to a shorter form. Francis, with Brother Leo and Brother Bonizo of Bologna, went in 1223 to Fonte Colombo, a beautiful wood-covered hill near Rieti, where, fasting on bread and water, he caused the rule to be written down by Brother Leo. Brother Elias, to whom this rule was entrusted, after a few days declared that he had lost it, hence Francis had the rule rewritten. The rule composed in 1223 was solemnly confirmed by the Bull "Solet annuere" of Honorius III of 29 November 1223.

The rule of 1223 is the Franciscan Rule properly so called, the rule which the Friars Minor still observe. It is named by Franciscan authors "Regula bullata" or "Regula secunda." From what has been already said, it may be gathered that St. Francis successively developed his rule, adapting it to the circumstances. Those who believe in an influence exercised on St. Francis in recasting the third rule the point that Pope Gregory IX, in the Bull Quo elongati (1230), says that he knew the intention of St. Francis with regard to the rule, as he had assisted him when he wrote it and obtained its confirmation.

=== Contents ===
The rule is contained in the Bull "Solet annuere", and begins with these characteristic words: "The rule and life of the Minor Brothers is this, namely, to observe the holy Gospel of our Lord Jesus Christ by living in obedience, without property and in chastity." St. Francis promises obedience to Pope Honorius and his successors, the other brothers are to obey Brother Francis and his successors (c. i). Having thus laid the solid foundation of unity upon the Church, St. Francis gives particulars concerning reception, profession, and vestments of the brothers. They are forbidden to wear shoes, if not compelled through necessity (c. ii). Chapter the third prescribes for the clerics "the Divine Office according to the order of the holy Roman Church, with the exception of the Psalter; wherefore (or, as soon as) they may have breviaries." The laybrothers have to say Paternosters, disposed according to the canonical hours. The brothers are to "fast from the feast of All Saints until the Nativity of the Lord," during Lent, and every Friday. The forty days' fast (obligatory in the rule of 1221), which begins Epiphany, is left free to the good will of the brothers. Beautiful exhortations follow on the behaviour of the brothers when they go through the world. They are forbidden to ride on horseback, unless compelled by manifest necessity or infirmity (c. iii). The next chapter "strictly enjoins on all the brothers that in no wise they receive coins or money, either themselves or through an interposed person." However, the ministers and custodes have to take the greatest care of their subjects through spiritual friends, according to places and times and other circumstances, saving always that, as has been said, they shall not "receive coins or money" (c. iv). To banish idleness and to provide for their support, St. Francis insists on the duty of working for "those brothers to whom the Lord has given the grace of working." But they must work in such a way that "they do not extinguish the spirit of prayer and devotion, to which all temporal things must be subservient." As a reward of their labour they may receive things needed, with the exception of coins or money (c. v). Of the highest importance is chapter vi. It contains the prescriptions of the most ideal poverty: "The brothers shall appropriate nothing to themselves, neither a house nor place nor anything. And as pilgrims and strangers in this world...let them go confidently in quest of alms." "This, my dearest brothers, is the height of the most sublime poverty, which has made you heirs and kings of the kingdom of heaven: poor in goods, but exalted in virtue...." Then follows an appeal for fraternal love and mutual confidence, "for if a mother nourishes and loves her carnal son, how much more earnestly ought one to love and nourish his spiritual brother!" (c. vi). The following chapter treats of penance to be inflicted on brothers who have sinned. In some cases they must recur to their ministers, who "should beware lest they be angry or troubled on account of the sins of others, because anger and trouble impede charity in themselves and in others" (c. vii).

Chapter viii charges all the brothers "always to have one of the brothers of this religion (order) as Minister General and servant of the whole brotherhood." At his death the provincial ministers and custodes must elect a successor in the Whitsun chapter. The general chapter, at which the provincial ministers are always bound to convene, is to be held every three years, or at a longer or shorter interval, where the general so wishes. After the Whitsun chapter, provincial chapters may be convoked by the ministers (c. viii). A special chapter on preachers follows next. The brothers are forbidden to preach in any diocese against the will of the bishop, and unless they are approved by the minister general. The brothers must preach "for the utility and edification of the people, announcing to them vices and virtues, punishment and glory..." (c. ix). "Of the admonition and correction of the Brothers" is the title of chapter x. The ministers "shall visit and admonish their brothers, and shall humbly and charitably correct them, not commanding them anything against their souls and our Rule. The brothers however who are subject must remember that, for God, they have renounced their own will." If any brother cannot observe the rule spiritually, he must recur to his minister, who is bound to receive him kindly (c. x). In chapter xi the brothers are forbidden to have suspicious intimacy with women, nor are they allowed to "enter monasteries of nuns, except those to whom special permission has been granted by the Apostolic See." Nor may they "be godfathers of men or women." The twelfth and last chapter treats of those who wish to go among the Saracens and other infidels, for which purpose they must obtain leave from their provincial ministers. The ministers are bound to ask of the pope a cardinal-protector, "so that" — with these touching words St. Francis concludes his rule — "being always subject and submissive at the feet of the same holy Church, grounded in the Catholic faith, we may observe poverty and humility and the holy Gospel of our Lord Jesus Christ, which we have firmly promised" (c. xii).

As may be seen from this survey the Franciscan rule contains many commandments, tempered by the sweet exhortations of St. Francis. It is the tender voice of a loving father that speaks to his children through the rule. This rule has been praised in the highest terms by different authorities. First of all St. Francis himself had a high idea of it: "This Rule he declared to be for his brethren the book of life, the hope of salvation, the marrow of the Gospel, the way of perfection, the key of Paradise and the covenant of an eternal alliance (II Cel., ii, 158). Nicholas III (Exiit) speaks in the same way: "This Rule is founded on the words of the Gospel, it has its force from the example of Christ's life, it is confirmed by the words and deeds of the founders of the Church, the Apostles." Angelo Clareno (Expositio) calls it "the Rule of charity and piety," "the Rule of peace, truth and piety." "The Evangelical Rule" is a much-used expression for it in old Franciscan literature. The influence which the Rule of St. Francis has exercised for seven hundred years is immeasurable. Millions have followed it, finding in it peace of heart, and the means of their own and other men's sanctification. Nor has the rule had less important effects in a more general way. Unlike all former rules, it established poverty not only for the individual members, but for the order as a whole. On this point St. Francis influenced even the Order of St. Dominic and many subsequent institutions. As early as the thirteenth century, Salimbene (ed. Holder-Egger, Mon. Germ. Hist.: Script., XXXII, 256) wrote: "Whoever wants to found a new congregation, always take something from the Order of blessed Francis." For the general influence of Franciscan poverty see Dubois, "St. Francis of Assisi, social reformer" (New York, 1906). The constitution of the order is likewise different from that of the monastic orders. It is strictly hierarchical, the convents being grouped into provinces which are governed by the provincials, who in turn are under the jurisdiction of the minister general, the head and ruler of the whole order. — The words of St. Francis (c. iii Reg.): "Let the clerics perform the Divine office according to the order of the holy Roman Church with the exception of the Psalter," have had a singular result. Through adopting the shorter breviary of the papal Curia the Franciscans made this breviary popular, reformed it in many points and led to its being practically received by the whole secular clergy. (See Baeumer, "Geschichte des Breviers," Freiburg im Br., 1895, p. 318 sqq.; Batiffol, "Histoire du Breviaire Romain," Paris, 1893, p. 142 sqq.) The principles concerning preaching as laid down by St. Francis in c. ix of his Rule contain the secret of the great Franciscan preachers who have always been among the most successful and popular. Finally, chap. xii on missions amongst the infidels is a happy innovation in religious rules, as Angelo Clareno in his exposition wisely observed. There can be no doubt that the great impulse given to foreign missions in the thirteenth century is due to St. Francis, who was himself a missionary in the East and saw some of his brethren martyred for the Faith.

== Interpretation ==
The ideal that St. Francis laid down in his rule is very high; the apostolical life was to be put in practice by his brethren, and indeed we see that St. Francis and his companions lived perfectly according to that standard. But the number of the friars rapidly increasing, and on the other hand, some being received into the order who had not the pure intentions and the great zeal of Francis, the rule gave rise to many controversies, and, as a consequence, to many declarations and expositions. The first exposition of the rule was given by St. Francis himself in his Testament (1226). He puts there his own and his first disciples' life as an example to the brothers. Moreover he forbids them "to ask for any letter from the Roman Curia, either for a church or for any other place, whether under pretext of preaching, or on account of their bodily persecution." He enjoins also on all brothers "not to put glosses on the Rule," but as he had written it purely and simply, so ought they "understand it simply and purely — and with holy operation observe it until the end." Nevertheless we have a great number of expositions of the rule, and it cannot be said that they are, in their greatest part, against the will of St. Francis. He himself had in his lifetime been humble enough to submit in everything to the decisions of the Church, and so he desired his sons to do. Even the Spirituals, who cleaved to the letter of the rule, as Olivi and Clareno, were not against reasonable expounding of the rule, and have written expositions thereof themselves. Besides, the decisions of the popes are not dispensations, but authentic interpretations of a rule, that binds only inasmuch as it is approved by the Church. To proceed with order, we shall firstly speak of the authentic interpretations, secondly of the private expositions.

=== Authentic interpretations ===
These are the papal Constitutions on the rule. Doubts about the meaning and the observance of the rule having risen at the general chapter of Assisi (1230), a deputation of prominent men was sent to Gregory IX, to obtain a papal decision. On 28 September 1230, the pope edited the Bull "Quo elongati" (Bull. Franc., I, 68), a document of capital importance for the future of the order. In this Bull the pope, claiming to know the intentions of the holy founder, since he had assisted him in the composition and approval of the rule, declares that for the tranquillity of conscience of the friars, the Testament of St. Francis has no binding power over them, as Francis, when making it, had no legislative power. Nor are the brothers bound to all the counsels of the Gospel, but only to those that are expressly mentioned in the rule, by way of precept or of prohibition. Dispositions are made with regard to money and property. The brothers may appoint a messenger (nuntius), who may receive money from benefactors and in the latter's name either spend it for the present needs of the friars, or confide it to a spiritual friend for imminent wants. The principle of absolute poverty is maintained for the individual friar and for the whole community; still the use of the necessary movable objects is granted them. These are some of the most striking dispositions of Gregory IX, whose principles of wise interpretation have remained fundamental for the order. Innocent IV, in the Bull "Ordinem vestrum," 14 Nov., 1245 (Bull. Franc. I, 400), confirmed the dispositions of his predecessor, but at the same time made more ample concessions, since he allowed the brothers to recur to the messenger or spiritual friend not only for things necessary, but also for things useful and convenient (commoda). The order, however, in two general chapters, at Metz, 1249, and at Narbonne, 1260, declined to receive this privilege, inasmuch as it goes farther than the concession of Gregory IX. In the same Bull Innocent IV declares that all things in the use of the friars belong to the Apostolic See, unless the donor has reserved the ownership to himself. A necessary consequence of this disposition was the institution of a procurator by the same pope through the Bull "Quanto studiosius," 19 Aug., 1247 (Bull. Franc., I, 487). This procurator was to act in the name of the Apostolic See as a civil party in the administration of the goods in use of the friars. The faculties of this procurator, or Apostolic syndic, were much enlarged by Martin IV through the Bull "Exultantes in Domino," 18 January 1283 (Bull. Franc., III, 501), especially in regard to lawsuits. The order received the disposition of Martin IV at the chapter of Milan, 1285, but warned at the same time against the multiplication of legal actions (see Franz Ehrle, Archiv für Litteratur- und Kirchengeschichte, VI, 55).

The two most famous Constitutions on the Franciscan rule, which have been inserted in the text of canon law, and which are still in uncontested authority with the Friars Minor, are the Bulls "Exiit qui seminat" of Nicholas III, and "Exivi de Paradiso" of Clement V. The Constitution "Exiit" (c. iii, in VI, lib. V, tit. xii), prepared with the advice of eminent men in and outside the order, given at Soriano near Viterbo, 14 Aug., 1279, treats the whole rule both theoretically and practically. Nicholas III, against the enemies of the order, states that complete expropriation, in common as well as in particular, is licit, holy, and meritorious, it being taught by Christ Himself, although He, for the sake of the weak, sometimes took money. The brothers have the moderate use of things according to their rule. The proprietorship goes to the Holy See, unless the donor retains it. The question of the money is treated with special care. The employment of the messenger and spiritual friend is confirmed and explained. The friars have no right over the money, nor can they call to account an unfaithful messenger. Lest the great number of papal decisions should produce confusion, the pope declares that all former Bulls on the subject are abolished, if they are against the present one. However, this Constitution did not put an end to the questions moved by the more zealous brothers, called Spirituals. It was through their agitation at the papal court at Avignon (1309–1312) that Clement V gave the Constitution "Exivi," 6 May 1312 (c. i, Clem., lib. V, tit. xi). Whilst Angelo Clareno, the head of the Spirituals, rejects all papal declarations on the rule, he speaks well of the Bull "Exivi," "which is among the others like a flying eagle, approaching nearest to the intention of the Founder" (Archiv für Litteratur-und Kirchengeschichte, II, 139). Clement V declares that the Friars Minor are bound to poverty (usus pauper) in those points on which the rule insists. Characteristic of this Bull is the casuistic manner in which the prescriptions of the rule are treated. It declares that St. Francis wished to oblige his brothers under mortal sin in all those cases in which he uses commanding words or equivalent expressions, some of which cases are specified. The Constitutions "Exiit" and "Exivi" have remained fundamental laws for the Franciscans, although they were in the most important point practically suppressed by John XXII, who in his Bull "Ad conditorem canonum," 8 Dec., 1322 (Bull. Franc., V, 233), renounced on behalf of the Apostolic See the proprietorship of the goods of which the order had the use, declaring (according to the Roman law) that in many things the use could not be distinguished from the property. Consequently he forbade the appointment of an Apostolic syndic. Martin V in "Amabiles fructus," 1 Nov., 1428 (Bull. Franc., VII, 712), restored the former state of things for the Observants.

=== Private expositions ===
Only the earliest ones, which had influence on the development of the order, can be mentioned here. The most important is that of the Four Masters, edited at least six times in old collections of Franciscan texts, under the names of Monumenta, Speculum, Firmamenturn (Brescia, 1502; Salamanca, 1506, 1511; Rouen, 1509; Paris, 1512; Venice, 1513). The chapter of the custodes at Montpellier, 1541, had ordered that the solution of some doubts about the rule should be asked for from each province. We know of two expositions of the rule drawn up on this occasion. Eccleston (c. xii, alias xiii, Analecta Francisc., I, 244) speaks of the short but severe exposition which the friars in England sent to the general, beseeching him by the blood of Jesus Christ to let the rule stand as it was given by St. Francis. Unfortunately, the text of this declaration has not been handed down. We have, however, that of the province of Paris, issued on the same occasion by four masters of theology, Alexander of Hales, Jean de la Rochelle, Robert of Bastia, and Richard of Cornwall. The custos Godfried figures only as an official person. This interesting exposition of the rule, and the most ancient, for it was written in the spring of 1242, is short and treats only some dubious points, in conformity with the Bull "Quo elongati" and two later decisions of Gregory IX (1240, 1241). Their method is casuistic. They propose doubts, resolve them, and sometimes leave the questions to the superiors, or invoke a decision of the pope, although they speak twice (c. ii, ix) of the possible danger for the pure observance of the rule, if too many papal privileges are obtained. The work of the Four Masters has had the same effect on subsequent private expositions as the Bull "Quo elongati" had on all following pontifical declarations. The most prolific writer on the Rule of St. Francis was St. Bonaventure, who was compelled to answer fierce adversaries, such as Guillaume de Saint-Amour and others. His treatises are found in the Quaracchi edition of his works, VIII, 1898 (see SAINT BONAVENTURE). The standpoint of St. Bonaventure is observance of the rule as explained by the papal declarations and with wise accommodation to circumstances. He himself exercised great influence on the decretal "Exiit" of Nicholas III.

About the same time as St. Bonaventure, Hugo of Digne (d. about 1280) wrote several treatises on the rule. His exposition is found in the above-mentioned collections, for instance in the "Firmamentum" (Paris, 1512), IV, f. xxxiv, v. (Venice, 1513), III, f. xxxii, v. John of Wales (Guallensis) wrote before 1279 an exposition, edited in "Firmamenturn" (Venice, 1513), III, f. xxviii, v. In his treatise "De Perfectione evangelica," John of Peckham has a special chapter (c. x) on the Franciscan rule, often quoted as an exposition, "Firmamentum," ed. 1512, IV, f. xciv, v; 1513, III, f. lxxii, r. David of Augsburg's sober explanation, written before the Bull "Exiit," is edited in great part by Lempp in "Zeitschrift für Kirchengeschichte," vol. XIX (Gotha, 1898–99), 15-46, 340-360. Another expositor of the Franciscan rule towards the end of the thirteenth century was Pierre Johannis Olivi, who, besides a methodical exposition (Firmamentum, 1513, III, f. cvi, r.), wrote a great number of tracts relating to Franciscan poverty. These treatises, comprised under the name "De perfectione evangelica" are not yet printed in their entirety [see Ehrle, "Archiv für Litteratur-und Kirchengeschichte," III, 497, and Oliger, "Archivum Franciscanum Historicum" (1908), I, 617]. The theories of poverty taught by Olivi exercised great fascination over the Spirituals, especially over Angelo Clareno (d. 1337), whose exposition of the rule will shortly published by the present writer. Of others who directly or indirectly exposed the rule, or particular points of it, we can only name the best known, according to the centuries in which they lived. Fourteenth century: Ubertino of Casale, Gundisalvus of Vallebona, Petrus Aureoli, Bartholomew of Pisa, Bartholo di Sassoferrato (a lawyer). Fifteenth century: St. Bernardine of Siena, St. John Capistran, Cristoforo di Varese (not published), Alessandro Ariosto (Serena Conscientia), Jean Perrin, Jean Philippi. Sixteenth century: Brendolinus, Gilbert Nicolai, Antonio de Cordova, Jerome of Politio (O.Cap.), Francis Gonzaga. Seventeenth century: Peter Marchant, Pedro of Navarre, Mattheucci, De Gubernatis. Eighteenth century: Kerkhove, Kazenberger (several times reedited in nineteenth century), Castellucio, Viatora Coccaleo (O.Cap.), Gabrielle Angelo a Vincentia. Nineteenth century: Benoffi, O.M.Con. (Spirito della Regola de' Frati Minori, Rome, 1807; Fano, 1841) Alberto a Bulsano (Knoll, O.Cap.), Winkes, Maas, Hilarius Parisiensis (O.Cap.), whose learned but extravagant work has been put on the Index of forbidden books. Finally, Bonaventure Dernoye (Medulla S. Evangelii per Christum dictata S. Francisco in sua seraphica Regula, Antwerp, 1657) and Ladislas de Poris (O.Cap.), Meditations sur la Règle des Freres Mineurs (Paris, 1898) have written voluminous works on the rule for purposes of preaching and pious meditation.

The Rule of St. Francis is observed today by the Friars Minor and the Capuchins without dispensations. Besides the rule, both have their own general constitutions. The Conventuals profess the rule "juxta Constitutiones Urbanas" (1628), in which all former papal declarations are declared not to be binding on the Conventuals, and in which their departure from the rule, especially with regard to poverty, is again sanctioned.

== Legacy ==
Non-Catholic organisations have been founded in inspiration of Saint Francis and his rule, e.g. Franciscan spirituality in Protestantism.

== Sources ==
=== Primary sources ===
The original of the Bull "Solet annuere" is preserved as a relic in the sacristy of S. Francesco at Assisi. The text is also found in the registers of Honorius III, in the Vatican Archives.

Facsimiles of both and also of "Exiit" and "Exivi" are published in "Seraphicae Legislationis Textus Originales" (Rome, 1901). The texts alone "Seraphicae Legislationis Textus Originales" (Quaracchi, 1897).

Critical editions of the rules, with introductions on their origin:

- Opuscula S.P. Francisci (Quaracchi, 1904)
- Boehemer, Analekten zur Geschichte des Franciscus von Assisi (Tuebingen, Leipzig, 1904).

The papal decretals on the rule:

- Sbaralea, Bullarium Franciscanum, I-III (Rome, 1759–1765)
- V-VII (Rome, 1898–1904).

English translations of the second and third rule:

- Works of...St. Francis of Assisi (London, 1882), 25-63
- Critical edition: Paschal Robinson, The Writings of St. Francis of Assisi (Philadelphia, 1906), 25-74
- De La Warr, The Writings of St. Francis of Assisi (London, 1907), 1-36.

=== Secondary sources ===
- Carmichael, "The Origin of the Rule of St. Francis" in Dublin Review, CXXXIV, n. 269 (April, 1904), 357-395
- Mueller, Die Anfaenge des Minoritenordens und der Bussbruderschaften (Freiburg im Br., 1895). A good corrective of Mueller is Ehrle, Controversen ueber die Anfaenge des Minoritenordens in Zeitschrift für kath. Theologie (1887), XI, 725-746.
- Mueller, Die Spaltung des Franciscanerordens in die Communitaet und die Spiritualen in Archiv für Litteratur- und Kirchengeschichte (Berlin, 1887), III, 554 sq.
- Schnuerer, Franz von Assisi (Munich, 1905), 81-109.
- Fischer, Der heilige Franziskus von Assisi waehrend der Jahre 1219-1221 (Fribourg, 1907)
- Hilarius Parisiensis, Regula Fratrum Minorum juxta Rom. Pontificum decreta et documenta Ordinis explanata (Lyons, Paris, 1870), X-XXX.
- Sbarlea, Supplementum ad Scriptores Ord. Min. (Rome, 1806), LXIX.
