= Bonaventura of Iseo =

Italian Friar Minor, diplomat, theologist and alchemist

Bonaventura of Iseo (died c. 1273) was an Italian Friar Minor, diplomat, theologist and alchemist.

== Life and work ==
Bonaventura da Iseo played an important role in the Franciscan Order (Ordo Fratrum Minorum) as fiduciary of Elias of Cortona and later of Crescentius of Jesi, whose he was Vicar around the First Council of Lyon in 1245.

Friend of Albertus Magnus and of Thomas Aquinas, he was Franciscan Minister Provincial, in particular in the March of Treviso under Ezzelini.

Bonaventura of Iseo has traditionally been seen as the author of Liber compostille, an alchemical technical textbook. His work illustrates the spread of alchemia in the Italian Franciscan Order.

The Liber Compostille was an alchemical encyclopedia, which represented an attempt to draw together all available knowledge of practical alchemy, as well as to attune the ideas of Albert the Great to those of Roger Bacon with respect to the generation of metals and alchemical transmutation.

— Marco Ciardi, 1999, VIII Convegno Nazionale di Storia e Fondamenti della Chimica
