= Crescentius of Jesi =

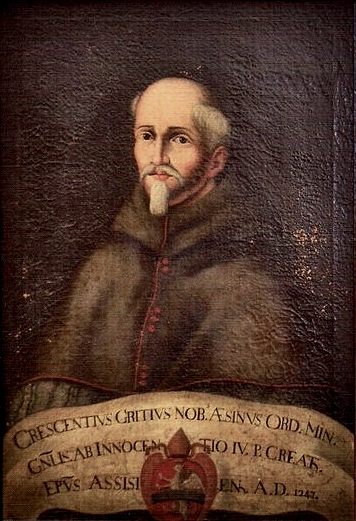

Crescentius of Jesi, O.F.M. (died 1263) of the Grizi family, was an Italian Friar Minor, who became Minister General of the Order of Friars Minor in 1244. He was an opponent of the Franciscan Spirituals, who insisted on an exact following of poverty according to the example of the founder of the Order, St. Francis of Assisi. He was deposed as Minister in 1247 in favour of John of Parma of their party.

During his term as Minister General, Crescentius initiated a systematic search for documentary materials on the life of St. Francis and of the first days of the Order of Friars Minor. He commissioned the Vita secunda (English: Second Biography) of Francis by Friar Thomas of Celano. The accumulated corpus is known as the Assisi Compilation.

Preceded by Haymo of Faversham	Minister General of the Order of Friars Minor; 1244–1247	Succeeded by John of Parma
