= Bonagratia of Bergamo =

Bonagratia of Bergamo (c. 1265–June 19, 1340) was a Franciscan involved in the "poverty of Christ" controversy. As a trained canonist, he supported Michael of Cesena against Pope John XXII.

== Life ==
Bonagratia joined the Franciscans in 1309, having already acquired a degree in canon and civil law. Due to his background in law, Bonagratia became assistant Procurator of the Franciscans at the Avignon Curia. He counseled procurator Raymond of Fronsac in his dealings with the dissident Spiritual Franciscans, and became Procurator in 1319.

Bonagratia was deeply involved in the "poverty of Christ" controversy. It began at Narbonne in 1321, between the Dominicans and Franciscans. The main question at issue seems to have been whether it is heretical to assert that Christ and His Apostles possessed no property either in particular or in common. On account of the important bearing of the controversy on the rule of the Friars Minor, a general chapter of the order was convoked at Perugia, in June of the year 1322, and the minister general, together with the other members of the chapter, caused two letters or communications to be published in which the mind of the chapter regarding the controversy is set forth at considerable length.

Displeased at the action of the chapter at Perugia, Pope John XXII published the Bull "Ad conditorem canonum" in which he renounces the dominion of all the goods of the Friars Minor hitherto assumed by the Roman pontiffs, and echoes Gerard of Abbeville, declaring that the ownership of a thing cannot be separated from its actual use or consumption. The Franciscans objected to this attack on their longstanding beliefs and customs.

The Appellatio magna monacensis, an important manifesto of the group around Michael of Cesena, has been attributed to him.

He had been thrown in prison for his heretical views.

== Sources ==
- Becker, Hans-Jürgen (1969). "BONAGRAZIA da Bergamo". Dizionario Biografico degli Italiani (in Italian). Vol. 11: Boccadibue–Bonetti. Rome: Istituto dell'Enciclopedia Italiana. ISBN 978-88-12-00032-6.
- Eva Luise Wittneben (2003), Bonagratia von Bergamo: Franziskanerjurist und Wortführer seines Ordens im Streit mit Papst Johannes XXII.
