= John of Parma =

Italian Franciscan friar

Blessed John of Parma OFM

Religious Minister General
- Born: 5 March 1208; Commune of Parma, Holy Roman Empire
- Died: 19 March 1289 (aged 81); Camerino, March of Ancona, Papal States
- Venerated in: Roman Catholic Church (Order of Friars Minor)
- Beatified: 1 March 1777 by Pope Pius VI
- Feast: 20 March

Giovanni Buralli (5 March 1208 – 19 March 1289), known as John of Parma, was an Italian Franciscan friar, who served as one of the first Ministers General of the Order of Friars Minor (1247–1257). He was also a noted theologian of the period.

== Life ==
John was born about 1209 in the medieval commune of Parma in the northern Italian region of Emilia-Romagna; his family name was probably Buralli. Educated by an uncle, chaplain of the Church of St. Lazarus at Parma, his progress in learning was such that he quickly became a teacher of philosophy (magister logicæ). When and where he entered the Order of Friars Minor (commonly called the "Franciscans"), the old sources do not say. Affò assigns 1233 as the year, and Parma as the probable place. Ordained a priest, he taught theology at the University of Bologna and the University of Naples, and finally taught the Sentences of Peter Lombard at the University of Paris. He assisted at the First Council of Lyons in 1245, representing the current Minister General, Crescentius of Jesi, who was too ill to attend.

=== Minister General ===
At the General Chapter of the Order held at Lyons in July 1247, John was elected Minister General, at the suggestion of Pope Innocent IV, who had been impressed by him during his service at the Council of Lyons two years earlier. He was elected with the support of the rigorist branch of the Order (known as the Fraticelli), which office he held till 2 February 1257. The desire for the original fervor of the Order animated the new Minister General and of his purposes for the full observance of the Rule of St. Francis, reflects from the joy recorded by Angelus Clarenus among the survivors of Francis's first companions at his election—though Giles of Assisi's words sound somewhat pessimistic: "Welcome, Father, but you come late".

John set to work immediately. Wishing to know personally the state of the Order, he began visiting every community of friars. His first visit was to England, where he was extremely satisfied, and where he was received by King Henry III of England. At Sens in France, King Louis IX (later a member of the Third Order of St. Francis) honored with his presence the Provincial Chapter held by John.

Having visited the Provinces of Burgundy and of Provence, he set out in September 1248, for Spain, whence Pope Innocent recalled him to entrust him with an embassy to the East. Before departing, John appears to have held the General Chapter of Metz in 1249 (others put it after the embassy, 1251). It was at this Chapter that John refused to draw up new statutes to avoid overburdening the friars. Only some new rubrics were promulgated, which in a later chapter in Genoa (1254) were included in the official ceremonial of the Order. The object of John's embassy to the East was reunion with the Eastern Orthodox Church, whose representatives he met at Nice, and who saluted him as an "angel of peace". John's mission bore no immediate fruit, though it may have prepared the way for the union decreed at the Council of Lyons in 1274.

In his generalate occurred also the famous dispute between the mendicants and the Sorbonne University of Paris. According to Salimbene, John went to Paris (probably in 1253), and, by his mild yet strenuous arguments, strove to secure peace. It was in connection with this attack on the Dominicans and the Franciscans that John of Parma and Humbert of Romans, Master General of the Dominicans, published at Milan in 1255 a letter recommending peace and harmony between the two Orders (text in Wadding, 111, 380). In the "Introductorius in Evangelium Æternum" of Gerard of S. Donnino (1254), John's friend, Humbert, was denounced by the professors of Paris and condemned by a commission at Anagni in 1256; John himself was in some way compromised—a circumstance which, combined with others, finally brought about the end of his generalate. He convened a General chapter at Rome on 2 February 1257. If Peregrinus of Bologna is correct, Pope Alexander IV secretly intimated to John that he should resign, and decline reelection should it be offered him, while Salimbene insists that John resigned of his own free will. The pope may have exerted some pressure on John, who was only too glad to resign, seeing himself unable to promote henceforth the good of the Order. Questioned as to the choice of a successor, he proposed Bonaventure, who had succeeded him as professor at Paris.

=== Later life ===
John retired to the hermitage at the famed village of Greccio, near Rieti, memorable for the Nativity scene first introduced there by Francis of Assisi. There he lived in voluntary exile and complete solitude; his cell near a rock is still shown. But another trial awaited him. Accused of Joachimism, he was submitted to a canonical process at Cittá della Pieve (in Umbria), reportedly presided over by Bonaventure and Cardinal Giovanni Gaetano Orsini, Cardinal protector of the Order. The mention of this cardinal as protector brings us to a chronological difficulty, overlooked by writers who assign the process against John to 1257; for Alexander IV (1254–61) retained the protectorship and Orsini became protector, at the earliest, at the end of 1261.

Angelus Clarenus claims that the concealed motive of this process was John's attachment to the literal observance of the Rule; the accusation of Joachimism, against which he professed his Catholic faith, being only a pretext. Other sources, however, speak of retractation. Clarenus relates that John would have been condemned had it not been for the powerful intervention of Innocent IV's nephew, Cardinal Ottoboni Fioschi, later Pope Hadrian V. John certainly did not profess the dogmatic errors of Joachimism, though he may have held some of its apocalyptic ideas.

Upon his acquittal, he returned to Greccio and continued his life of prayer and work. It was there, it is said, that an angel once served his Mass, and that in 1285 he received the visit of Ubertin of Casale, who has left an account of this meeting. Hearing that the Orthodox were abandoning the union agreed upon in 1274, John, now 80 years old, desired to use his last energies in the cause of Christian unity. He obtained the permission of Pope Nicolas IV to go to Greece, but reached only as far as Camerino, in the March of Ancona, where he died in the local friary on 19 March 1289.

He was beatified by Pope Pius VI in 1777; his feast day is celebrated by the Friars Minor on 20 March.

== Works ==
With the exception of his letters, scarcely any literary work can, with surety, be attributed to John.

He is certainly not the author of the "Introductorius in Evangel. Æternum", nor of the "Visio Fratris Johannis de Parma".

The Catholic Encyclopedia speculates that the "Dialogus de vitia SS. Fratrum Minorum", partly edited by L. Lemmens, O.F.M. (Rome, 1902) may be by John. The "Chronicle of the XXIV Generals" ascribes to John the allegoric treatise on poverty: "Sacrum Commercium B. Francisci cum Domina Paupertate" (ed. Milan, 1539), edited by Ed. d'Alençon (Paris and Rome, 1900), who ascribes it (without sufficient reason) to John Parent. Carmichael has translated this edition: "The Lady Poverty, a thirteenth-century allegory" (London, 1901); another English translation is by Rawnsly (London, 1904); a good introduction and abridged version is given by Macdonell, "Sons of Francis", 189-213.

Other works are mentioned by Sbaralea, "Suppl. ad Script." (Rome, 1806), 398.

== Sources ==
- Salimbene, Chronica (Parma, 1857), ed. also by HOLDER-EGGER in Mon. Gern. Hist.: Script., XXXII (Hanover, 1905-8)
- Angelus Clarenus, Chronicon seu Historia septem tribulationum ordinis minorum, partly edited by Franz Ehrle in Arch. Für Litt. u. Kirchengesch., II (Berlin, 1886), 249 sqq., and by Ignaz von Döllinger, Beiträge zur Sektengesch., II (Munich, 1890), 417 sqq
- Anal. Francisce., I (Quaracchi, 1885), 217 sqq.; III (Quaracchi, 1897); Archivum Francisanum Historicum, II (Quaracchi, 1909), 433-39; Bull. Franc., I (Rome, 1759); II (Rome, 1761)
- Suppl. ad Bull. Franc. of Flaminius Annibali de Latera (Rome, 1780)
- Konrad Eubel, editor, Bullarii Franciscani Epitome sive Summa Bullarum (Quaracchi, 1908)
- Collection of good texts, especially referring to missions in the East: Golubovich, Biblioteca bio-bibliografica di Terra Santa, I (Quaracchi, 1906), 219-228
- Luke Wadding, Annales, III, IV (2nd ed., Rome, 1732).
- Anne Macdonell, Sons of Francis (London, 1902), 214-51
- Léon [DE, CLARY], Lives of the Saints and Blessed of the Three Orders of St. Francis, I (Taunton, I885), 493-513.

There are three Italian lives with the title Vita del Beato Giovanni da Parma:

- Camerino (Ravenna, 1730)
- Affò (Parma, 1777)
- Luigi da Parma, 2nd ed. (Quaracchi, 1900)--1st ed. had appeared in the review Beato Giovanni da Parma, Periodico Bimensile (Parmi, 1888-9

Also:

- Ludovico Jacobilli, Vite de' Santi e Beati dell' Umbria, I (Foligno, 1647), 329-34
- Affò in Memorie degli Scrittori c Letterati Parmigiani, I (Parma, 1789), 129-45
- Daunou in Histoire littéraire de la France, XX (Paris, 1842), 23-36 (antiquated)
- Pierre Féret, La Faculté de Théologie de Paris, Moyen Age, II (Paris, 1895), 94-99
- Picconi, Serie Cronologico-Bioqrafica dei Ministri e Vicari Prov. della Minoritica Provincia di Bologna (Parma, 1908), 43-44
- Heribert Holzapfel, Manuale Historiæ Ordinis Fratrum Minorum (Freiburg im Br., 1909), 25-30; German edition (Freiburg im Br., 1909), 28 33
- René de Nantes, Histoire des Spirituels (Paris, 1909), 145 205.

== Notes ==
| Preceded by Crescentius of Jesi | Minister General of the Order of Friars Minor; 1247–1257 | Succeeded by Bonaventure |
