= Capuchin =

Capuchin can refer to:

- Order of Friars Minor Capuchin, an order of Roman Catholic friars
- Capuchin Poor Clares, an order of Roman Catholic contemplative religious sisters
- Capuchin monkey, primates of the genus Cebus and Sapajus, named after the friars
- Capuchin Crypt, a room located beneath the church of Santa Maria della Concezione dei Cappuccini in Rome, Italy
- Capuchins, Erice, a convent in Erice, Italy
- Old Dutch Capuchine, a breed of fancy pigeon
