= Gentile da Foligno =

Italian physician

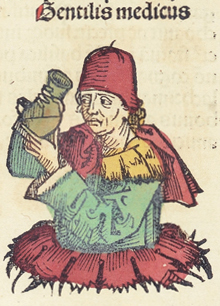
Generic portrait of Gentilis medicus, woodcut in the Nuremberg Chronicle, 1493.

Gentile Gentili da Foligno (died 18 June 1348) was an Italian professor and doctor of medicine, trained at Padua and the University of Bologna, and teaching probably first at Bologna, then at the University of Perugia, Siena (1322–1324), where his annual stipend was 60 gold florins; he was called to Padua (1325–1335) by Ubertino I da Carrara, Lord of Padua, then returned to Perugia for the remainder of his career. He was among the first European physicians to perform a dissection on a human being (1341), a practice that had long been taboo in Roman times. Gentile wrote several widely copied and read texts and commentaries, notably his massive commentary covering all five books of the Canon of Medicine by the 11th-century Persian polymath Avicenna, the comprehensive encyclopedia that, in Latin translation, was fundamental to medieval medicine. Long after his death, Gentile da Foligno was remembered in the Nuremberg Chronicle (1493) as Subtilissimus rimator verborum Avicenne, "that most subtle investigator of Avicenna's teachings"

Other works by Gentile were De complexione, proportione et dosi medicinarum; Consilium de temporibus partus; De statu hominum; De lepra; De febribus; De balneis; De divisione librorum Galeni; Tractatus de reductione medicinarum; Regimen preservativum; Among these the Consilium, a compilation of therapeutic advice for many diseases. He made commentaries on two works, Carmina de urinarum iudiciis ("Songs of urinary judgements") part of a metrical work, the Carmina medica, that had been composed by Egidius Corbaliensis, and Egidius' De pulsibus ("About pulses"). A mark of the respect in which Gentile's work continued to be held, more than a century after his death, was the rapidity with which they appeared in print, from the Italian presses, beginning in the 1470s.

Gentile's commentary de urinarum iudiciis makes a first attempt to comprehend the physiology of urine formation; aided by his dissection of cadavers, Gentile asserted that urine associated with the blood passes per poros euritides ("through the porous tubules") of the kidney and is then delivered to the bladder. Commenting on De pulsibus, he connected the relationship between fast pulse rate and urine output and correlated the color of urine with the condition of the heart. For the originality of his thought Mario Timio suggested that Gentile could be indicated as the 'first' cardionephrologist in the history of medicine.

He prepared a widely read treatise on the Black Death, recommending theriac among other prophylaxis, but died of the plague himself.
