= Jordan of Giano =

Italian Minorite

Jordan of Giano (Latin: Iordanus de Iano; 1195 – after 1262) was an Italian Minorite from Giano in the Valley of Spoleto.

Jordanus joined the Franciscans around 1220. A few years later he was sent to Germany with a group under Caesarius of Speyer, the first Franciscan provincial of Germany. Jordan was first in Salzburg; in June 1222, he was sent to work in the apostolate at Speyer, Worms, and Mainz.

He was ordained in 1223, and became the guardian at Mainz and the custos of the Franciscan houses in Thuringia in 1225. In 1230 and again in 1238, he was sent to Italy on business relating to his order.

He attended a chapter of German Franciscans held at Halberstadt in 1262. There he dictated the early memoirs of the Franciscans in Germany (De primitivorum Fratrum in Theutoniam missorum et conversatione et vita) to a Brother Baldwin of Brandenburg. The memoirs begin in the year 1207 and are one of the chief sources for Franciscan history in Germany. The only extant manuscript breaks off abruptly at the year 1238.
