= Old Dutch Capuchine =

Breed of pigeon

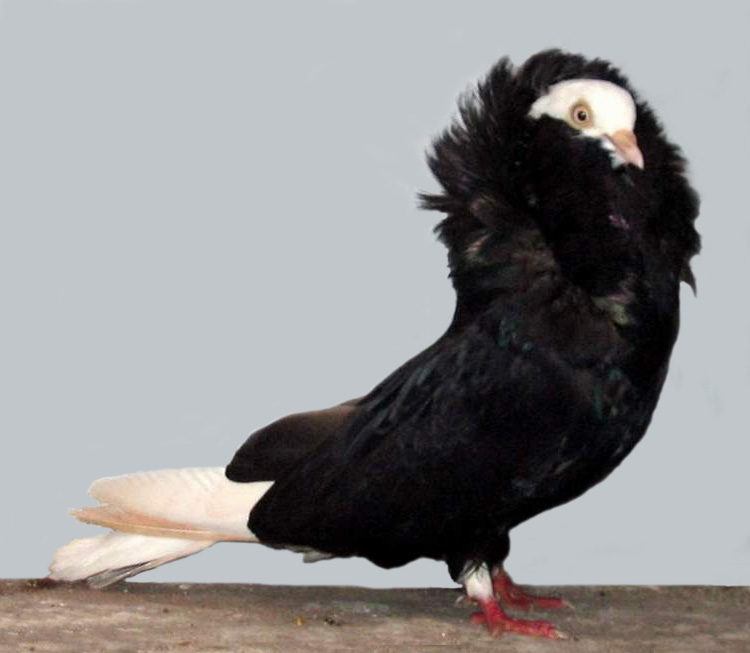
- Black Old Dutch Capuchine
- Conservation status: Common
- Country of origin: Netherlands

Classification
- US Breed Group: Fancy
- EE Breed Group: Structure Pigeons

The Old Dutch Capuchine is a breed of fancy pigeon developed over many years of selective breeding. Old Dutch Capuchines, along with other varieties of domesticated pigeons, are all descendants of the rock dove (Columba livia).

This breed of pigeon is known for its head crest. It is famous in Malaysia and Singapore.

== Gallery ==
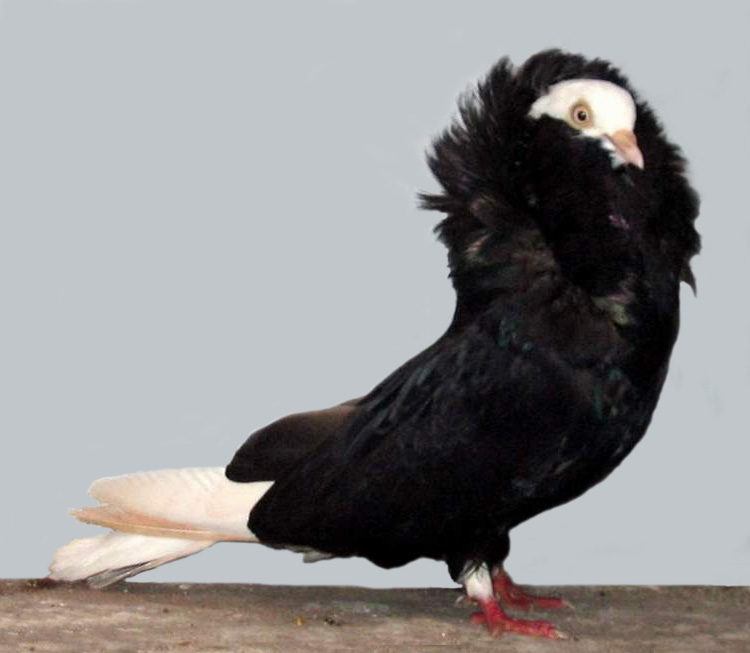
Black

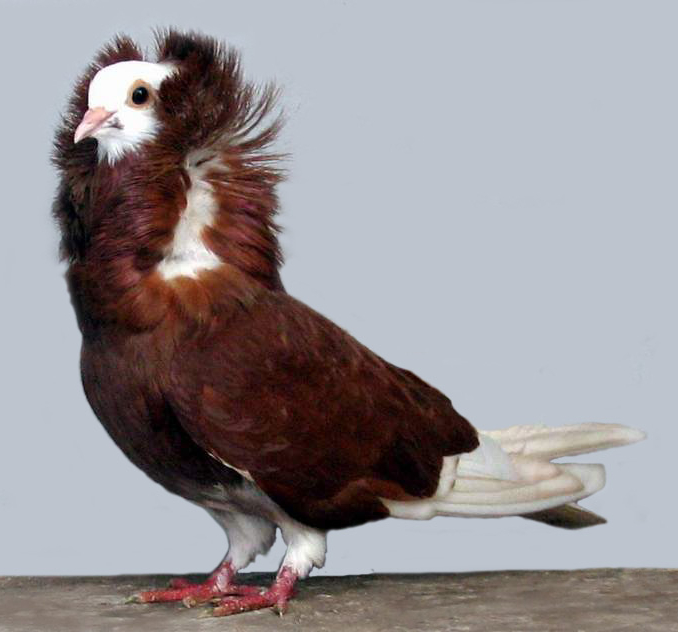
Red

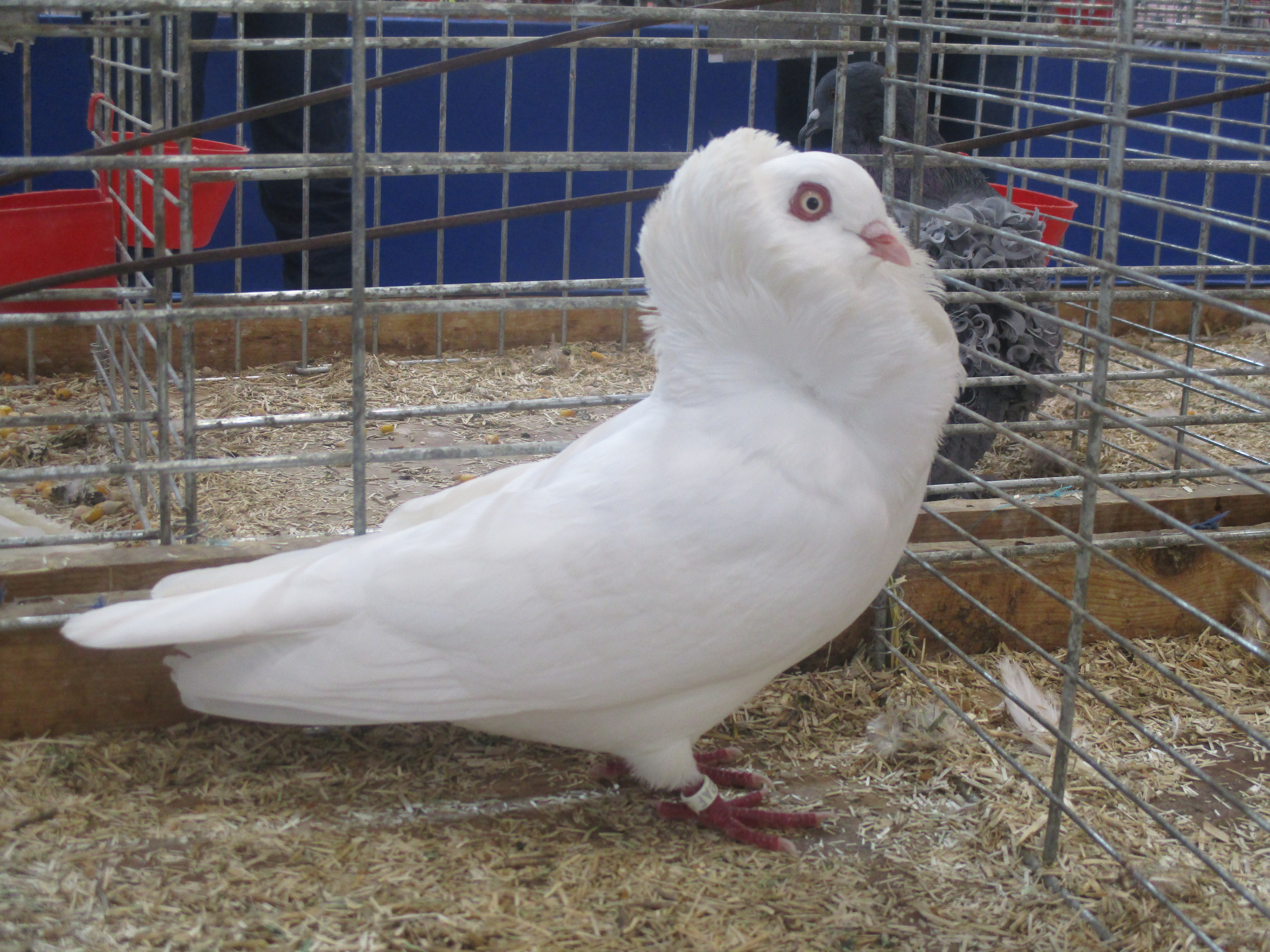
White

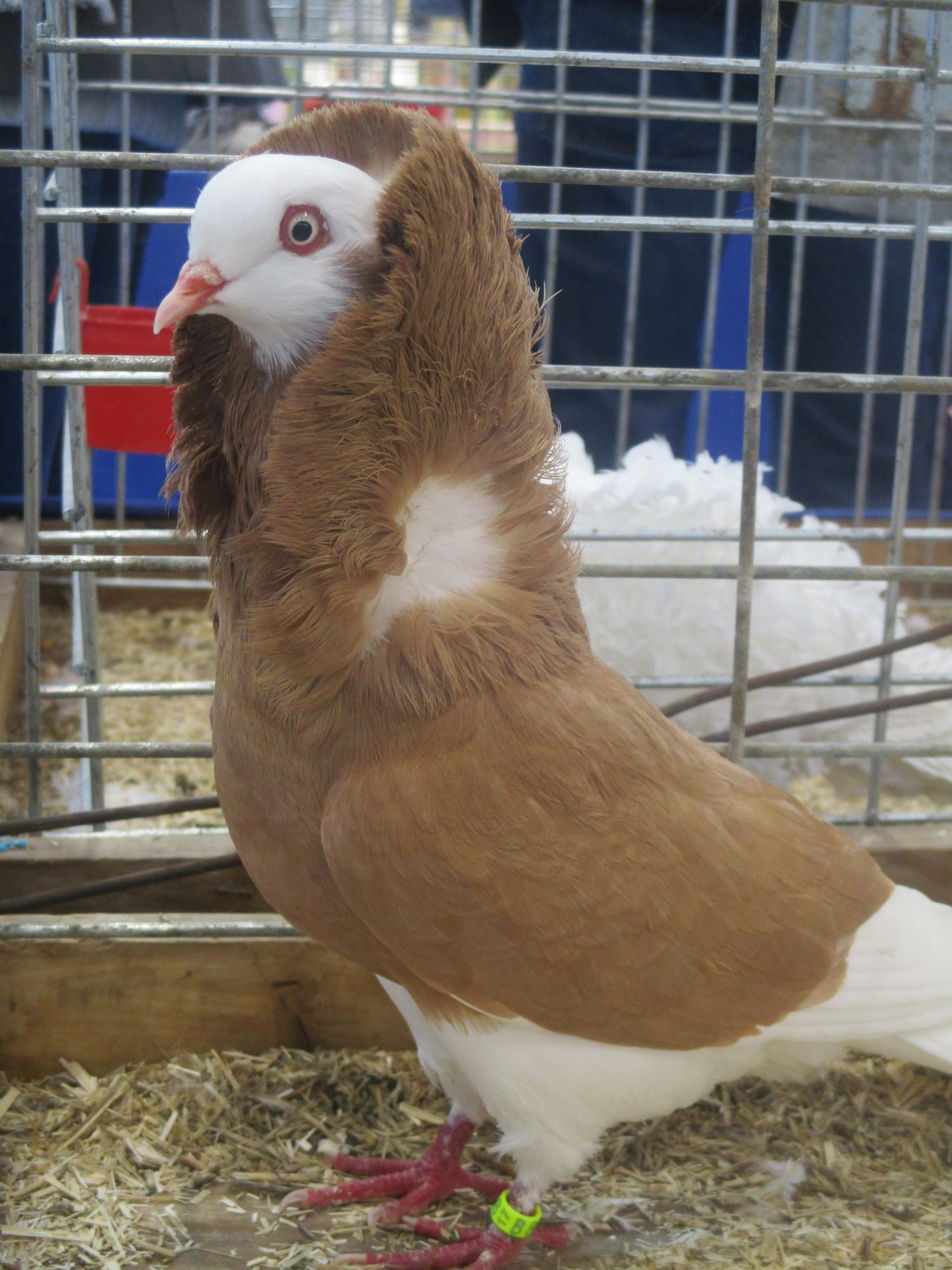
Yellow

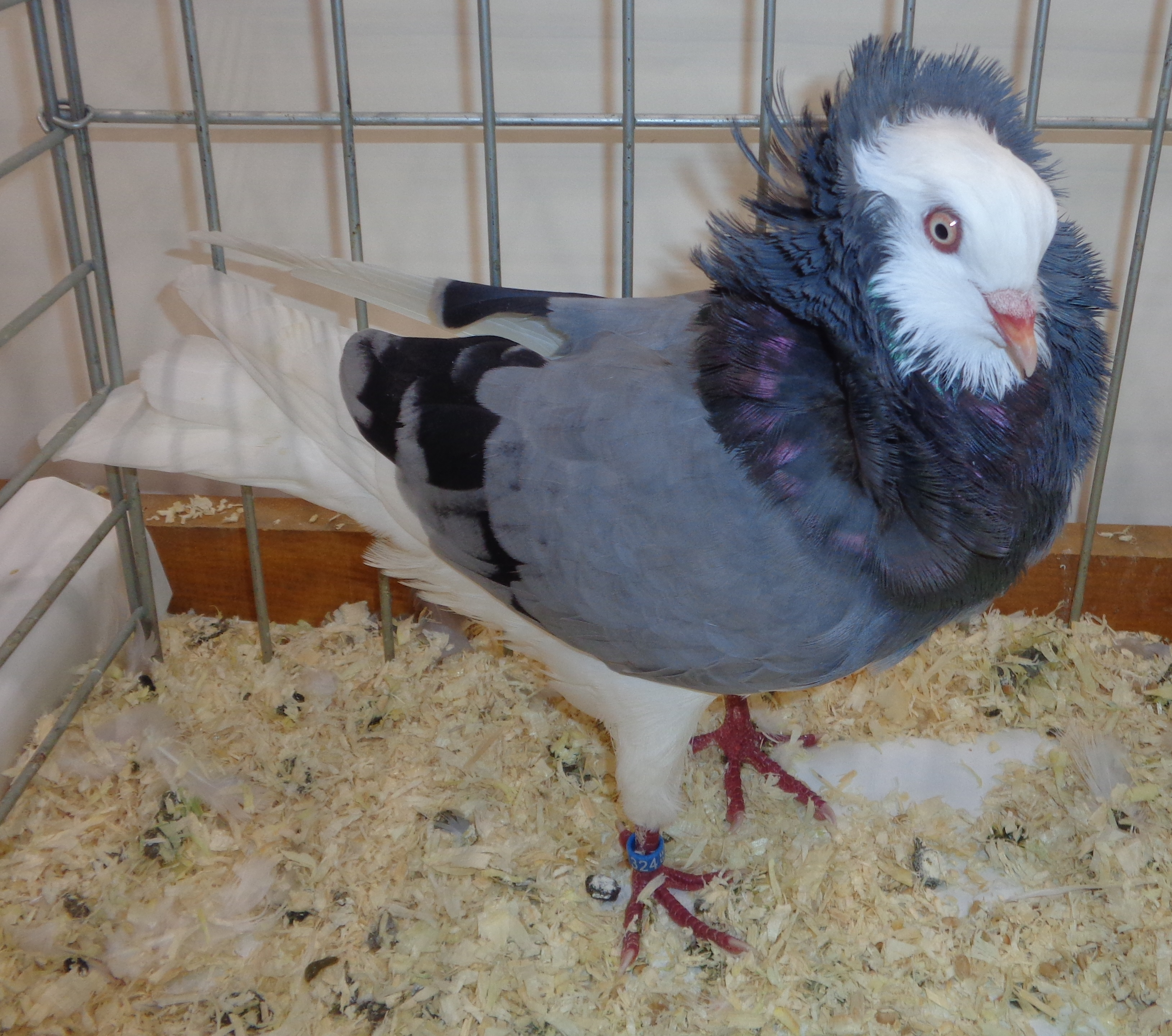
Blue bar

== See also ==
- Pigeon Diet
- Pigeon Housing
- List of pigeon breeds
