= Caesar of Speyer =

Companion of Saint Francis of Assisi

Caesar of Speyer (died 1239) was an early Franciscan who was a companion of Francis of Assisi, and the first Provincial Minister of the Franciscans in Germany. After the death of Francis, he was a leader of the zelanti faction, opposed to what they considered a relaxation of the Rule as promulgated by the founder.

== Life ==
Caesar of Speyer was born towards the close of the twelfth century. He became renowned as a preacher, and the number of women who responded, so enraged their husbands against him that he was obliged to leave his native city. In 1212 he went to Paris, where he studied theology under the famous crusade-preacher Conrad of Speyer. While in the Holy Land in 1217, Caesar was received into the Franciscan Order by Elias of Cortona, the first provincial of Syria. Early in 1221 he returned to Italy with Francis and Peter of Catania.

At the chapter of Pentecost Chapter held at Assisi in 1221, Caesar, together with twenty-five companions, was chosen to go to Germany, and after three months' preparation in the valley of Spoleto, the missionaries set out on their journey northward. They were welcomed by both clergy and people at Trent, Brixen, and other cities. The first Franciscan monastery north of the Alps was founded with the support of Otto I von Lobdeburg, Prince-Bishop of Würzburg. In October of the same year the first provincial chapter of the order in Germany was convoked by Caesar at Worms. The famous missionary, Giovanni da Pian del Carpine, and the chronicler, Jordan of Giano were both present at this chapter; on its conclusion the friars dispersed throughout the different provinces of Germany, according to Caesar's instructions, to meet again the following year.

In 1223 Caesar, accompanied by Thomas of Celano, returned to Assisi to be present at the general chapter of Pentecost, and at his own request was relieved of the office of provincial minister. The Rule of 1223 was probably written by Caesar of Speyer at the dictation of Francis.

Of the remaining fifteen years of Caesar's life little is known. He was probably in Italy, with Bernard of Quintavalle, Giles of Assisi, and the other companions of Francis, encouraging the friars by word and work to remain faithful to their rule and life, and warning them against the innovations of the Relaxati. Jordan of Giano says of Caesar at this time: "He was a man wholly given to contemplation, most zealous for evangelica poverty and so commended by the other friars that he was esteemed the most saintly after St. Francis."

Owing to his opposition towards the Relaxati Caesar was imprisoned by order of the minister general, Elias, and in 1239 met a violent death at the hands of the lay brother who had been appointed to guard him. There seems, however, no warrant for the opinion expressed by some that he was murdered by order of Elias, and the slight colouring which Angelo da Clareno and Ubertino of Casale give to their accounts of his tragic end is due to the bias and bitterness against Elias's party which characterize all the writings of the "Spirituals".
