= Gerard of Abbeville =

13th-century theologian at the University of Paris

Gerard of Abbeville (1220-1272) was a theologian from the University of Paris. He formally became a theologian in 1257 and from then was known as an opponent of the mendicant orders, particularly in the second stage of the conflict, taking part in a concerted attack that temporarily affected their privileges.

== Background ==
His Contra adversarium perfectionis christianae of c. 1269, in support of William of St Amour, argued that extreme emphasis on poverty contradicted the Aristotelian doctrine of the mean and undermined the basis of pastoral work. It provoked replies from Thomas Aquinas and Bonaventure. From the Franciscan side, Bonaventure wrote Apologia pauperum, and John Peckham wrote his Tractatus pauperis. The Dominican Aquinas wrote his case on the "state of perfection" in De Perfectione Vitae Spiritualis contra Doctrinam Retrahentium a Religione (1270).

On trinitarian theology, however, Gerard was much closer to the emerging Franciscan view. With Aquinas, he was one of the developers of the quodlibet genre of open philosophical discussion, flourishing for about a century from his time. His polemics used a combination of quodlibets and sermons.

He was a major benefactor to the Sorbonne library, leaving it around 300 books and manuscripts; his collection was based on that of Richard de Fournival, outstanding in Europe in his time.
