= List of ministers general of the Franciscans =

This is a list of the ministers general of the Franciscans. This includes the Order of Friars Minor, the Order of Friars Minor Conventual, and the Order of Friars Minor Capuchin.

== Ministers general up to 1517 ==
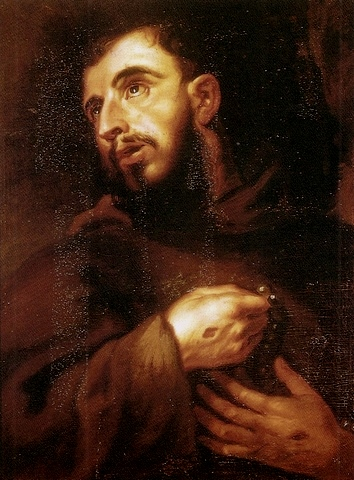
Francis of Assisi (1182–1226), portrait by Giacomo Cavedone, c. 1660

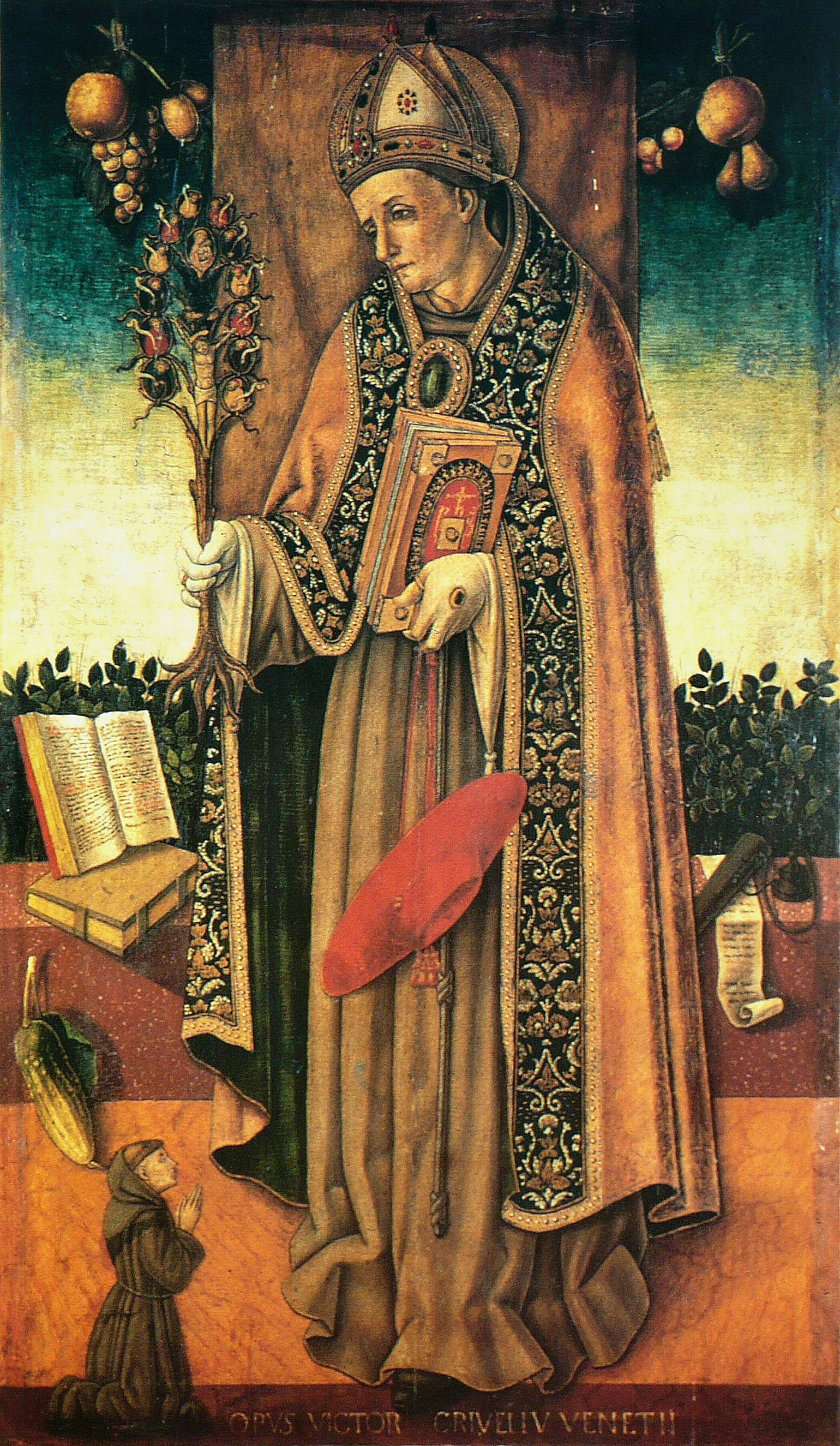
Bonaventure (1221–1274), portrait by Vittore Crivelli (c. 1440-1501)

- Francis of Assisi (1210–1226)
- Giovanni Parenti (1227–1232) 1st Minister general
- Elias of Cortona (1232–1239) 2nd Minister general
- Albert of Pisa (1239–1240) 3rd Minister general
- Haymo of Faversham (1240–1243) 4th Minister general
- Crescentius of Jesi (1244–1247) 5th Minister general
- Johannes of Parma (1247–1257) 6th Minister general
- Bonaventura of Bagnoreggio (1257–1274) 7th Minister general
- Girolamo Masci d'Ascoli (1274–1279), later Pope Nicholas IV, 8th Minister general
- Bonagratia of Bologna (1279–1285), 9th Minister general
- Arlotto of Prato (1285–1287), 10th Minister general
- Matteo de Acquasparta (1287–1289), 11th Minister general
- Raimund Godefroy (1289–1295), 12th Minister general
- Giovanni Mincio of Murrovalle (1296–1304), 13th Minister general
- Gonsalvus Hispanus (1304–1313), 14th Minister general
- Alessandro Bonini di Alessandria (1313–1314), 15th Minister general
- Michael of Cesena (1316–1328), 16th Minister general
  - Cardinal Bertrand de Turre (1328–1329), general Vicar
- Gerardo Odónis (1329–1342), 17th Minister general
- Fortanerio de Vassal (1343–1348), 18th Minister general
- Guillaume Farinier (1348–1357), 19th Minister general
- Juan Bouchier (1357–1358), 20th Minister general
- Marcus of Viterbo (1359–1366), 21st Minister general
- Thomas of Frignano (1367–1372), 22nd Minister general
- Leonardo Rossi (1373–1378), 23rd Minister general

During the Great Schism, the following ministers general headed the order in the Roman obedience:

- Ludovico Donati (1379–1383), 24th Minister general
- Pietro da Conzano (1383–1384), 25th Minister general
- Martino Sangiorgio de Rivarolo (1384–1387), 26th Minister general
- Enrico Alfieri (1387–1405), 27th Minister general
- Antonio Vinitti de Pereto (1405–1408), 28th Minister general
  - Angelo Salvetti (1408–1409), general Vicar
- Antonio da Cascia (1410–1415), 29th Minister general (for the first year general Vicar)
- Antonio Vinitti de Pereto (1415–1420), second appointment

At the same time, the following presided over the order in the obedience of Avignon:

- Angelo di Spoleto (1379–1391)
- John Chevegneyo (1391–1402)
- Giovanni Bardolini (1403–1417)

After the conclusion of the schism, the order was reunited under Antonio Vinitti.

- Angelo Salvetti (1421–1424), 30th Minister general
- Antonio da Massa Marittima (1424–1430), 31st Minister general
- Guillermo Robazoglio da Casale (1430–1442), 32nd Minister general
  - Alberto Berdini de Sarteano (1442–1443) ( general Vicar)
- Antonio Rusconi (1443–1449), 33rd Minister general
- Angel Cristofori del Toscano (1450–1453), 34th Minister general
- Jacob Bassolini de Mozzanica (1454–1457), 35th Minister general
- Jaime Zarzuela (1458–1464), 36th Minister general
- Francesco della Rovere (1464–1469), 37th Minister general, later Pope Sixtus IV.
- Zanetto de Udine (1469–1475), 38th Minister general
- Francesco Nanni called Samson (1475–1499), 39th Minister general
- Egidio Delfini de Amelia (1500–1506), 40th Minister general
- Rainaldo Graziani de Cotignola (1506–1510), 41st Minister general
- Felipe Porcacci de Bagnacavallo (1510–1511), 42nd Minister general
  - Gomez de Lisboa (1511–1512), general Vicar
- Bernardino Prati (1511–1517), 43rd Minister general (for the first year as general Vicar)

== Ministers general of the Friars Minor (OFM) ==
- Cristoforo Numai (1517–1518), 44th Minister general
- Francesco Lichetto (1518–1520), 45th Minister general
- Paolo da Soncino (1520–1523), 46th Minister general (for the first year as general Vicar)
- Francisco de Quiñones, 47th Minister general (1523–1527)
  - Antonio de Calcena (1527–1529), general Vicar
- Paolo Pisotti (1529–1533), 48th Minister general
- Vincenzo Lunello (1535–1541), 49th Minister general
- Giovanni Matteo de Calvi (1541–1547), 50th Minister general
- Andreas Alvarez (1547–1553), 51st Minister general
- Clemente Dolera (1553–1557), 52nd Minister general
  - (An unknown general Vicar) (1557–1559)
- Francisco Zamora de Cuenca (1559–1565), 53rd Minister general
- Aloisio Pozzi da Borgonuovo (1565–1571), 54th Minister general
- Christopher de Chaffontaines (1571–1579), 55th Minister general
- Francisco Gonzaga (1579–1587), 56th Minister general, Chronist
- Francisco de Tolosa (1587–1593), 57th Minister general
- Bonaventura Secusi da Caltagirone (1593–1600), 58th Minister general
- Francisco Susa de Toledo (1600–1606), 59th Minister general
- Arcangelo Gualterio de Messina (1606–1612), 60th Minister general
- Juan Hierro (1612–1613), 61st Minister general
  - Antonio de Trejo (1613–1618), general Vicar
- Benigno de Genova (1618–1625), 62nd Minister general
- Bernardino of Senna (1625–1631), 63rd Minister general
- Giovanni Battista de Campania (1633–1639), 64th Minister general
- Juan Marinero de Madrid (1639–1645), 65th Minister general
- Giovanni Mazzara, 1645–1648, 66th Minister general
- Pedro Manero (1651–1655), 67th Minister general
- Michaelangelo Buongiorno de Sambuca (1658–1664), 68th Minister general
- Ildefonso Salizanes (1664–1670), 69th Minister general
- Francesco Maria Rhini (1670–1674), 70th Minister general
- Francesco Maria Nicolis (1674–1676), 71st Minister general
- Jose Ximenes Samaniego (1676–1682), 72nd Minister general
- Pietro Marini Sormani (1682–1688), 73rd Minister general
- Marcos de Zarzosa (1688–1690), 74th Minister general
- Juan Aluin (1690–1694), 75th Minister general
- Bonaventura Poerio de Taverna (1694–1697), 76th Minister general
- Matteo de Santo Stefano (1697–1700), 77th Minister general
- Luis Torres (1700–1701), 78th Minister general
- Ildefonso Biesma (1702–1716), 79th Minister general
- Jose Garcia (1717–1723), 80th Minister general
- Lorenzo Cozza de S. Lorenzo (1723–1726), 81st Minister general
- Matteo Basile de Parete (1727–1729), 82nd Minister general
- Juan Soto de Valladolid (1729–1736), 83rd Minister general
- Juan Bermejo (1736–1740), 84th Minister general
- Gaetano Politi de Laurino (1740–1744), 85th Minister general
- Rafaello Rossi de Lugagnano (1744–1750), 86th Minister general
- Pedro Juanete de Molina (1750–1756), 87th Minister general
- Clemente Guignoni de Palermo (1756–1762), 88th Minister general
- Pedro Juanete de Molina (1762–1768), 89th Minister general (second appointment)
- Pasquale Frasconi de Varese (1768–1791), 90th Minister general
- Joaquin de Campany i Soler (1792–1806), 91st Minister general
- Ilario Cervelli de Montemagno (1806–1814), 92nd Minister general
- Gaudenzio Patrignani e Coriano (1814–1817), 93rd Minister general
- Cirilo Alameda y Brea (1817–1824), 94th Minister general
- Giovanni Tecca de Capestrano (1824–1830), 95th Minister general
- Luis Iglesias (1830–1834), 96th Minister general
- Bartolome Altemir (1835–1838), 97th Minister general
- Giuseppe Maria Maniscalco (1838–1844), 98th Minister general
- Luigi Flamini de Loreto (1844–1850), 99th Minister general
- Venanzio Metildi de Celano (1850–1856), 100th Minister general
- Bernardino Trionfetti de Montefranco (1856–1832), 101st Minister general
- Rafaele Lippi de Pontecci Marconi (1862–1869), 102nd Minister general
- Bernardino dal Vago da Portogruaro (1869–1889), 103rd Minister general
- Luigi da Parma (1889–1897), 104th Minister general
- Aloysius Lauer (1897–1901), 105th Minister general
  - David Fleming (1901–1915), general Vicar
- Dionysius Schüler (1903–1911), 106th Minister general
- Pacifico Monza (1911–1915), 107th Minister general
- Serafino Cimino da Capri (1915–1921), 108th Minister general
- Bernardino Klumper (1921–1927), 109th Minister general
- Bonaventura Marrani (1927–1933), 110th Minister general
- Leonardo Bello (1933–1944), 111th Minister general
  - Policarp Schmoll (1944–1945), general Vicar
- Valentine Theodore Schaaf (1945–1946), 112th Minister general
- Pacifico Perantoni (1947–1952), 113th Minister general
- Augustin-Joseph Sépinski (1952–1965), 114th Minister general
- Constantin Koser (1965–1979), 115th Minister general (for the first two years as general Vicar)
- John Vaughn (1979–1991), 116th Minister general
- Hermann Schalück (1991–1997), 117th Minister general
- Giacomo Bini (1997–2003), 118th Minister general
- José Rodríguez Carballo (2003–2013), 119th Minister general
- Michael Anthony Perry (2013-2021), 120th Minister general
- Massimo Fusarelli (Since 2021), 121st Minister general

== Ministers general of the Conventuals (OFM Conv.) ==
- Antonio Macelo de Petris de Cherso (1517–1520), 44th Minister general
- Antonio Sassolini (1520–1525), 45th Minister general
- Juan Vigerio (1525–1530), 46th Minister general (first 4 years general Vicar)
- Jaime Antonio Ferduzzi (1530–1537), 47th Minister general (first 4 years general Vicar)
- Lorenzo Spada (1537–1543), 48th Minister general
- Buenaventura Fauni-Pio (1543–1549), 49th Minister general
- Juan Jaime Passeri (1549–1551), 50th Minister general
- Julio Magnani (1551–1559), 51st Minister general (first 4 years general Vicar)
- Juan Antonio Muratori de Cervia (1559–1559), 52nd Minister general
  - Juan Antonio Delfini (1559–1561), general Vicar
- Antonio de' Sapienti (1561–1566), 53rd Minister general (first year as general Vicar)
- Felix Peretti de Montalto (1566–1568), general Vicar, later Pope Sixtus V
- Juan Tancredi (1568–1568), 54th Minister general
- Juan Pico (1568–1574), 55th Minister general (first 3 years general Vicar)
- Pietro Antonio Camilli (1575–1580), 56th Minister general
- Antonio Fera (1581–1584), 57th Minister general
- Clemente Bontadosi (1584–1586), 58th Minister general
- Evangelista Pellei (1586–1590), 59th Minister general (first year as general Vicar)
- Julian Causi (1590–1590), 60th Minister general
- Francisco Bonfigli (1590–1591), 61st Minister general
  - Ludovico Albuzzi (1592–1593), general Vicar
- Felipe Gesualdi (1593–1602), 62nd Minister general
- Jose Pisculli (1602–1607), 63rd Minister general
- Guillermo Huges de Avignon (1608–1612), 64th Minister general
- Jaime Montanari (1612–1622), 65th Minister general (first 5 years general Vicar)
- Miguel Misserotti (1622–1623), 66th Minister general
- Felix Franceschini (1625–1632), 67th Minister general
- Juan Bautista Berardicelli (1632–1647), 68th Minister general (first 3 years general Vicar)
- Miguel Angel Catalani (1647–1653), 69th Minister general
- Felix Gabrielli (1653–1659), 70th Minister general
- Jaime Fabretti (1659–1665), 71st Minister general
- Andres Bini (1665–1670), 72nd Minister general
- Marcial Pelegrini de Castrovilari (1670–1677), 73rd Minister general
- Jose Amati (1677–1683), 74th Minister general
- Antonio Aversani (1683–1689), 75th Minister general
- Jose Maria Bottari, 76th Minister general
- Felix Rotondi (1695–1701), 77th Minister general
- Vicente Maria Coronelli (1701–1707), 78th Minister general
  - Carlo Bacciocchi (1701–1704), general Vicar for Vicente Coronelli
- Bernardino Angelo Carucci (1707–1713), 79th Minister general
- Domingo Andrea Borghesi (1713–1718), 80th Minister general
  - Jose M. Baldrati (1718–1719), general Vicar
- Carlos Jaime Romilli (1719–1725), 81st Minister general
- Jose M. Baldrati (1725–1731), 82nd Minister general
- Vicente Conti (1731–1738), 83rd Minister general
  - Felix Angel Sidori (1738–1741), general Vicar
- Juan Bautista Minucci (1741–1747), 84th Minister general
- Carlos Antonio Calvi (1747–1753), 85th Minister general
- Juan Bautista Costanzo (1753–1759), 86th Minister general
- Juan Bautista Columbini (1759–1764), 87th Minister general
- Domingo Andrea Rossi (1764–1771), 88th Minister general (first year general Vicar)
- Luis Maria Marzoni (1771–1777), 89th Minister general
- Juan Carlos Vipera (1777–1783), 90th Minister general
- Federico Lauro Barbarigo (1783–1789), 91st Minister general
- Jose Maria Medici (1789–1795), 92nd Minister general
- Buenaventura Bartoli (1795–1803), 93rd Minister general
- Nicolas Papini (1803–1809), 94th Minister general
- Jose Maria de Bonis (1809–1824), 95th Minister general
- Luis Battistini (1824–1830), 96th Minister general
- Domingo Secondi (1830–1832), 97th Minister general
  - Francisco Antonio Orioli (1832–1833), general Vicar
- Antonio Pablo Barbetti (1833–1839), 98th Minister general
- Angel Bigoni (1839–1845), 99th Minister general
- Jose Carlos Magni (1845–1851), 100th Minister general
- Jacinto Gualerni (1851–1857), 101st Minister general
- Salvador Calí (1857–1864), 102nd Minister general
- Ludovico Marangoni (1864–1872), 103rd Minister general (first two years as general Vicar)
- Antonio Maria Adragna (1872–1879), 104th Minister general
- Buenaventura Maria Soldatic de Cherso (1879–1891), 105th Minister general
- Lorenzo Caratelli (1891–1904), 106th Minister general
- Dominic Reuter (1904–1910), 107th Minister general
- Victor Maria Sottaz (1910–1919), 108th Minister general
  - Francisco Dall'Olio (1913–1919), general Vicar
- Domingo Maria Tavani (1919–1924), 109th Minister general

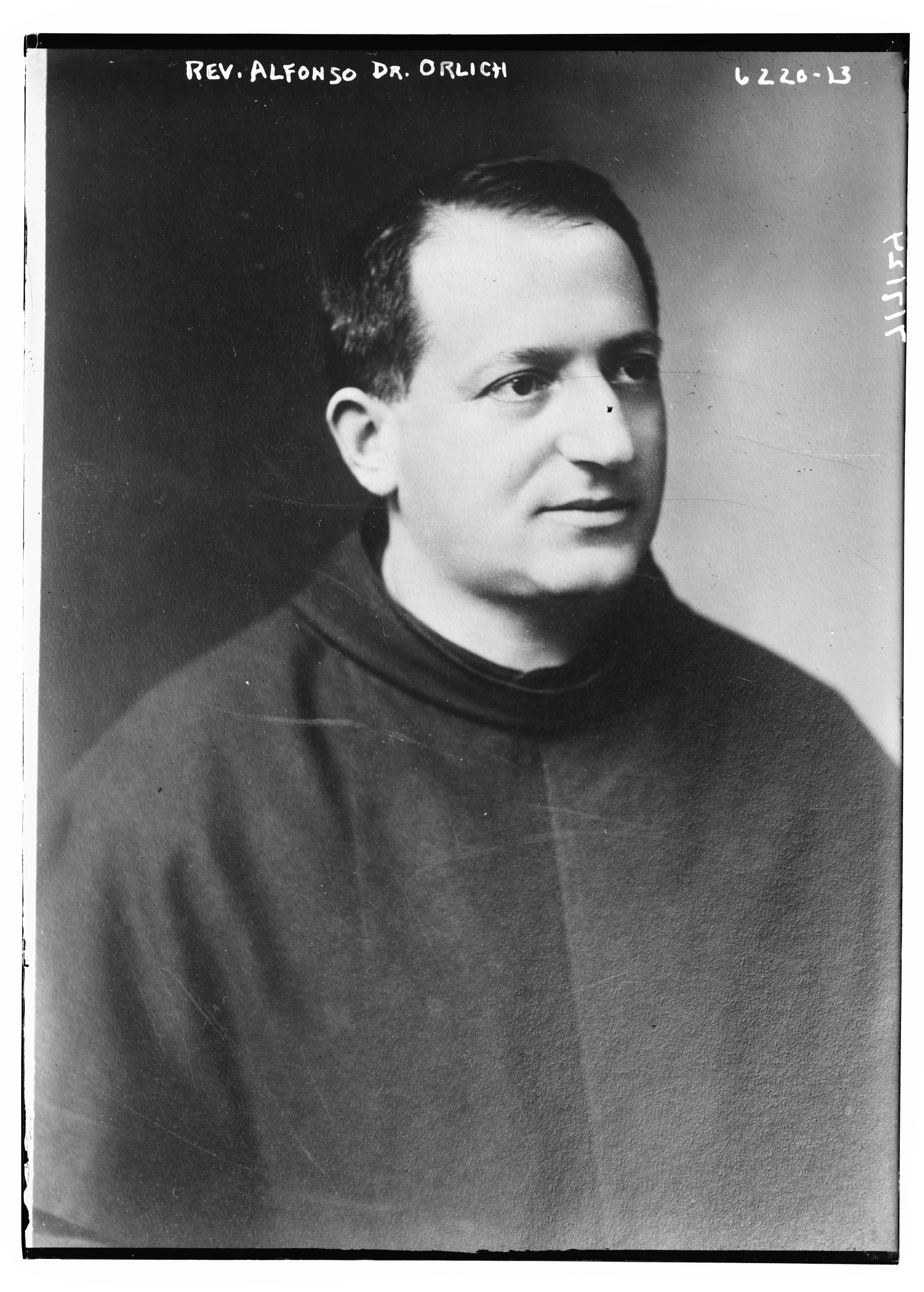
Alfonso Orlich in 1924

- Alfonso Orlich (Orlini) (1924–1930), 110th Minister general
- Domingo Maria Tavani (1930–1936), 111th Minister general (second term of office)
- Beda Maria Hess (1936–1953), 112th Minister general
  - Buenavista Mansi (1953–1954), general Vicar
- Victor Maria Costantini (1954–1960), 113th Minister general
- Basilio Maria Heiser (1960–1972), 114th Minister general
- Vitale Maria Bonmarco (1972–1984), 115th Minister general
- Lanfranco Serrini (1984–1996), 116th Minister general
- Agostino Gardin (1996–2002), 117th Minister general
- Joachim Giermek (2002–2007), 118th Minister general
- Marco Tasca (2007-2019), 119th Minister general
- Carlos Alberto Trovarelli (since 2019), 120th Minister general

== General vicars and ministers general of the Capuchins (OFMcap) ==
- Matteo da Bascio (1529), 1st general Vicar
- Ludovico de Fossombrone (1529–1535), 2nd general Vicar
- Bernardino de Asti (1535–1538), 3rd general Vicar
- Bernardino Ochino (1538–1542), 4th general Vicar
- Francisco de Iesi (1542–1546), 5th general Vicar
- Bernardino de Asti (1546–1552), (second term)
- Eusebio de Ancona (1552–1558), 6th general Vicar
- Tomas de Citta de Castello (1558–1564), 7th general Vicar
- Evangelista de Cannobio (1564–1567), 8th general Vicar
- Mario de Mercato Saraceno (1567–1573), 9th general Vicar, Chronist
- Vicente de Monte d’Olmo (1573–1574), 10th general Vicar
- Jeronimo de Montefiore (1574–1581), 11th general Vicar
- Juan Maria de Tusa (1581–1584), 12th general Vicar
- Santiago de Mercato Saraceno (1584–1587), 13th general Vicar
- Jeronimo da Polizzi (1587–1593), 14th general Vicar
- Silvestre de Monteleone (1593–1596), 15th general Vicar
- Jeronimo de Sorbo (1596–1599), 16th general Vicar
- Jeronimo de Castelferretti (1599–1602), 17th general Vicar
- San Lorenzo da Brindisi (1602–1605), 18th general Vicar
- Silvestre d’Assisi (1605–1608), 19th general Vicar
  - Jeronimo de Castelferetti (1608–1613), 2nd Amtszeit
- Pablo de Cesena (1613–1618), 20th general Vicar
- Clemente de Noto (1618–1619), 21st general Vicar
- Clemente de Noto (1619–1625), Minister general
- Juan Maria de Noto (1625–1631), 22nd Minister general
  - Jeronimo de Narni (1631–1632), general Vicar
  - Francisco de Genova (1632–1634), general Vicar
- Antonio de Modena (1634–1637), 23rd Minister general
- Juan de Moncalieri (1637–1643), 24th Minister general
- Inocencio de Caltagirone (1643–1650), 25th Minister general
- Fortunato de Cadore (1650–1656), 26th Minister general
- Simpliciano de Milan (1656–1662), 27th Minister general
- Marco Antonio de Carpenedolo (1662–1665), 28th Minister general
  - Fortunato de Cadore (1665–1667), general Vicar
- Fortunato de Cadore (1667–1669), (second term)
  - Buenaventura de Recanati (1669–1671), general Vicar
- Esteban de Cesena (1671–1678), 29th Minister general
- Bernardo de Porto Maurizio (1678–1684), 30th Minister general
  - Buenaventura de Recanati (1684–1685), general Vicar
- Carlos Maria de Macerata (1685–1691), 31st Minister general
- Bernardino de Arezzo (1691–1698), 32nd Minister general
- Juan Pedro de Busto Arsizio (1698–1700), 33rd Minister general
  - Angelicus von Wolfach (1700–1702), general Vicar
- Agustin de Latisana (1702–1709), 34th Minister general
- Bernardino de Saluzzo (1709–1710), 35th Minister general
  - Juan Antonio de Florencia (1710–1712), general Vicar
- Miguel Angel de Ragusa (1712–1719), 36th Minister general
- Juan Antonio de Florencia (1719–1721), 37th Minister general
  - Bernardino de Sant'Angelo in Vado (1721–1726), general Vicar
- Hartman de Bressanone (1726–1731), 38th Minister general
- Buenventura de Ferrara (1731–1740), 39th Minister general
- Jose Maria de Terni (1740–1747), 40th Minister general
- Segismundo de Ferrara (1747–1753), 41st Minister general
  - Gelasio de Gorizia (1753–1754), general Vicar
- Serafin von Ziegenhals (1754–1761), 42nd Minister general
- Pablo de Colindres (1761–1766), 43rd Minister general
  - Jose Maria de Savorgnano (1766–1768), general Vicar
- Amado de Lamballe (1768–1773), 44th Minister general
- Erhard de Radkesburg (1773–1789), 45th Minister general (first two years general Vicar)
- Angelico de Sassuolo (1789–1796), 46th Minister general
- Nicolas de Bustillo (1796–1806), 47th Minister general
- Miguel Angel de San Sepolcro (1806–1814), 48th Minister general
  - Mariano de Alatri (1814–1818), general Vicar
- Francisco de Solchaga (1818–1824), 49th Minister general
- Ludovico de Frascati (1824–1830), 50th Minister general
- Juan de Valencia (1830–1838), 51st Minister general
- Eugenio de Rumilly (1838–1844), 52nd Minister general
- Luis de Bagnaia (1844–1845), 53rd Minister general
  - Andres de Arezzo (1845–1847), general Vicar
- Venancio de Turin (1847–1853), 54th Minister general
- Salvador de Ozieri (1853–1859), 55th Minister general
- Nicolas de San Juan en Marignano (1859–1872), 56th Minister general
- Gil de Cortona (1872–1884), 57th Minister general
- Bernardo de Andermatt (1884–1908), 58th Minister general
- Pacifico de Seggiano (1908–1914), 59th Minister general
- Venancio de Lisle-en-Rigault (1914–1920), 60th Minister general
- Juan Antonio de San Juan en Persiceto (1920–1926), 61st Minister general
- Melchor de Benisa (1926–1932), 62nd Minister general
- Virgilio de Valstagna (1932–1938), 63rd Minister general
- Donatus von Welle (1938–1946), 64th Minister general
- Clement of Milwaukee (1946–1952), 65th Minister general
- Benigno de S. Ilario Milanese (1952–1958), 66th Minister general
- Clement of Milwaukee (1958–1964), 67th Minister general (second term)
- Clementinus von Vlissingen (1964–1970), 68th Minister general
- Pascual Rywalski (1970–1982), 69th Minister general
- Flavio Roberto Carraro (1982–1994), 70th Minister general
- John Dennis Corriveau (1994–2006), 71st Minister general
- Mauro Jöhri (2006-2018), 72nd Minister general
- Roberto Genuin (since 2018), 73rd Minister general
