= Giovanni Mincio =

Giovanni Mincio may refer to:

- Giovanni Mincio of Tusculum, antipope Benedict X
- Giovanni Mincio of Morrovale, Franciscan and cardinal
