= Giacomo Bini =

Franciscan priest (1938–2014)

- Minister General of the Order of Friars Minor
- Installed: 1997
- Term ended: 2003
- Predecessor: Hermann Schalück
- Successor: José Rodríguez Carballo

Orders
- Ordination: 14 March 1964

Personal details
- Born: Giacomo Bini; 23 August 1938 Ostra Vetere
- Died: 9 May 2014 (aged 75) Rome
- Denomination: Roman Catholic
- Education: Institut Catholique de Paris; University of Strasbourg

Giacomo Bini (23 August 1938 – 9 May 2014) was a Franciscan priest. Ordained in 1964, he worked as a missionary in Africa, and was appointed Minister General of the Order of the Friars Minor (OFM) for the period 1997–2003. He was fluent in Italian, French, English, Spanish, and Kiswahili.

== Early life ==
Bini was born in Ostra Vetere, Ancona in 1938. He entered a seminary at an early age, where he received his secondary education, and entered the Franciscan order on 18 September 1956, at the age of 18. He made his Solemn Profession on 7 September 1963, and was consecrated to the priesthood on 14 March 1964. He subsequently pursued further studies in both Paris, where he attended the Institut Catholique for two years, and at Strasbourg, where he obtained the title of Doctor in Religious Sciences at the University of Strasbourg in 1971. His thesis was entitled Sin and Penance in St. Basil of Caesarea. His early roles ranged from Definitor, instructor in liturgy at the regional seminary of Fano, master of studies for prospective friars undergoing their novitiate, provincial vicar of the Marche region, and both guardian and parish priest at Urbino.

== Rwanda mission ==
In 1982, after expressing a wish to participate in the Africa project of his order, he was incardinated the Vice Province of St. Francis of Africa and Madagascar to establish the Rwanda Order of Friars Minor. Bini's functions were those of Definitor and Vicar Provincial. The project envisaged three principles:

- Living as a Franciscan fraternity dedicated to listening and service for reciprocal conversion;
- To embody the charismatic ideal of Franciscan poverty and service to the poor, while maintaining close communion with the local Church.
- To live in a small parish in a poor area.

Bini, together with Brother Raoul de Buisseret and Brother Anselmo Doglio arrived in Rwanda on 21 February 1983, and were soon joined by two other brothers, Vjeko Curic, and Paolo Lombardo, in August of the same year. Each represented different traditions of the Franciscan order, according to the impression of a Rwandan who served his postulancy with them. Monsignor Perraudin, Bishop of Kabgayi, offered them a choice for their mission between Musambira or a base on a hilltop near the smaller town of Kivumu closer to the city of Gitarama in the Muhanga District. They chose the latter, and, while mastering Kiswahili at Kigali, built with local help a friary at Kivumu, which was inaugurated in January 1984. On 7 October 1984 the parish of "St. Mary of the Angels" was established with Giacomo Bini as its first parish priest. Their ministries differed in emphasis: fra Anselmo tendered the mission's gardens and chickens; fra Vjeko Curic befriended the local children and youth; fra Raoul did pastoral work among the Kivumu community, while Bini was happiest among the poorest and the outcast, working with them in their patches of cultivated land.

The new community kept close communion with the Poor Clares, who had established a mission in Kamonyi in 1982, and some years later (1986) with a Belgian order, the Franciscan Sisters of the Kingdom of Jesus, who were based in Zaire. Bini superintended vocational training for several years, both in Rwanda and Tanzania. Among 100 young Rwandans desiring to entering the novitiate, just five were selected for postulancy, the first group on 29 September 1985. From 1993 to 1997 he served as Provincial Minister of the Vice Province of St. Francis of Africa and Madagascar in Nairobi. Shortly after his appointment, in 1994 a wave of genocidal violence against the Tutsi ethnic minority broke out. Br. Georges Gashugi, a Rwandan friar on the eve of his consecration, was hauled from a truck in late April 1994, identified as a Tutsi and slaughtered: his last wish, to be allowed to die in his Franciscan tunic, was denied. One of the earliest missionaries, from Croatia, Vjeko Curic, who had gone on to master the Kinyarwanda language of Rwanda, proved instrumental in both saving many Tutsi from falling victims of the genocide and in helping Hutus who had been later targeted for revenge when the first wave of violence passed, was shot dead, reportedly by a hired gunman whom he had formerly helped, in Kigali on 31 January 1998. His funeral was attended by thousands of Africans, and members of both the Islamic and Jewish communities. In his address on the occasion as Minister General of the order, Bini recalled that Vjeko had predicted months earlier that, 'those whom I saved will kill me'; Bini cited the Gospel of St John (10, 17b-18a):

No one takes [my life] from me; I lay it down of my own free will.

== Minister General ==
On 14 May 1997, at the General Chapter meeting at St. Mary of the Angels near Assisi Bini was elected the successor of St Francis and leader of the worldwide Order of Franciscan Friars, a role he covered for a period of six years, until 2003. During his superintendence, as part of a renewal of old links between the Tuscan chapter of the Franciscans and the people of Lithuania, a Franciscan hermitage was established in July 2000 on the Hill of Crosses near Šiauliai, and for the occasion Pope John Paul II wrote a letter of appreciation to Bini and his confrères.

As head of the Franciscan Order, which is the official Catholic 'custos of the Holy Land', he was active in seeking to resolve diplomatically the impasse created during the Israeli siege of the Church of the Nativity in Bethlehem in 2002 during the Al-Aqsa Intifada. He was present at Mount Nebo to greet Pope John Paul II at his starting point for his pilgrimage to Israel, Jordan and the Palestinian Authority. Subsequently, on the occasion of the General Chapter Meeting of 2003, the Pope addressed Bini and his order in an extended letter covering their functions and mission.

== 2003–2014 ==
In 2007, Bini established a European Missionary Fraternity in Palestrina, closely bound to a similar entity in Istanbul, in the wake of discussions conducted at a General Curia seminar the preceding year dedicated to evangelization in Europe. The aim was to develop the definitional "contemplative Fraternity in mission" of the order in two directions: one consisted in striving to create a community that would 'live the Rule', engaging in contemplative prayer, physical labour and missionary adventure which, at the same time, would aggregate postulants from around the world; the other was premised on the idea of establishing a presence within its chosen area, to serve as a basis for inter-faith dialogue and ecumenical life. Freedom in simplicity—a refusal of television, cars, and hired help within the monastic domain—trust in providence and a valorization of individual and cultural diversity were to be important elements of the new community. In itinerant missionary work, one must go forth penniless, in conformity with the original Gospel principles laid down by Christ, and confide one's trust in the provision and benefactions of chance. The missionary activity has since extended its reach throughout Europe, from Spain and France, to Poland and Lithuania, and has reached out to gypsy communities.

Bini was also active in advocating the development of a renewed relationship, based on 'theocentric complementarity', between the Franciscan order and the Sisters of St Claire. Both orders, he argued, from their common roots are "ecstatic", in a nomadic pursuit of a humble, theocentric lifestyle based on "expropriation", by which he means a mode of humble existence "sine proprio" (void of all personal attachments). The ascetic discipline conjoins self-impoverishment with an itinerary of seeking a flourishing matrix of relationships with others in a charismatic fraternity. This was the original legacy bequeathed by St. Francis and St. Claire, one that the world easily depauperates, but which, in his vision, the orders have jealously guarded for eight centuries. He admits however, that his own order has, in the past, neglected this foundational tradition of formative dialogue with its sister order. An 'intrusive "masculism" or exaggerated feminism may have facilitated this separation' in the past, and Bini argues for the urgency of renovating the relationship between a feminine order that undertook a vow of obedience to St. Francis, and the Franciscan order which assumed the responsibility to care for the sisters of the poor. Both orders began by a reciprocal trust which, while subordinating itself to the primary loyalty of the Church, "instilled in her a seed of gospel folly", an evangelical folly which has played an important role on several occasions in refreshing the vigour of the wider Catholic order. In a return to their complementarity, Bini sees an important resource for the evangelical renewal of the Church itself.

He died, after a brief illness, on 9 May 2014. After a funeral mass celebrated by the present Minister General of the Order, Fr. Michael Perry, on 12 May at the Church of the Franciscan Sisters Missionaries of Mary in Grottaferrata, he was buried in the family tomb at Marino.

== See also ==
- List of ministers general of the Order of Friars Minor

== Bibliography ==
- Bini, Giacomo (2005). Audite, sorelle: Un itinerario per rifondare la vita consacrata (2nd ed.). Padova: Memoria e Profezia. ISBN 978-88-250-1274-3.
- Bini, Giacomo (2010). Ritorno alla intuizione evangelica francescana. collana Presenza di S. Francesco. Biblioteca Francescana Edizioni.
- Bini, Giacomo (2011a). Un'esistenza unificata e pacifista in Dio: Sentieri di vita francescana oggi. Milan: Edizioni Biblioteca Francescana.
- Bini, Giacomo (2011b). "Foundation of Blessed Egidio of Assisi. European Missionary Fraternity in Palestrina (RM)". Rome: Vidimus Dominum. Archived from the original on 14 May 2014.
- Bini, Giacomo (11 February 2012). "Reciprocity and relationship between the OFM and OSC". Ordo Fratrum Minorum. Archived from the original on 24 September 2015.

== Sources ==
- "Br. Giacomo Bini, OFM passed away". Ordo Fratrum Minorum. 9 May 2014a. Archived from the original on 24 September 2015.
- "Congratulations to the new Franciscan Minister General". American Catholic. 1997.
- "Fr. Giacomo Bini, OFM: "La vita continua"". Ordo Fratrum Minorum. 12 May 2014b. Archived from the original on 24 September 2015.
- "Franciscan Friar Assassinated in Rwanda". OFM. 1 February 1998. Archived from the original on 29 September 2013.
- "Franciscan proposal to end the siege of the basiica in Bethlehem". Zenit News Agency. 11 April 2002.
- "In Memory of Fr Vijeko Curic OFM - the funeral ceremony at Kivumu". Order of Friars Minor. 6 February 1998. Archived from the original on 5 December 1998.
- Klenicki, Leon (2000). "Pope John Paul II: Visit to Jordan, Israel and the Palestinian Authority, a pilgrimage of prayer, hope and reconciliation" (PDF). Anti-Defamation League. Archived from the original on 5 March 2016.
- "Letter to Father Giacomo Bini". John Paul II Foundation. 11 July 2000. Archived from the original on 4 March 2016.
- "Message of John Paul II to the Minister General of the Order of Friars Minor".
- "The Minister General Friar Giacomo Bini OFM: Curriculum Vitae". OFM.org. 31 December 1997. Archived from the original on 24 September 2015.
- "Minister General of the Franciscans arrive for Papal visit". Christus Rex. 19 March 2000.
- "Monks urge end to Bethlehem siege". BBC News. 12 April 2002.
- Ngomanzungu, fra Kizito (27 April 2010). "The Journey of my Vocation with the Friars". Vjeka-rwanda.
- Perić, Fra Ivica. "History of Friars in Rwanda".
- "Rwanda Order of Friars Minor". Province of St. Francis in Africa, Madagascar & Mauritius. Archived from the original on 27 September 2013.
