= Bonagratia =

Bonagratia may refer to:

- Bonagratia of Bergamo (c. 1265–1340), Franciscan involved in the "poverty of Christ" controversy
- Bonagratia de San Giovanni in Persiceto (fl. 1278–1283), Italian Friar Minor, who became Minister General of the Order
