= Joachim Giermek =

American Franciscan Father (1943–2024)

- Born: April 2, 1943; Buffalo, New York
- Died: January 5, 2024 (aged 80); Ellicott City, Maryland

Joachim Giermek (April 2, 1943 – January 5, 2024) was an American Franciscan Father who was the Minister General of the Conventuals (OFM Conv.) and the first to be of Polish ancestry. He was elected in 2001 and served until 2007. He was involved in the Franciscan peace efforts.

Giermek was born in Buffalo, New York, on April 2, 1943, and died in Ellicott City on January 5, 2024, at the age of 80.
