= Gerardus Odonis =

French theologian

Geraldus Odonis, Guiral Ot in Occitan, (1285, Camboulit, department of Lot – 1349, Catania, Sicily) was a French theologian and Minister General of the Franciscan Order.

== Life ==
His name appears in medieval manuscripts as Geraldus slightly more frequently than Gerardus. This form is also closer to the vernacular form Guiral Ot found in a poem by the Toulouse troubadour Raimon de Cornet.

He was certainly born in Camboulit, (1285 d.C.) into a family to which also belonged Bertrand de la Tour, another important Franciscan closely connected to John XXII, and made cardinal in 1320. Geraldus joined the Franciscan order at Figeac. He is first seen active as a teacher at the Toulouse studium in 1316, and probably remained there up until he was sent as a baccalaureus in Paris, in 1326, incepting as a Master in theology some time before 10 June 1329, when he was elected minister general of the order at the general chapter held in Paris. The presiding officer of this chapter was Cardinal Bertrand de la Tour, whom Pope John XXII had appointed vicar-general of the order. The previous minister general, Michael of Cesena, had been deposed by John XXII on 6 June 1328. The general chapter held at Paris (1329) took a position, in the name of the entire order, on the side of the pope and formally expelled the small party made up of Michael of Cesena's adherents.

At the general chapter of Perpignan (1331), Odonis and fourteen provincial ministers presented a petition to John XXII on the issue of poverty which the pope rejected in the consistory of 1 August 1331. Owing to his views concerning poverty Geraldus also became entangled in a dispute with King Robert and Queen Sanzia of Naples and Sicily. These rulers were protectors of the rigid adherents to the rule of poverty as well as of the followers of Michael of Cesena and of the Fraticelli. Notwithstanding the papal letters of admonition and the fact that John XXII sent Geraldus Odonis as his representative to the Court of Naples in 1331 and the following year, Geraldus had new statutes drawn up. These regulations were confirmed, 28 November 1336, by Pope Benedict XII(1334–42); consequently Geraldus was able at the chapter held at Cahors, 7 June 1337, to obtain, in spite of strong opposition, the enactment of the so-called "Constitutiones Benedictinae". Nevertheless, he was in danger of being removed from his position, nor did the statutes remain in force longer that the lifetime of Benedict XII and the period during which Gerardus was general. The general chapter of Assisi abrogated, 1 June 1343, the "Constitutiones Benedictinae" and re-enacted, with some additions, the constitutions of Narbonne (1260).

In union with the pope, Geraldus Odonis promoted Franciscan missions, constantly sending fresh missionaries to Persia, Georgia, Armenia (1329); Malabar (1330), China and Tatary (1331); Bosnia (1340).

In 1329 John XXII sent him to King Charles I of Hungary and to Ban Stephen II of Bosnia for the purpose of bringing about the extermination of the heretics, largely Patarenes, in these countries. On 5 September 1333, Gerardus and the Dominican Arnauld de Saint-Michel (Arnauldus de S. Michaele) were appointed papal legates to make peace between the Kings of England and Scotland. The procurator of the Scottish king in Paris having reported, however, that his master was not to be found in Scotland, John recalled the commission of the legates, 31 October 1333.

Geraldus remained in Paris and defended before a large number of professors of the university, on 18 December 1333, the opinion of John XXII concerning the Visio beatifica, namely, that the saints do not enjoy complete beatific vision until after the Last Judgment. The University of Paris was greatly agitated by the controversy, and the next day, 19 December, Philip VI of France called together twenty-nine professors at Vincennes to discuss the question. This assembly dissented from the opinion of the pope, as did also a second assembly which met 2 Jan., 1334. John XXII withdrew his opinion, 3 December 1334.

Geraldus Odonis was also one of the commission of sixteen masters of theology which met by command of Benedict XII from 4 July to 4 Sept., 1334, at Pont-Sorgues near Avignon, to discuss, under the pope's presidency, the question of the Visio beatifica. On 27 Nov., 1342, Benedict XII appointed him Patriarch of Antioch and at the same time Bishop of Catania in Sicily.

== Black Death ==
In October 1347 the Black Death arrived in the nearby Sicilian port of Messina. The Messinese asked Gerardus Odonis for the relics of St Agatha to be moved from Catania to Messina. He agreed to this, but the citizens of Catania did not. As a compromise Gerardus dipped the relics in water and personally took the water to Messina. After his return from Messina Gerardus himself died of the black death. He was buried in the cathedral at Catania.

== Works ==
Apart from the "Constitutiones Benedictinae" and the "Officium de stigmatibus S. Francisci", still recited in the Franciscan Order and commonly attributed to Gerardus, the best known of his writings is his "Commentarius [Expositio] in Aristotelis Ethicam" (Brescia, 1482, Venice, 1500). This work brought him the honour later of being called Doctor Moralis. He also wrote on logic and a treatise entitled "Philosophia Naturalis", in which he is said to have apparently taught Atomism; another work was a "Commentarius in IV libros Sententiarum". Among his exegetical works are: "De figuris Bibliorum", and treatises on the Psalter, the First Epistle to the Corinthians, and the Epistle to the Galatians, besides "Sermones". In addition to taking severe measures against the adherents of the deposed Michael of Cesena, Gerardus addressed to the latter the writing "Quid niteris", to which, however, Cesena soon made a rejoinder beginning "Teste Salomone".

== Notes ==
Catholic Church titles
Preceded by Bertrand de Turre as Vicar general	Minister General of the Order of Friars Minor; 1329–1342	Succeeded by Fortanerio de Vassal
