= Valentine Theodore Schaaf =

Valentine Theodore Schaaf OFM (March 18, 1883-December 1, 1946) was a Catholic priest from Ohio, USA. In the 1920s he wrote The Cloister. He became Dean of the school of canon law at The Catholic University of America and, from 1945 to 1946, a General Minister of the Friars Minor (OFM). A scholarship fund is named for him.
