= John Vaughn (Franciscan) =

Franciscan friar, 116th General Ministers of the Friars Minor (1928–2016)

John David Vaughn (1928 – October 10, 2016) was the 116th General Ministers of the Friars Minor (OFM) and served from 1979 to 1991. He also served as vice-postulator for the cause of canonizing Junípero Serra.
