= José Rodríguez Carballo =

Spanish prelate

His Excellency, The Most Reverend José Rodríguez Carballo OFM
- Archbishop of Mérida-Badajoz
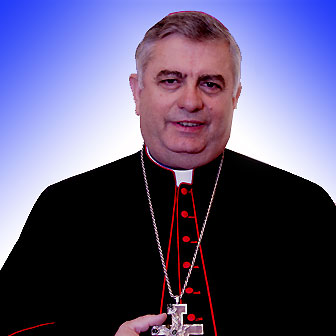
- Archdiocese: Mérida-Badajoz
- Appointed: 14 August 2023 (coadjutor)
- In office: 29 June 2024
- Predecessor: Celso Morga Iruzubieta
- Previous posts: General Minister of the Order of Friars Minor (2003–2013); Secretary of the Dicastery for Institutes of Consecrated Life and Societies of Apostolic Life (2013–2023)

Orders
- Ordination: 28 June 1977
- Consecration: 18 May 2013 by Tarcisio Bertone

Personal details
- Born: 11 August 1953 (age 72) Lodoselo (Sarreaus), Spain
- Denomination: Catholic
- Motto: Scio cui enim credidi ("I know whom I have believed")
- Coat of arms

José Rodríguez Carballo OFM (born 11 August 1953) is a Spanish prelate of the Catholic Church who became Archbishop of Mérida-Badajoz in June 2024 after a year as coadjutor there. He was secretary of the Dicastery for Institutes of Consecrated Life and Societies of Apostolic Life from 2013 to 2023 and minister general of the Order of Friars Minor from 2003 to 2013.

== Biography ==
José Rodríguez Carballo was born on 11 August 1953 in Lodoselo (Sarreaus), Spain. He entered the Minor Seminary of the Franciscan Province of Santiago de Compostela in Zamora in 1964. The next year he studied at the seminary Herbón in La Coruña. He finished his studies and undertook his novitiate year at the Convent of Ponteareas. He took his temporary vows on 9 August 1971.

He spent the next two academic years at the Center for Theological Studies in Compostela and then continued his studies in Jerusalem from 1973 to 1976, completing his licentiate in theology on 23 June 1976. He took his solemn vows on 8 December 1976 in the Basilica of the Annunciation in Nazareth.

He was ordained a priest on 28 June 1977 at the Church of Saint Savior in Jerusalem. (Note: By one account he was ordained by Pope Paul VI, who only visited Jerusalem in 1964.)

Beginning in 1976 he attended the Studium Biblicum Franciscanum in Jerusalem, earning a degree in biblical theology in 1978. He then enrolled at the Pontifical Biblical Institute and obtained a degree in sacred scripture in 1982.

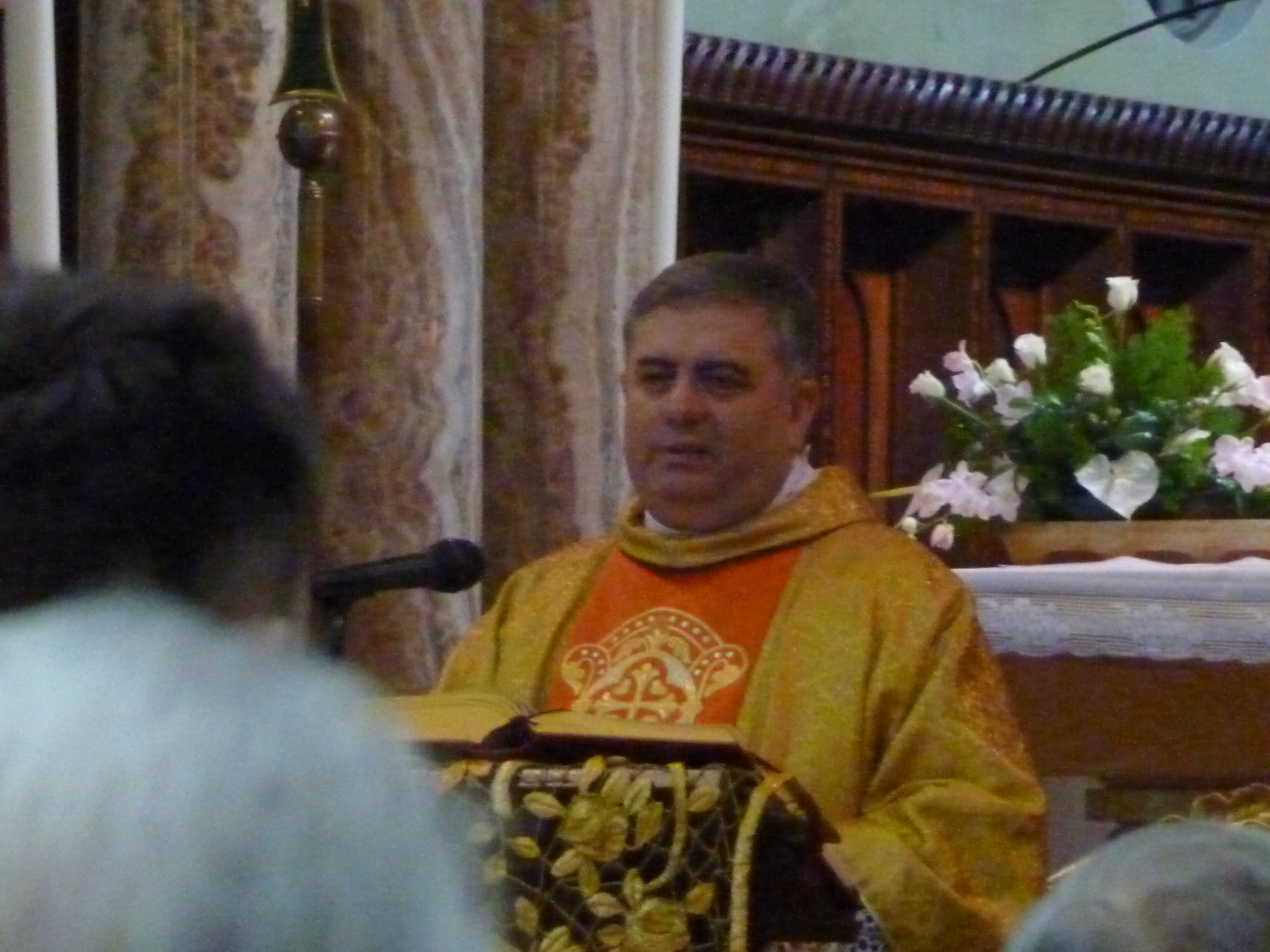
Carballo in 2011

He returned to Spain and was master first of postulants and then of novices from 1982 to 1989. In 1989 he became Rector of the Guardian and Convent of St. Francis in Santiago de Compostela and Master of the Friars of temporary profession. He was a professor of Sacred Scripture at the Diocesan Seminary of Vigo from 1982 to 1992, and at the Center for Theological Studies of Santiago de Compostela from 1985 to 1992 he taught the theology of consecrated life.

He was elected provincial minister of the Franciscan Province of Santiago de Compostela in 1992.

From 1993 to 1997 he was president of the Union of Franciscan Provincial Ministers of Europe.

On 5 June 2003 he was elected minister general of the Order of Friars Minor, the 119th successor of St. Francis of Assisi. He was elected to another six-year term on 4 June 2009.

Pope John Paul II named him a member of the Congregation for the Evangelization of Peoples on 7 August 2004 and of the Congregation for Institutes of Consecrated Life and Societies of Apostolic Life on 11 December 2004.

On 23 November 2012, he was elected to a three-year term as president of the Union of Superiors General.

On 6 April 2013, Pope Francis appointed him titular archbishop of Belcastro and secretary of the Congregation for Institutes of Consecrated Life and Societies of Apostolic Life, a position that had been vacant for several months. It was Francis' first appointment to a post in the Roman Curia. He received his episcopal consecration on 18 May in the cathedral of Santiago da Compostela from Cardinal Tarcisio Bertone.

On 14 September 2023, Pope Francis named him archbishop coadjutor of Mérida-Badajoz in Spain, noting that Rodríguez would continue his Vatican duties until the end of October. He was installed there on 25 November 2023.

He succeeded as Archbishop of Mérida-Badajoz on 29 June 2024.

He is a member of the International Academy of Portuguese Culture.

== Notes ==
Catholic Church titles
Preceded by Giacomo Bini	Minister General of the Order of Friars Minor; 2003–2013	Succeeded by Michael A. Perry
Preceded by Joseph William Tobin	Secretary of the Congregation for Institutes of Consecrated Life and Societies of Apostolic Life; 2013–2023	Succeeded by Simona Brambilla
Preceded by Julien Ries	Titular bishop of Belcastro; 2013–2023	Succeeded by Giovanni Cesare Pagazzi
Preceded by Celso Morga Iruzubieta	Archbishop of Mérida-Badajoz; 2024– Coadjutor 2023–2024	Incumbent
