= Bertrand de La Tour =

French Franciscan theologian and cardinal

Bertrand de La Tour OFM
- Cardinal-Bishop of Frascati
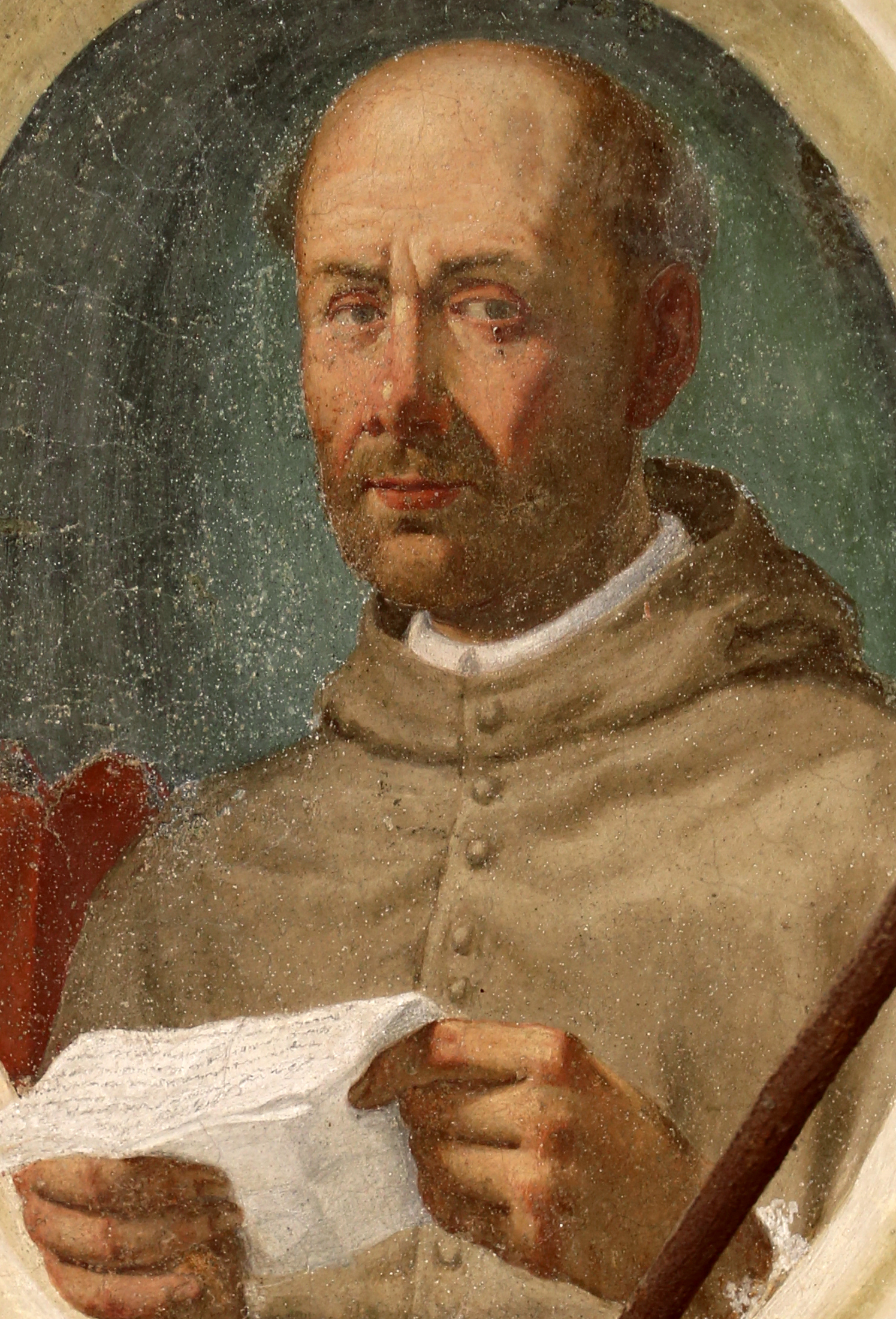
- Fresco by the workshop of Fabrizio Boschi in Ognissanti, Florence
- Church: Catholic Church
- Diocese: Suburbicarian Diocese of Frascati
- In office: June 1323 – 1333
- Predecessor: Berengar Fredol the Elder
- Successor: Annibaldo Caetani
- Previous posts: Cardinal-Priest of San Vitale (1320-1323); Archbishop of Salerno (1320-1321)

Orders
- Consecration: 21 October 1320 by Berengar Fredol the Younger
- Created cardinal: 20 December 1320 by Pope John XXII

Personal details
- Born: 1265 Camboulit, Quercy, Kingdom of France
- Died: 1333 (aged 67–68) Avignon, Comtat Venaissin, Papal States

Bertrand de La Tour (1265? – 1332 or 1333), also known as Bertrand de Turre, was a French Franciscan theologian and cardinal.

Bertrand was born in Camboulit in the old province of Quercy, France. Serving as a provincial minister in Aquitaine from 1312 onwards he became a leading opponent of the Franciscan Spirituals. He undertook diplomatic missions for Pope John XXII with Bernard Gui from 1317–1318. After this time, he was asked to aid in evaluating the heresy of Peter Olivi. Bertrand was made Archbishop of Salerno and then Cardinal of San Vitale in 1320. In 1323 Bertrand was appointed cardinal bishop of Tusculum.

After the deposition of Michael of Cesena in 1328, on John XXII's behest Bertrand acted as vicar general of the Franciscan Order.

He was nicknamed "Doctor famosus".

== Bibliography ==
- Patrick Nold, Bertrand de la Tour O.Min.: Life and Works, Archivum Franciscanum Historicum, 94 (2001), 275–323.
- Patrick Nold, Bertrand de la Tour O.Min.: Manuscript list and sermon supplement, Archivum Franciscanum Historicum, 95 (2002), 351.
- Patrick Nold, Pope John XXII and his Franciscan Cardinal: Bertrand de la Tour and the Apostolic Poverty Controversy (Oxford, 2003).

Catholic Church titles
Preceded by Michael of Cesena	Vicar general of the Order of Friars Minor; 1329–1329	Succeeded by Gerardus Odonis
