= Gonsalvus of Spain =

Spanish Franciscan theologian and scholastic philosopher (c. 1255 – 1313)

Gonsalvus Hispanus (Spanish: Gonzalo de España; c. 1255 – 1313) was a Spanish Franciscan theologian and scholastic philosopher, who became Minister General of the Order of Friars Minor.

He was born at Lugo. He taught at the University of Paris, where he carried out a disputation with Meister Eckhart in 1303. He was expelled from Paris as a papal supporter, in the dispute with Philip IV of France. He came across the younger Duns Scotus and supported him, appointing him regent master of the Franciscans there in 1304.

== Dispute with Meister Eckhart ==
The origin of Gonsalvus's dispute with Eckhart has to do with the relative superiority of the will to that of the intellect in knowing God. Gonsalvus held that the will was superior since, through it, God is known as he actually is whereas the intellect only knows the image of God in the mind. Eckhart believed that the intellect was superior to the will in this regard since through it, God can be known without any of the human qualities with which the will invests its image of him.

== Notes ==
Catholic Church titles
Preceded by Giovanni Mincio da Morrovalle	Minister General of the Order of Friars Minor; 1304–1313	Succeeded by Alexander Bonini
