= Guillaume Farinier =

French Franciscan

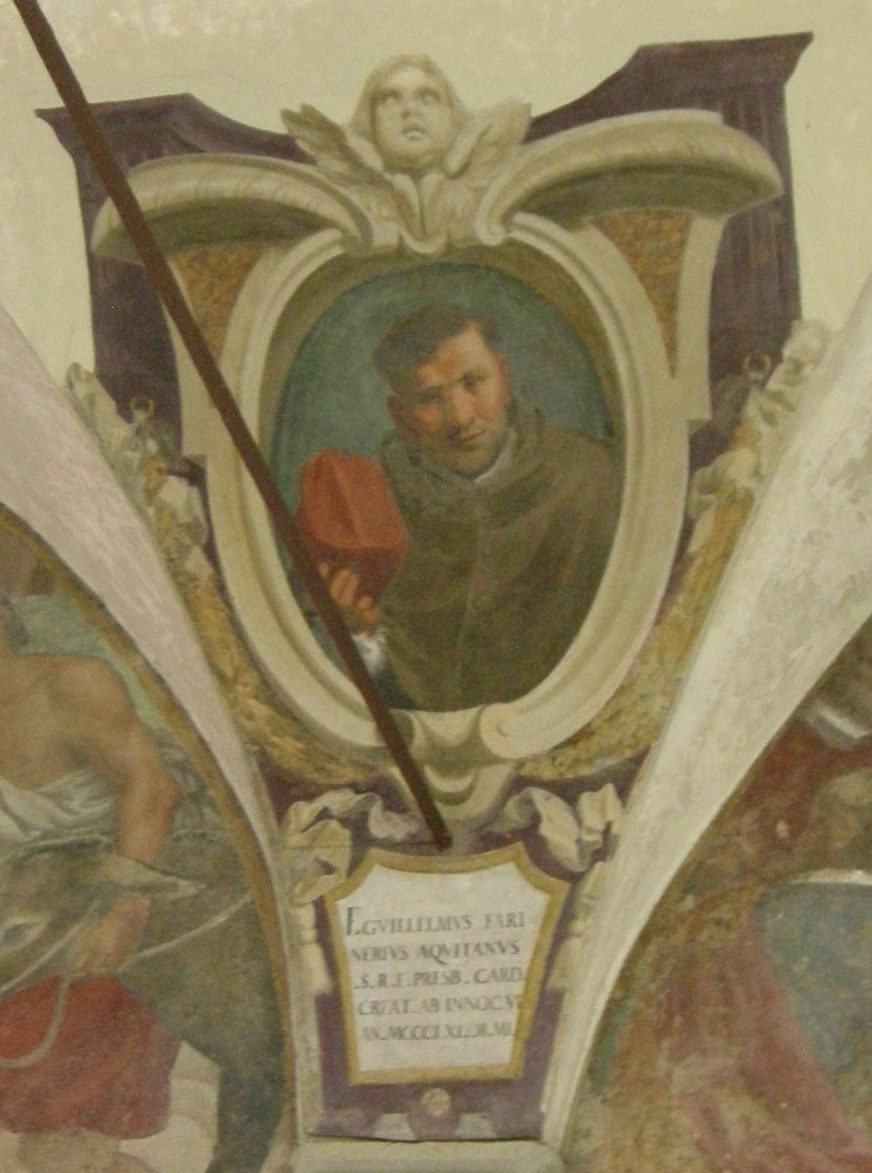
Guillaume Farinier

Guillaume Farinier (died 1361) was a French Franciscan from Aquitaine. He became Minister General of the Order of Friars Minor in 1348.

He taught theology at the University of Toulouse. He was made Cardinal in 1356.

== Notes ==
Catholic Church titles
Preceded by Fortanerius Vassalli	Minister General of the Order of Friars Minor; 1348–1357	Succeeded by Jean de Buc
Preceded by Jean de Buc	Vicar General of the Order of Friars Minor; 1358–1359	Succeeded by Marcus of Viterbo
