= Guillermo Robazoglio =

Italian Franciscan

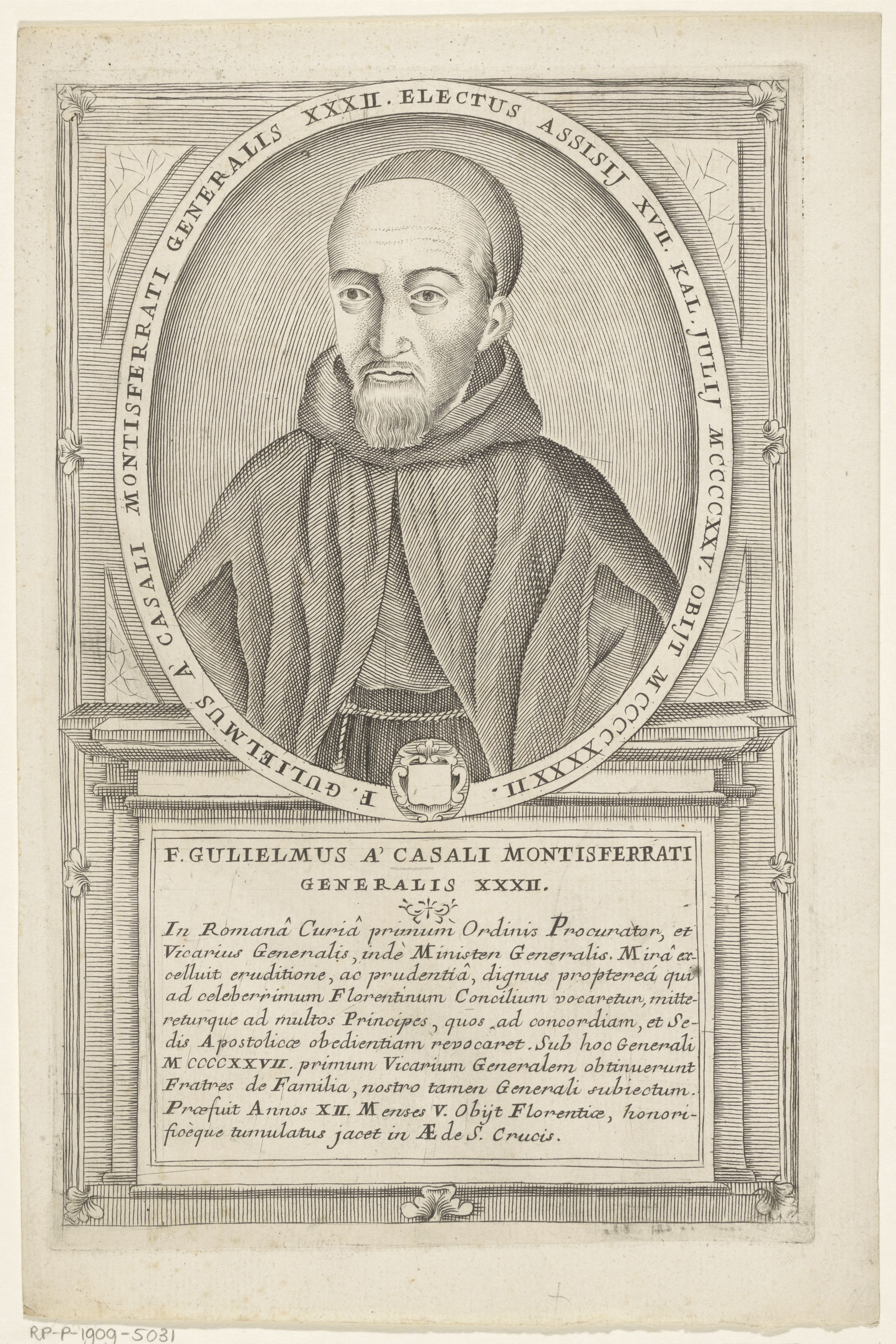
Engraved portrait of Guillermo Robazoglio da Casale by Antonio Luciani (early 18th century)

Guillermo Robazoglio da Casale (died 1442) was an Italian Franciscan who became the 32nd Minister General of his order. In that capacity, he took part in the Council of Florence.

== Biography ==
He embraced religious life among the Franciscans of the province of Genoa and studied theology at the University of Padua.

He was the attorney general of his order and from 1427 he also held the office of inquisitor.

He was esteemed by Pope Martin V and, to eliminate the elements of contrast between the Conventual and Observant currents within the Franciscan order, the pontiff appointed him as vicar alongside Antonio da Massa Marittima, the order's general minister: in the chapter celebrated in 1430 in Assisi, Antonio was deposed and Guglielmo was elected general minister in his place.

For the reform of the order he availed himself of the help of Giovanni da Capestrano, Matteo Guimerà and Giacomo della Marca; he appointed Bernardino da Siena as vicar general of the Observants.

After the election of the antipope Felix V, he was sent as papal legate to Charles VIII of France to bring him back to the obedience of Pope Eugene IV.
