= Alexander Bonini =

Italian theologian (c. 1270–1314)

Alexander Bonini (c. 1270 – 1314) was an Italian Franciscan philosopher, who became Minister General of the Order of Friars Minor.

He taught at the University of Paris. A prolific writer, he is now remembered most for his Tractatus de Usuris. It is especially notable for its subtle treatment of the pricing of contracts involving risks; for example it writes of life annuities, 'we see men and women twenty-five years old buying life annuities for a price such that within eight years they will receive their stake back; and although they may live less than those eight years, it is more probable (probabilius) that they will live twice that. Thus the buyer has in his favour what happens more frequently and is more probable.'

== Bibliography ==
- Alexander Bonini, Un traité de morale economique au XIVe siecle: Le tractatus de usuris de maitre Alexandre d'Alexandrie (1962) editor A.-M. Hamelin
- Alexandri de Alexandria, In Duodecim Aristotelis Metaphysicae Expositio Venice 1592.

Catholic Church titles
Preceded by Gonsalvus of Spain	Minister General of the Order of Friars Minor; 1313–1314	Succeeded by Michael of Cesena
