= Fortanerius Vassalli =

Italian Franciscan

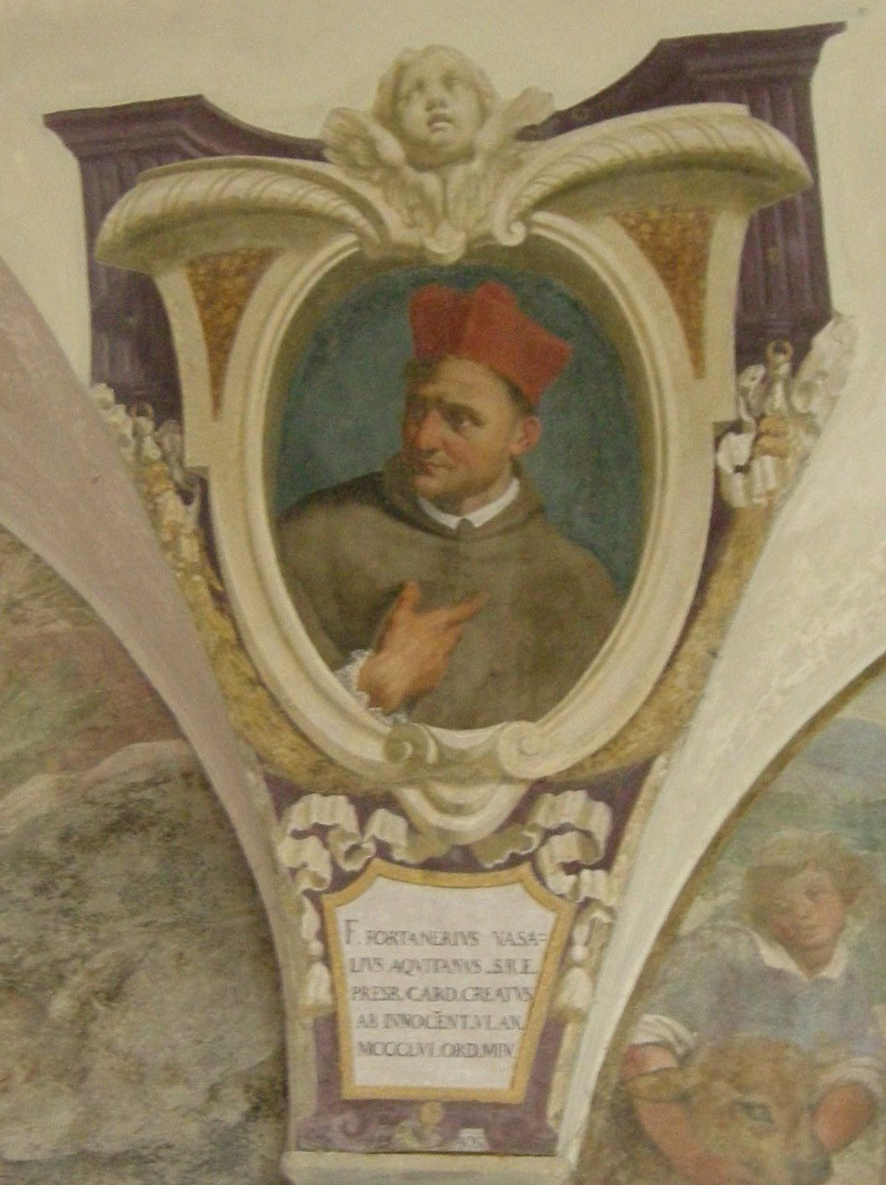
Painting of Fortanerius Vassalli in the Ognissanti, Florence

Fortanerius Vassalli (died October 1361) was an Italian Franciscan priest who became Minister General of the Order of Friars Minor, and a cardinal a few weeks before he died on the way to Avignon.

He held a wide variety of ecclesiastical posts. He was Patriarch of Grado. He took part in the crusade against the Ordelaffi and Manfredi. He was Archbishop of Ravenna (1348 in one source, stepping down as minister general, but in other sources 1342–7) and Patriarch of Venice. He was also appointed Archdeacon of London late in 1361, and Prebendary of St. Paul's.

== Notes ==
Catholic Church titles
| Preceded by Gerardus Odonis | Minister General of the Order of Friars Minor; 1342–1348 | Succeeded by Guillaume Farinier |
