= Matthew of Aquasparta =

Italian Friar Minor and philosopher

Matthew of Aquasparta OFM
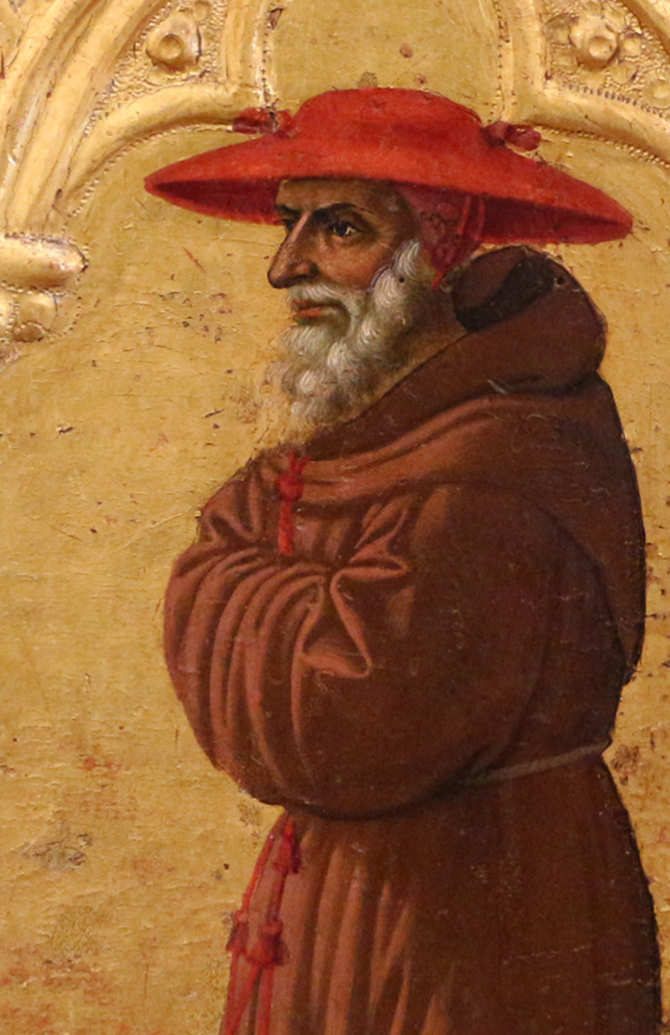
- Portrait of Matthew of Aquasparta; particular from the Gualdo Tadino Polyptych by Niccolò Alunno
- Born: c. 1240; Acquasparta, Papal States
- Died: 29 October 1302 (aged 61–62); Rome, Papal States
- Resting place: Santa Maria in Ara Coeli

Education
- Education: University of Paris

Philosophical work
- Era: Medieval philosophy
- Region: Western philosophy
- School: Scholasticism; Augustinianism
- Main interests: Metaphysics, logic, ontology, political philosophy

Matthew of Aquasparta (Italian: Matteo di Aquasparta; c. 1240 – 29 October 1302) was an Italian Friar Minor and scholastic philosopher. He was elected Minister General of the Order.

== Life ==
Born in Acquasparta, Umbria, he was a member of the Bentivenghi family, to which belonged his fellow Franciscan, Cardinal Bentivenga dei Bentivenghi, bishop of Albano (died 1290). Matthew entered the Franciscan Order at Todi, took the degree of Master of Theology at Paris, and taught also for a time at Bologna.

Friar John Peckham having become Archbishop of Canterbury in 1279, Matteo was in 1280 made Peckham's successor as Lector sacri Palatii apostolici, i.e. he was appointed reader (teacher) of theology to the papal Curia. In 1287 the General Chapter of the Order held at Montpellier elected him Minister General in succession to Arlotto of Prato.

When Girolamo Masci of Ascoli, who had previously been Minister General of the Franciscan Order, became pope as Nicholas IV, 15 February 1288, he created Matthew cardinal with the titulus of San Lorenzo in Damaso that May. After this Matteo was made Cardinal Bishop of Porto, and penitentiarius major (Grand Penitentiary). He still, however, retained the direction of the Order until the chapter of 1289. Matthew had summoned this chapter to meet at Assisi, but Nicholas IV caused it to be held in his presence at Rieti; here Raymond Gaufredi, a native of Provence, was elected Minister General.

As Minister General of the Order, Matthew maintained a moderate, middle course; among other things he reorganized the studies pursued in the order. In the quarrel between Pope Boniface VIII and the Colonna family, from 1297 onwards, he strongly supported the pope, both in official memorials and in public sermons. Pope Boniface appointed him, both in 1297 and 1300, to important embassies to Lombardy, the Romagna, and to Guelph Florence, where the Neri and Bianchi Guelph factions were violently at issue with each other.

In 1301 Matthew returned to Florence, following Charles of Valois, but neither peace nor reconciliation was brought about. The Blacks finally obtained the upper hand, and the chief Whites were obliged to go into exile; among these was the poet Dante. In a famous passage of the Divina Commedia (Paradiso, XII, 124–26), Dante certainly speaks as a partisan of the Bianchi against Matthew of Aquasparta, calling Cardinal Matthew a sodomite. Matthew, however, had died before this, on 28 October 1302. He was buried in Rome, in the Franciscan church of Santa Maria in Aracoeli, where his monument is still to be seen.

== Writings ==
Matteo was a learned philosopher and theologian and probably a personal pupil of St. Bonaventure, whose teaching, in general, he followed, or rather developed. In this respect he was one of what is known as the older Franciscan school, who preferred Augustinianism to the more pronounced Aristotelianism of Thomas Aquinas.

His principal work is the acute Quæstiones disputatæ, which treats of various subjects. Of this one book appeared at Quaracchi in 1903, namely: "Quæstiones disputatæ selectæ", in "Bibliotheca Franciscana scholastica medii ævi", I; the "Quæstiones" are preceded by a "Tractatus de excellentia S. Scripturæ" (pp. 1–22), also by a "Sermo de studio S. Scripturæ" (pp. 22–36); it is followed by "De processione Spiritus Sancti" (pp. 429–53). Five "Quæstiones de Cognitione" had already been edited in the collection called "De humanæ cognitionis ratione anecdota quædam" (Quaracchi, 1883), 87–182.

The rest of his works, still unedited, are to be found at Assisi and Todi. Among them are: "Commentarius in 4 libros Sententiarum" (autograph); "Concordantiæ super 4 ll. Sententiarum"; "Postilla super librum Job"; "Postilla super Psalterium" (autograph); "In 12 Prophetas Minores"; "In Danielem"; "In Ev. Matthæi"; "In Apocalypsim" (autograph); "In Epist. ad Romanos"; "Sermones dominicales et feriales" (autograph).

== Bibliography ==
- The editions referred to the Quæstiones disputatæ (1903), pp. v-xvi, and De Hum. Cognit., pp. xiv-xv
- Chronica XXIV Ministr. General O. Min. in Analecta Franciscana, III (Quaracchi, 1897), 406–19, 699, 703
- Luke Wadding, Scriptores Ord. Min. (Rome, 1650), 252, (1806), 172, (1906), 269–70
- Sbaralea, Suppl. ad Script. O. M. (Rome, 1806), 525
- Henry Denifle and Émile Chatelain, Chartular. Univ. Paris., II (Paris, 1891), 59
- Ehrle in Zeitschrift für katholische Theologie, VII (Innsbruck, 1883), 46
- Martin Grabmann, Die philosophische und theologische Erkenntnislehre des Kardinals Matthäus von Aquasparta (Vienna, 1906)
- Theologische Studien der Leo Gesellschaft, Pt. XIV.

Catholic Church titles
Preceded by Arlotto da Prato	Minister General of the Order of Friars Minor; 1287–1289	Succeeded by Raymond de Gaufredi
