= Nicolas Papini =

Italian monk and historian

Nicolas Papini (c. 1751 – 16 December 1834) was an Italian monk and historian.

== Life ==
Having entered the Order of the Conventuals he taught Italian literature at Modena, was secretary of the Provincial of Tuscany, custos of the Sacred Convent of Assisi, 1800(?)-1803, a short time guardian of Dodici Apostoli at Rome, and finally named Minister General of the Conventuals 1803-09. Later on he lived at Assisi and Terni, where he is buried.

== Works ==
His printed works are:

- L'Etruria Francescana o vero raccolta di notizie storiche interessanti l'Ordine de FF. Minori Conventuali di S. Francesco in Toscana, I, Siena, 1797
- Notizie sicure della monte, sepoltura, canonizzazione e traslazione di S. Francesco d'Assisi e del ritrovamento del di lui corpo, 2nd ed., Foligno, 1824
- Storia del Perdono d'Assisi con documenti e osservazioni, Florence, 1824
- La Storia di S. Francesco di Assisi, opera critica, 2 vols., Foligno, 1827
