= Massimo Fusarelli =

Italian Franciscan friar (born 1963)

The Very Reverend Massimo Fusarelli O.F.M.
- Minister General of the Order of Friars Minor
- Predecessor: Michael Anthony Perry, O.F.M.
- Other posts: Provincial minister of Lazio and Abruzzo (2020)

Orders
- Ordination: 30 September 1989

Personal details
- Born: 30 March 1963 (age 63) Roma, Lazio, Italy

Massimo Fusarelli, OFM (born 30 March 1963) is an Italian Franciscan friar who has served as the minister general of the Order of Friars Minor since 2021.

== Biography ==
Fusarelli was born on 30 March 1963, in Rome, where he grew up with his family.

The meeting with the Friars Minor took place in the parish of San Francesco di Tivoli. He entered the order, took the habit on 28 July 1982, made his first religious profession on 30 July 1983, his final one on 8 January 1989, and received priestly ordination on 30 September 1989.

After graduating in theology at the Pontifical Athenaeum Antonianum in 1988, he continued his studies in patristics at the Augustinianum Patristic Institute until graduating in 1992. From 1991 to 1996 he was Professor of Patristic Theology at the Institute of Religious Sciences of the Pontifical Athenaeum Antonianum.

Over the years Fusarelli has developed numerous activities in the life of the order and in the pastoral ministry. From 2009 to 2013 he served in the small Franciscan community in the Torre Angela district of Rome, also collaborating with the parish of Santi Simone and Giuda Taddeo in Torre Angela. Along with other brothers, he assisted the victims of the Amatrice and Accumoli earthquake from October 2016 to August 2017. Since September 2017 he has been a tutor and parish priest at San Francesco a Ripa in Rome, where he was responsible for the project for the reception of people in need. . "Ripa dei Settesoli". Since 2 July 2020, he has been the Provincial Minister of Lazio and Abruzzo.

Fusarelli was elected minister general of the Order of Friars Minor on 13 July 2021. After his election, Fusarelli was congratulated by Pope Francis in a letter delivered to him.
