= Arlotto of Prato =

Franciscan and Italian theologian

Arlotto of Prato (died 1286) was an Italian Franciscan theologian. He became Minister General of the Order of Friars Minor at the end of his life.

Arlotto is known also for the Quaestio de Aeternitate Mundi, and as a Biblical scholar. He compiled a Bible concordance, of the Latin Vulgate. This is sometimes cited as the first such. It was in fact based on an earlier thirteenth century work of Hugh of St. Cher. The Jewish Encyclopedia states that Arlotto's work was then used as a model for a Hebrew Bible concordance, by Isaac Nathan ben Kalonymus.

== Notes ==
Catholic Church titles
Preceded by Bonagratia de San Giovanni in Persiceto	Minister General of the Order of Friars Minor; 1285–1286	Succeeded by Matthew of Aquasparta
