= Marcus of Viterbo =

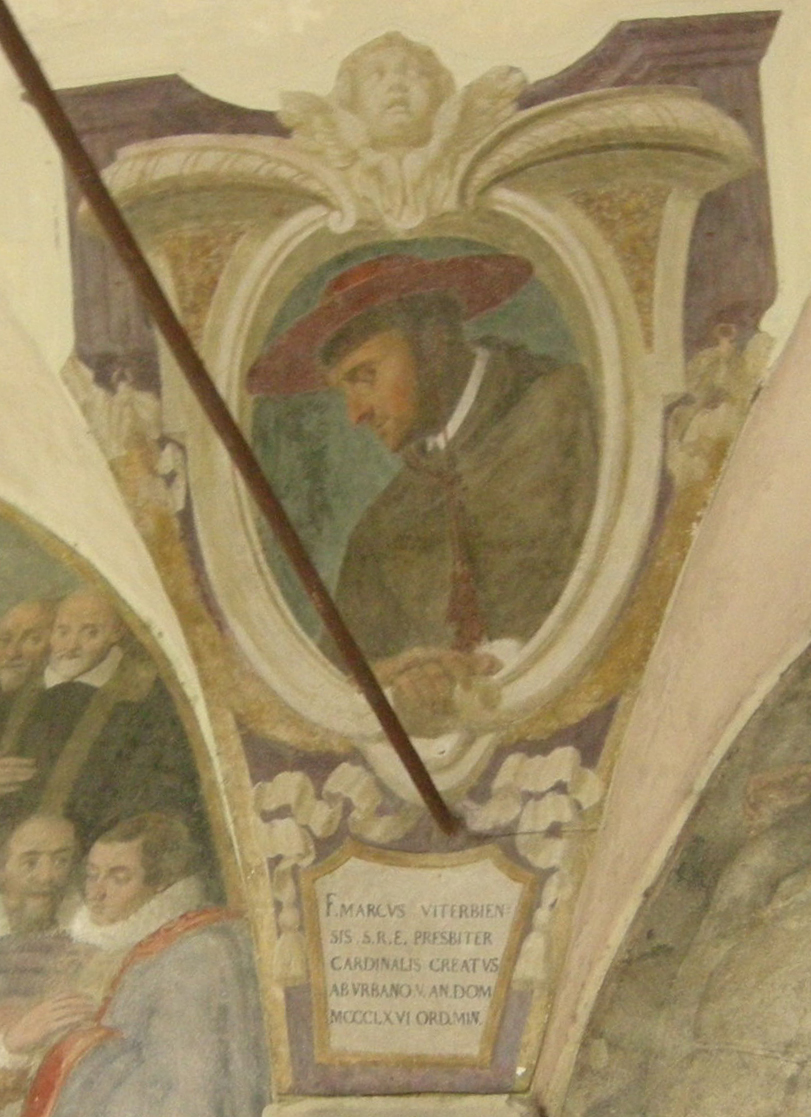
- Marco da Viterbo
- Born: 1304
- Died: 1369 (aged 64–65)
- Occupation: Franciscan
- Known for: Minister General of his order, papal legate, Cardinal

Marcus of Viterbo (1304–1369) was an Italian Franciscan. He became Minister General of his order in 1359, a papal legate, and in 1366 a Cardinal.

He died of plague. A monument to him is in the Chiesa di S. Francesco in Viterbo.

== Notes ==
Catholic Church titles
| Preceded by Guillaume Farinier | Minister General of the Order of Friars Minor; 1359–1366 | Succeeded by Thomas of Frignano |
