= Bonagratia de San Giovanni in Persiceto =

Italian Friar Minor

Bonagratia de San Giovanni in Persiceto (fl. 1278–1283) was an Italian Friar Minor, who became Minister General of the Order.

In the 1270s he led a papal mission to Michael VIII Palaiologos.

== Historical context ==
Pope John XXI employed Jerome of Ascoli, Minister General of the Franciscans, and John of Vercelli, Master of the Dominicans, as mediators in the war between Philip III of France and Alfonso X of Castile. This embassy occupied both Superiors till March, 1279, although Jerome was preferred to the cardinalate on 12 March 1278. When Jerome departed on the embassy to the Greeks, he had appointed Bonagratia to represent him at the General Chapter of Padua in 1276. On 20 May 1279, he convened the General Chapter of Assisi, at which Bonagratia was elected Minister General.

Bonagratia conducted a deputation from the chapter before Pope Nicholas III, who was then staying at Soriano, and petitioned for a cardinal-protector. The Pope, who had himself been protector, appointed his nephew Matteo Orsini. He also asked for a definition of the rule of the Order, which the pope, after personal consultation with cardinals and the theologians of the order, issued in the Exiit qui seminat of 14 August 1279. In this the order's complete renunciation of property in communi was again confirmed, and all property given to the brothers was vested in the Holy See, unless the donor wished to retain his title. All moneys were to be held in trust by the nuntii, or spiritual friends, for the friars, who could however raise no claim to them. The purchase of goods could take place only through procurators appointed by the pope, or by the cardinal-protector in his name.

The Bull of Pope Martin IV Ad fructus uberes (13 December 1281) defined the relations of the mendicants to the secular clergy. The mendicant orders had long been exempt from the jurisdiction of the bishop, and enjoyed (as distinguished from the secular clergy) unrestricted freedom to preach and hear confessions in the churches connected with their monasteries. This had led to endless friction and open quarrels between the two divisions of the clergy, and, although Martin IV granted no new privileges to the mendicants, the strife now broke out with increased violence, chiefly in France and in a particular manner at Paris.

In the Bull Exultantes of 18 January 1283, Martin IV instituted the syndici Apostolici. This was the name given to the men appointed by the ministers and custodians to receive in the name of the Holy See the alms given to the Franciscans, and to pay it out again at their request. The syndici consequently replaced the nuntii and procurators. All these regulations were necessary in consequence of the rule of poverty, the literal and unconditional observance of which was rendered impossible by the great expansion of the Order, by its pursuit of learning, and the accumulated property of the large cloisters in the towns. The appointment of these trustees, however, was neither subversive of nor an evasion of the rule, but rather the proper observance of its precepts under the altered conditions of the time.

Under Bonagratia, and his immediate successors, the Spiritual movement broke out in the Province of Ancona, under the leadership of Pietro da Macerata.

== Notes ==
Catholic Church titles
Preceded by Jerome of Ascoli	Minister General of the Order of Friars Minor; 1278–1283	Succeeded by Arlotto of Prato
