= Giovanni Mincio da Morrovalle =

Italian Franciscan

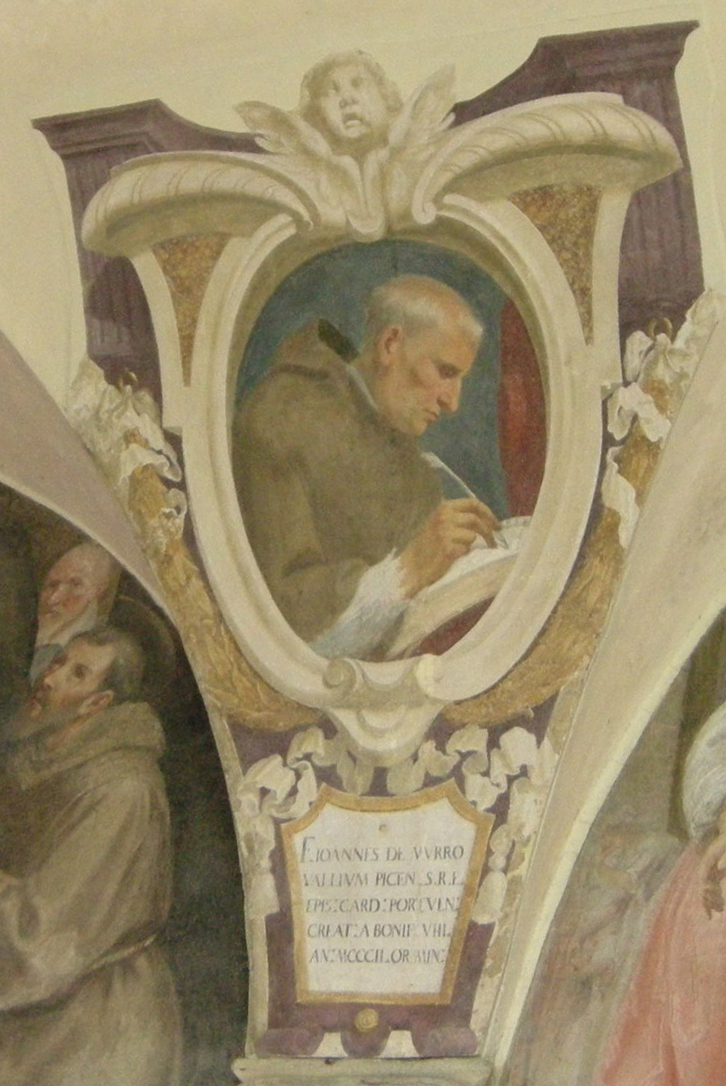
Giovanni Mincio da Morrovalle

Giovanni Mincio may also refer to antipope Benedict X

Giovanni Minio or Mincio, of Morrovalle or Murrovale (died August 1312) was an Italian Franciscan who became Minister General of the Order of Friars Minor, cardinal-bishop of Porto (1302), Protector of the Order of Friars Minors (1307) and dean of the Sacred College of Cardinals (1311).

According to Giorgio Vasari, it was Mincio who commissioned Giotto for his frescoes of Francis of Assisi.

== Notes ==
Catholic Church titles
Preceded by Raymond de Gaufredi	Minister General of the Order of Friars Minor; 1296–1304	Succeeded by Gonsalvus Hispanus
