= Michael Perry (Franciscan) =

American friar (born 1954)

The Very Reverend Michael A. Perry O.F.M.
- Minister General Emeritus of the Order of Friars Minor
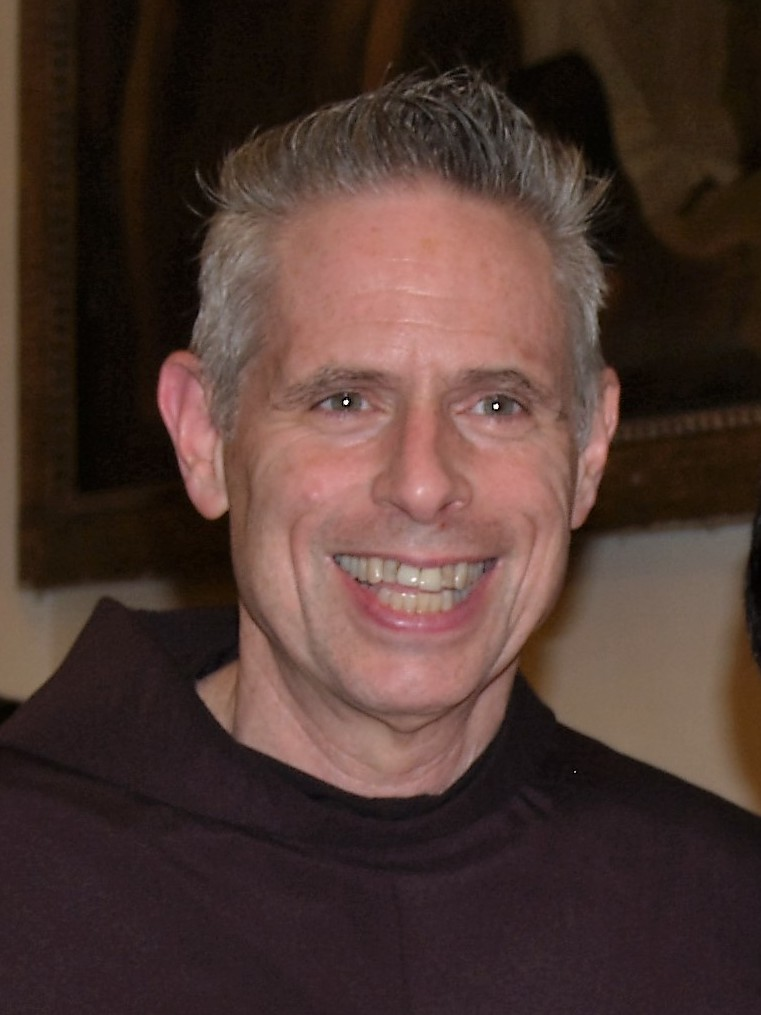
- Perry in 2016
- Elected: 22 May 2013
- Term ended: July 2021
- Predecessor: José Rodríguez Carballo, O.F.M.
- Successor: Massimo Fusarelli, O.F.M.
- Other posts: Vicar General of the Order of Friars Minor (2009–2013); Minister Provincial of the Province of the Sacred Heart (2008–2009)

Orders
- Ordination: 2 June 1984

Personal details
- Born: 7 June 1954 (age 72) Indianapolis, Indiana, United States

Michael Anthony Perry, O.F.M. (born 1954), is an American Franciscan friar who served as the minister general of the Order of Friars Minor from 2013 to 2021.

== Biography ==
Perry was born in Indianapolis, Indiana, in the United States. He is a 1972 graduate of Roncalli High School (Indiana). He earned a Bachelor of Arts degree in History and Philosophy from Quincy University. Following his university studies, he entered the novitiate of the Province of the Sacred Heart of the Franciscan Order on 25 June 1977, and professed temporary religious vows on 11 August of the following year, the feast day of Saint Clare of Assisi.

Perry was then sent to pursue his academic studies in preparation for ordination as a Catholic priest. He earned the degree of Master of Arts in Theology, and then a Masters of Divinity from Catholic Theological Union in Chicago, IL. He professed solemn vows as a full member of the Franciscan friars on 10 October 1981, and was ordained on 2 June 1984.

After his ordination, Perry was assigned to serve his province in the formation of its candidates, during which time he worked with the Office of Justice, Peace and Integrity of Creation, an international ministry of the Franciscans. For ten years he worked as a missionary in the Democratic Republic of Congo. During that period, he gained a doctorate in religious anthropology. He worked in Africa until his election as a provincial minister in 2008.

After his return to the United States, Perry served as a resource for Catholic Relief Services and the United States Conference of Catholic Bishops. His return to his native country lasted only a year, however, as the following year he was elected to serve as the Franciscans' vicar general.

Perry was elected general minister of the order on 22 May 2013, to complete the six-year term of his predecessor, José Rodríguez Carballo, O.F.M., after Rodríguez was named a bishop and the new secretary for the Congregation for Institutes of Consecrated Life and Societies of Apostolic Life, a part of the Roman Curia.

His successor, Massimo Fusarelli, was elected in July 2021.
