= Camboulit =

- Commune
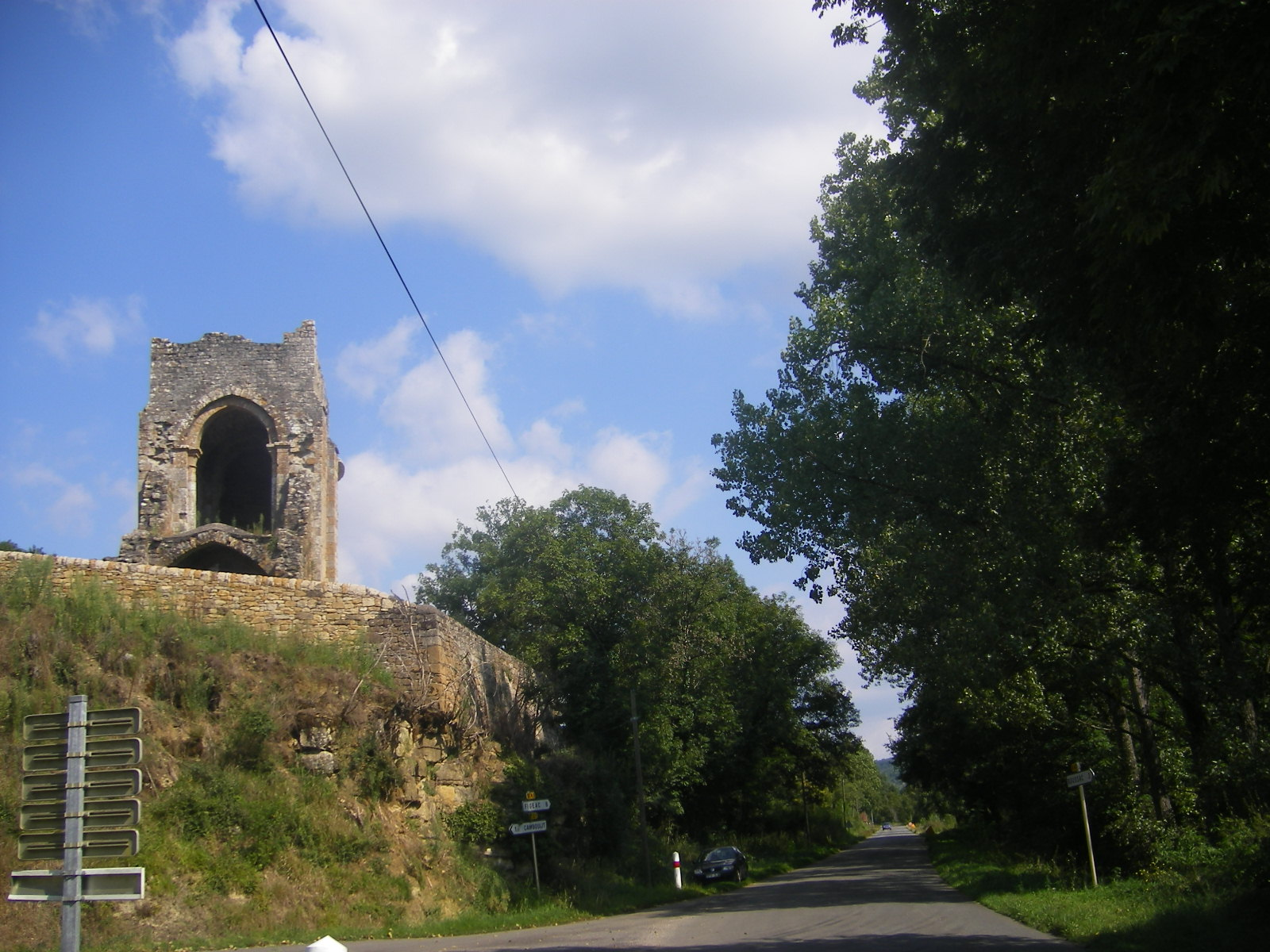
- The ruins of the Chapelle St Martin in Camboulit

- Coat of arms
- Location of Camboulit
- Location within France Location within Occitanie
- Coordinates: 44°36′03″N 1°57′02″E
- Country: France
- Region: Occitania
- Department: Lot
- Arrondissement: Figeac
- Canton: Figeac-1
- Intercommunality: CC Grand-Figeac

Government
  - Mayor (2020–2026): Jean-Claude Voynet
- Area^{1}: 5.19 km^{2} (2.00 sq mi)
- Elevation: 232 m (761 ft)
- Highest elevation: 312 m (1,024 ft)
- Lowest elevation: 177 m (581 ft)
- Population (2023): 245
  - Density: 47.2/km^{2} (122/sq mi)
- Time zone: UTC+01:00 (CET)
  - Summer (DST): UTC+02:00 (CEST)
- INSEE/Postal code: 46052 /46100
- ^{1} French Land Register data, which excludes lakes, ponds, glaciers > 1 km^{2} (0.386 sq mi or 247 acres) and river estuaries.

Camboulit (French pronunciation: [kɑ̃buli]; Occitan: Cambolit) is a commune in the Lot department in south-western France.

== See also ==
- Communes of the Lot department
