= Penitenziagite =

Medieval slogan meaning "Do penance"

Penitenziagite ("Do penance") is a rallying cry derived from the Latin "poenitentiam agite," meaning the same. It has been also interpreted as a paraphrase of the Greek "πένητες διάγετε" ("penites diagete") attributed to Christ, meaning "live life as a pauper."

The phrase was used by the Dulcinian movement founded by Gerard Segarelli (1240–1300) in the 13th century, a movement named after the disciple Fra Dolcino.

The phrase is used in the novel The Name of the Rose by Umberto Eco and in the Jean-Jacques Annaud movie and also a miniseries of same name. It is also used by Guillermo del Toro as Pappy McPoyle in season 8, episode 3 of It's Always Sunny in Philadelphia, "The Maureen Ponderosa Wedding Massacre".

A sample of Ron Perlman's character from the 1986 movie The Name of the Rose saying the word appears in the song "Endemoniada," the first track on the album The Nephilim, by the band Fields of the Nephilim.

== See also ==
- Poenitentiam agite
