= The Name of the Rose (film) =

1986 film

- US release poster by Drew Struzan
- Directed by: Jean-Jacques Annaud
- Screenplay by: Andrew Birkin; Gérard Brach; Howard Franklin; Alain Godard
- Based on: The Name of the Rose by Umberto Eco
- Produced by: Bernd Eichinger; Bernd Schaefers
- Starring: Sean Connery; F. Murray Abraham; Feodor Chaliapin Jr.; William Hickey; Michael Lonsdale; Ron Perlman; Christian Slater; Valentina Vargas
- Narrated by: Dwight Weist
- Cinematography: Tonino Delli Colli
- Edited by: Jane Seitz
- Music by: James Horner
- Production companies: ZDF; FR3 Films Production; RAI; Neue Constantin Film; Les Films Ariane; Acteurs Auteurs Associés; Cristaldi Film; Nelson Entertainment
- Distributed by: 20th Century Fox (United States and Canada); Columbia Pictures (Italy); Neue Constantin Film (West Germany); Acteurs Auteurs Associés (France)
- Release dates: 19 September 1986 (United States); 16 October 1986 (West Germany); 17 October 1986 (Italy); 17 December 1986 (France)
- Running time: 131 minutes
- Countries: Italy; West Germany; France
- Language: English
- Budget: $17.5 million
- Box office: $77.2 million

The Name of the Rose is a 1986 historical mystery film directed by Jean-Jacques Annaud, based on the 1980 novel of the same title by Umberto Eco. Sean Connery stars as the Franciscan friar William of Baskerville, called upon to solve a deadly mystery in a medieval abbey. Christian Slater portrays his young apprentice, Adso of Melk, and F. Murray Abraham his Inquisitor rival, Bernardo Gui. Michael Lonsdale, William Hickey, Feodor Chaliapin Jr., Valentina Vargas, and Ron Perlman play supporting roles.

This English-language film was an international co-production between West German, French, and Italian companies and was filmed in Rome and at the former Eberbach Abbey in the Rheingau. It received mixed to positive reviews from critics and won several awards, including the BAFTA Award for Best Actor in a Leading Role for Sean Connery. Another adaptation was made in 2019 as a television miniseries for RAI.

== Plot ==
Franciscan friar William of Baskerville and his novice, Adso of Melk, arrive at an early 14th-century Benedictine abbey in Northern Italy. A mysterious death has occurred ahead of an important theological Church conference—a young illuminator appears to have committed suicide. William confronts the worried Abbot and gains permission to investigate the death. Over the next days, several other bizarre deaths occur.

William and Adso make the acquaintance of Salvatore, a hunchback who speaks gibberish in various languages, and his handler and protector, Remigio da Varagine. William deduces from Salvatore's use of the term "penitenziagite" that he had once been a member of a heretical sect and infers that Salvatore and Remigio may have been involved in the killings. Meanwhile, Adso encounters a peasant girl who sneaked into the abbey to trade sexual favors for food. She seduces him and has sex with him.

Investigating, William and Adso deduce that the blackened fingers and tongues of the dead monks are somehow connected with a book that has gone missing, which they endeavour to find before more monks are killed. Keen to head off accusations of the murders being the work of the Devil, the duo discovers and explores a labyrinthine library in the abbey's forbidden principal tower. William finds that it is "one of the greatest libraries in all Christendom," containing dozens of works by Classical masters such as Aristotle, thought to have been lost for centuries. The library is kept hidden because such advanced knowledge, coming from pagan philosophers, is difficult to reconcile with Christianity.

His investigations are curtailed by the arrival of Bernardo Gui of the Inquisition, summoned for the conference and keen to prosecute those he deems responsible for the deaths. William and Bernard have clashed in the past, and the zealous inquisitor has no time for theories outside his own. Salvatore and the girl are found fighting over a black cockerel while in the presence of a black cat. Gui presents this as irrefutable proof that they are in league with Satan and tortures Salvatore into a false confession. Salvatore, Remigio, and the girl are dragged before a tribunal, where Gui intimidates the Abbot into concurring with his judgment of heresy. But William, also "invited" by Gui to serve on the panel of judges, refuses to confirm the accusations of murder, pointing out that the murderer could read Greek, a skill that Remigio does not possess. Gui resorts to extracting a confession from Remigio by the threat of torture, and clearly plans to take care of William for good.

When the head Librarian succumbs like the others, William and Adso ascend the forbidden library, and come face to face with the Venerable Jorge, one of the oldest monks in the abbey, with the book they have been searching for. William deduces that the book is the only remaining copy of Aristotle's Second Book of Poetics, which describes comedy and how it may be used to teach. Believing laughter and jocularity to be instruments of the Devil, Jorge has poisoned the pages to stop the spread of what he considers dangerous ideas: those reading it would ingest the poison as they licked their fingers to aid in turning pages. Confronted, Jorge throws over a candle, starting a blaze that engulfs the library. William insists that Adso flee, as he collects an inadequate armload of invaluable books to save; the volume of Poetics, Jorge, and the rest of the library are lost.

Meanwhile, Salvatore and Remigio have been burned at the stake. The girl has been slated for the same fate but local peasants take advantage of the chaos of the library fire to free her and turn on Gui. Gui attempts to flee but they throw his wagon off a cliff, to his death. William and Adso later take their leave of the Abbey. On the road, Adso is stopped by the girl, silently appealing for him to stay with her, but Adso continues on with William.

Years later, a much older Adso reflects that he never regretted his decision, as he learned many more things from William. Adso also states that the girl was the only earthly love of his life, yet he never even learned her name.

== Cast ==
- Sean Connery as William of Baskerville
- F. Murray Abraham as Bernardo Gui
- Elya Baskin as Severinus
- Feodor Chaliapin Jr. as Jorge de Burgos
- William Hickey as Ubertino of Casale
- Michael Lonsdale as The Abbot
- Ron Perlman as Salvatore
- Volker Prechtel as Malachia
- Helmut Qualtinger as Remigio de Varagine
- Valentina Vargas as The Girl
- Christian Slater as Adso of Melk
  - Dwight Weist as older Adso (voice)
- Michael Habeck as Berengar
- Leopoldo Trieste as Michele da Cesena
- Franco Valobra as Jerome of Kaffa
- Vernon Dobtcheff as Hugh of Newcastle
- Donal O'Brian as Pietro d'Assisi
- Andrew Birkin as Cuthbert of Winchester
- Lucien Bodard as Cardinal Bertrand
- Peter Berling as Jean d'Anneaux
- Pete Lancaster as Bishop of Alborea
- Urs Althaus as Venantius
- Lars Bodin-Jorgensen as Adelmo of Otranto
- Kim Rossi Stuart as a novice

== Production ==
Director Jean-Jacques Annaud told Umberto Eco that he was convinced the book was written for only one person to direct: himself. He was intrigued by the project due to a lifelong fascination with medieval churches and a great familiarity with Latin and Greek.

Finance was raised in part from Jake Eberts at Allied.

Annaud spent four years preparing the film, traveling throughout the United States and Europe, searching for the perfect cast, focusing on a multi-ethnic cast and actors with interesting and distinctive faces. He resisted suggestions to cast Sean Connery for the part of William because he felt the character, who was already an amalgam of Sherlock Holmes and William of Occam, would become too overwhelming with "007" added. Later, after Annaud failed to find another actor he liked for the part, he was won over by Connery's reading, but Eco was dismayed by the casting choice, and Columbia Pictures pulled out because Connery's career was then in a slump.

Christian Slater was cast through a large-scale audition of teenage boys. (His mother, Mary Jo Slater, was also a prominent casting director who consulted on the film.) For the wordless scene in which the Girl seduces Adso, Annaud allowed Valentina Vargas to lead the scene without his direction. Annaud did not explain to Slater what she would be doing in order to elicit a more authentic performance from the actors.

Although U.S. casting agencies proposed only white actors for his medievalist film, Director Annaud insisted on including a black monk to play the translator Venantius. The Swiss actor Urs Althaus, who had previously been a model for the likes of Yves Saint Laurent, Calvin Klein, Valentino, Armani, Gucci, and Kenzo, was hired because Annaud considered that Moors were "intellectuals" in medieval times and therefore it made sense to have one work as a translator.

The exterior and some of the interiors of the monastery seen in the film were constructed as a replica on a hilltop outside Rome and was the biggest exterior set built in Europe since Cleopatra (1963). Many of the interiors were shot at Eberbach Abbey, Germany. Most props, including period illuminated manuscripts, were produced specifically for the film.

In 2024, a restored 4K version from the original negative was released in France, this version was dubbed into the Breton language on this occasion and broadcast on the Breton television channel Brezhoweb.

== Reception ==
The film was very successful in Germany with a gross of $25 million. However, it did poorly at the box office in the United States, where it played at 176 theaters and grossed $7.2 million. At the same time, it was popular in other parts of Europe (including Italy, France and Spain). Decades later, Sean Connery recalled that the film grossed over $60 million worldwide.

The film holds a score of 74% on review aggregator Rotten Tomatoes, based on 27 reviews, with an average rating of 6.4/10. On Metacritic, the film holds a weighted average score of 54 out of 100, based on 12 reviews, indicating "mixed or average reviews". Audiences polled by CinemaScore gave the film an average grade of "B+" on an A+ to F scale.

Roger Ebert gave the film 2.5 stars out of a possible 4, writing: "What we have here is the setup for a wonderful movie. What we get is a very confused story.... It's all inspiration and no discipline." Time Out gave the film a positive review: "As intelligent a reductio of Umberto Eco's sly farrago of whodunnit and medieval metaphysics as one could have wished for...the film simply looks good, really succeeds in communicating the sense and spirit of a time when the world was quite literally read like a book." John Simon stated that The Name of the Rose misfired due to its ending, which was slightly happier than the book's ending.

John Nubbin reviewed The Name of the Rose for Different Worlds magazine and stated that "Of course, Annaud is blowing his own horn here, but he is blowing it fairly, not really giving the film any more credit than it deserves. He has managed to cram enough of the novel and its excellent flavor into his film to be allowed a little boast. Name is something a bit different, entertaining with a little extra, and worth anyone's time. And, if you missed it, cheer up, practically everyone missed Highlander, and it's been out on tape for months now. Your chance will come."

In 2011, Eco gave a mixed review for the adaptation of his novel: "A book like this is a club sandwich, with turkey, salami, tomato, cheese, lettuce. And the movie is obliged to choose only the lettuce or the cheese, eliminating everything else – the theological side, the political side. It's a nice movie."

Ron Perlman has commented that The Name of the Rose is "one of the few films of mine that I admire without qualification.... There's only two or three projects I've ever worked on where I thought, 'Okay, I wouldn't change a thing,' and Name of the Rose is one of those. A great eye recognizes how great Name of the Rose was, and there aren't that many around; it takes a very sophisticated kind of moviegoer."

== Awards ==
- The film was awarded the César Award for Best Foreign Film.
- The film was awarded two BAFTAs: Sean Connery for Best Actor and Hasso von Hugo for Best Make Up Artist.

== See also ==
- List of films based on crime books
- List of historical period drama films
- Middle Ages in film
