= The Name of the Rose (miniseries) =

Historical drama television miniseries

- Italian: Il nome della rosa
- Genre: Historical drama; Period drama; Thriller
- Created by: Giacomo Battiato
- Based on: The Name of the Rose by Umberto Eco
- Screenplay by: Giacomo Battiato; Andrea Porporati; John Turturro; Nigel Williams
- Story by: Andrea Porporati
- Directed by: Giacomo Battiato
- Starring: John Turturro; Rupert Everett; Damian Hardung; Fabrizio Bentivoglio; Greta Scarano; Richard Sammel; Stefano Fresi; Roberto Herlitzka; Fausto Maria Sciarappa; Maurizio Lombardi; Antonia Fotaras; Guglielmo Favilla; Piotr Adamczyk; Tchéky Karyo; Benjamin Stender; Claudio Bigagli; Corrado Invernizzi; Max Malatesta; Alessio Boni; Sebastian Koch; James Cosmo; Michael Emerson
- Narrated by: Peter Davison
- Composer: Volker Bertelmann
- Countries of origin: Italy; Germany
- Original language: English
- No. of episodes: 8

Production
- Executive producers: Patrizia Massa; Herbert G. Kloiber; Herbert L. Kloiber; John Turturro; Guendalina Ponti
- Producers: Matteo Levi; Carlo Degli Esposti; Nicola Serra; Marta Aceto; Michele Zatta; Marco Camilli; Davide Nardini; Luigi Pinto; Margherita Murolo
- Production locations: Italy; France
- Cinematography: John Conroy
- Editor: Stephen O'Connell
- Running time: 50–54 minutes
- Production companies: 11 Marzo Film; Palomar; Rai Fiction

Original release
- Network: Rai 1
- Release: 4 March – 25 March 2019

The Name of the Rose (Italian: Il nome della rosa) is a 2019 historical drama television miniseries created and directed by Giacomo Battiato for RAI. It is based on the 1980 international bestseller novel of the same name by Umberto Eco. The series stars John Turturro as William of Baskerville and Rupert Everett as Bernard Gui. It was co-produced by Italian production companies 11 Marzo Film and Palomar, and distributed internationally by the Tele München Group.

The Name of the Rose premiered on 4 March 2019 on Rai 1, which commissioned the series in November 2017.

== Plot ==
In November 1327, Pope John XXII and the Emperor Louis the Bavarian are at war. The Franciscan friar William of Baskerville and his young novice Adso of Melk, reach an isolated Benedictine abbey in Northern Italy to participate in a dispute over the role of poverty in the Church. Upon arrival in the abbey, William is drawn into investigating a chain of mysterious deaths.

== Cast ==
=== Starring ===
- John Turturro as William of Baskerville, Franciscan friar.
- Rupert Everett as Bernard Gui, Dominican inquisitor.
- Damian Hardung as Adso of Melk, Benedictine novice.
  - Peter Davison narrates the events of the series from the point of view of an old Adso.
- Fabrizio Bentivoglio as Remigio of Varagine, a former Dulcinian and now cellarer of the abbey.
- Greta Scarano as Margherita, Dolcino's partner, and as their daughter Anna.
  - Kiara McKormick as Anna as a child.
- Richard Sammel as Malachi of Hildesheim, librarian of the abbey.
- Stefano Fresi as Salvatore, former Dulcinian and now papermaker of the abbey, friend of Remigio.
- Roberto Herlitzka as Alinardo of Grottaferrata, the oldest monk.
- Fausto Maria Sciarappa as Nicolas of Morimondo, monk and master glassmaker.
- Maurizio Lombardi as Berengar of Arundel, assistant librarian of the abbey.
- Antonia Fotaras as the Occitan Girl.
- Guglielmo Favilla as Venanzio of Salvemec, monk in the Scriptorium.
- Piotr Adamczyk as Severinus of Saint Emmeram, monk and herbalist.
- Tchéky Karyo as Pope John XXII.
- Benjamin Stender as Benno of Uppsala, young Scandinavian monk working in the Scriptorium.
- Claudio Bigagli as Jerome of Kaffa, Franciscan friar and bishop of the imperial delegation.
- Corrado Invernizzi as Michael of Cesena, Franciscan theologian and leader of the imperial delegation.
- Max Malatesta as Aymaro of Alessandria, amanuensis monk.
- Alessio Boni as Dolcino of Novara, leader of the Dulcinians.
- Sebastian Koch as the Baron of Neuenberg, emperor's general and Adso's father.
- James Cosmo as Jorge of Burgos, old blind monk and former librarian.
- Michael Emerson as the abbot of Fossanova Abbey.
- Rinat Khismatouline as Cardinal Bertrand du Pouget, papal legate.
- Camilla Diana as Bianca.
- David Brandon as Hugh of Newcastle, Franciscan theologian and scholastic philosopher, disciple of Duns Scotus.

=== Supporting ===
- Leonardo Pazzagli as Adelmo of Otranto, young illuminator monk in the scriptorium.
- Alfredo Pea as Pacifico of Tivoli.
- Derek Boschi as Guillam de Masan.
- Federigo Ceci as Eudes, Bishop of Carpentras.
- Diego Delpiano as Martino.
- Gianluigi Fogacci as Roberto, count of Florence.
- Nicholas Turturro as Pedro López de Luna, Aragonese politician and Archbishop of Zaragoza.

== Episodes ==
No.	Title	Directed by	Written by	Original release date	Ital. viewers (millions)
1	"Episode 1"	Giacomo Battiato	Story by : Andrea Porporati; Teleplay by : Giacomo Battiato, Andrea Porporati, John Turturro, Nigel Williams	4 March 2019	6.501
Adso of Melk, the young son of a German baron, wishes to become a monk despite his father wanting him to be a soldier. After having taken his vows as Benedictine novice, he meets William of Baskerville, a famous English Franciscan friar and decides to follow him in his spiritual journey. William is on his way to an isolated and remote Benedictine abbey of Cluniac rule, located on the top of a mountain in the Alps of northern Italy, famous for its extraordinary library which houses manuscripts of inestimable value. There will be held an important and decisive disputation on the role of the Church, to assess whether the Church should maintain its power and wealth or should be poor in imitation of Christ. William will have to represent the Franciscan Order, who espouse poverty, against the opulence of the ecclesiastical hierarchy under Avignonese Pope John XXII. Emperor Louis the Bavarian, in a power struggle with the Pope, supports the Franciscans. When William and Adso arrive, they find the abbey in turmoil for the murder of the illuminator monk Adelmo of Otranto. Abbot Abbone of Fossanova asks William to investigate the identity and motive of the mysterious murderer before the arrival of the delegation from the papal curia led by the ferocious Dominican inquisitor Bernard Gui. While William begins to question the monks, Adso notices an Occitan girl fleeing the war in her country, who lives in the forest around the abbey. At dawn on the second day, another monk, the translator Venanzio of Salvemec, is found dead in a barrel of pig's blood.
2	"Episode 2"	Giacomo Battiato	Story by : Andrea Porporati; Teleplay by : Giacomo Battiato, Andrea Porporati, John Turturro, Nigel Williams	4 March 2019	6.501
The traces of the murderer lead straight to the library in the great tower, a labyrinth forbidden to anyone except the librarian Malachi of Hildesheim and his assistant Berengar of Arundel. William understands that Adelmo committed suicide, that Venantius was poisoned and the clues seem to point to Berengar as the possible murderer. Meanwhile, Dominican inquisitor Bernard Gui, on his way to the abbey with his armed escort, carries out a massacre in Pietranera, a village considered a refuge for Dulcinian heretics, exterminating Anna's family. Anna is the secret daughter of Fra Dolcino and Margherita Boninsegna, who were both condemned to the stake many years earlier by Bernard Gui himself. The cellarer Remigio of Varagine and the deformed Salvatore had been among Dolcino's followers and are now hiding within the walls of the abbey. After finding in the scriptorium a code written by Venanzio the night he was killed, William decides to challenge the prohibition imposed by the Abbot and to enter the library. Thanks to the suggestions of the old monk Alinardo of Grottaferrata, he discovers a secret passage that starts from the church and reaches the tower where the library is located. William and Adso go up to the scriptorium and reach Venanzio's post; distracted by a noise, they notice a figure in the shadows who steals a book from Venantius's table and runs away. Subsequently, the two reach the library, wander and get lost enchanted in the labyrinth until the young man falls prey to frightening visions.
3	"Episode 3"	Giacomo Battiato	Story by : Andrea Porporati; Teleplay by : Giacomo Battiato, Andrea Porporati, John Turturro, Nigel Williams	11 March 2019	4.727
William finds Adso hallucinating in a room in the library, and discovers that someone inserts hallucinogenic substances which, if inhaled, cause visions. In another room there is an ingenious system of rotated reeds: when the wind whipped them, it cause whispers and sinister laments to keep unwanted monks away, making them believe that the library is haunted by spirits. William decides to question Salvatore about his past as a Dulcinian, but he goes away. Adso, increasingly interested in the story of the Dulcinians, asks the blind monk Jorge of Burgos, an expert on the monastery's secrets, for explanations. Meanwhile, the inquisitor Bernard Gui, on his way to the abbey, pauses at an abandoned chapel in the woods, recalling how at the time of the capture of Dolcino and Margherita, he had tried to fornicate with her, trying to make her abjure. Dolcino's secret daughter, Anna, has chased him to carry out her revenge, and she shoots an arrow at Bernard, missing him; she engages in a fight against the guards and is wounded but manages to run away. William manages to obtain new lenses (his own were stolen from him in the scriptorium together with the book that Venanzio was consulting) made by the monk and master glassmaker Nicolas of Morimondo, in order to read the parchment with the mysterious code. That same night, Adso confesses to him some of his doubts on love and women. William wanders around the abbey and finds the cellarer Remigio, questioning him about his past as a Dulcinian: he justifies his cause as the Church is deeply corrupt and deserves a shock from the inside. Meanwhile, in the bath area, the monk Alinardo begins to predict the event of the third trumpet of the Apocalypse; the bell calls the monks together, and an ominous event is foreshadowed.
4	"Episode 4"	Giacomo Battiato	Story by : Andrea Porporati; Teleplay by : Giacomo Battiato, Andrea Porporati, John Turturro, Nigel Williams	11 March 2019	4.727
The monks find the body of Berengar, who disappeared for at least one night, drowned in a bath tub. William, analyzing the corpse together with the herbalist monk Severino of Saint Emmeram, finds again the traces of the black fingers and tongue; in order to understand better the poisoning, he orders the opening of the corpse, arousing the anger of the brothers. While Anna, losing a lot of blood, seeks shelter in the woods where she cannot be chased by the guards of the inquisition, Salvatore recalls his past as a court jester: he was reduced to a pet by his masters, when suddenly one day the Dulcinians broke in and he was freed by Remigio, who had joined them. Meanwhile, Brother William manages to decipher the code of Venanzio, and that same night he returns with Adso to the library and finds a secret passage right in the smoke room, reaching the door with the cartouche ("Super thronos viginti quatuor") quoted by Venanzio and locating an unspecified finis Africae. However, he cannot access it because he cannot decipher the code "hand over the idol, press the first and seventh of four": in the room, which by symmetry with the other towers should communicate with a central room, there is a large wall mirror. The astute Franciscan discovers the way to orient himself in the labyrinth: he notes that above each door there is actually a cartouche with a passage from the Bible, and in some rooms there is a letter highlighted. By joining the first letters of the sentences of the Bible of the adjacent rooms, taking the room with the letter highlighted as the beginning, the names of the geographical areas of the world come out, and in the rooms with a certain geographical name there are the volumes of authors coming from that area. The finis Africae named by Venanzio is the farthest part of Africa, but it is walled up and the mirror is its door. Realizing that they are not alone in the library and hearing the morning bells, they leave the library once again. Adso meets again the mysterious girl from the woods and they kiss for the first time. Back in the abbey, he and William are surprised by the sudden arrival of Bernard Gui with his troops.
5	"Episode 5"	Giacomo Battiato	Story by : Andrea Porporati; Teleplay by : Giacomo Battiato, Andrea Porporati, John Turturro, Nigel Williams	18 March 2019	3.894
Anna, fallen unconscious in the woods, is found by Adso's lover and her wounds are treated. That same evening, the abbot gives a special dinner for the arrivals, while Salvatore and Remigio appear more and more nervous about the presence of the inquisitor, and they plan to suddenly abandon the abbey. Bernard strikes a friendship with Malachi, who reveals to him many irregularities regarding the ordinary duties of the abbey, which began precisely with the arrival of William. Then he mentions some papers that 15 years earlier Remigio had asked him to hide in the library. After witnessing a dispute between Alinardo and the blind monk Jorge about the validity of laughter, Bernard begins to suspect about Remigio and orders to summon him on that same evening, even if he cannot be found. Adso and the girl meet again and have sex, while in the bath area Bernard finally bumps into Remigio and questions him. Sensing the monk's nervousness, Bernard decides not to ask many questions, postponing the interrogation, since he expects a new crime or misdeed. Later the long awaited disputation on the question of the poverty of Christ and of the Church begins. Very soon the calm disputation turns into a heated fight between the two parties, so much so that the abbot is forced to suspend the works. In the wood the Occitan girl is captured by Salvatore, who wants to be "loved" by her, and takes her to the paper mill, because he has in mind a satanic rite in which the girl must make her part.
6	"Episode 6"	Giacomo Battiato	Story by : Andrea Porporati; Teleplay by : Giacomo Battiato, Andrea Porporati, John Turturro, Nigel Williams	18 March 2019	3.894
Malachi and Bernard have another meeting, in which the inquisitor openly declares that he knows about the relationship between him and Berengar. Malachi is frightened and asks Bernard to have garrisons to guard both the library and the other strategic places of the abbey. Adso meets Salvatore, who has a black cat in a sack, which he will need for his satanic ritual so that he can become beautiful. In the meantime, a recovered Anna is hiding among the commoners who go to Remigio to sell agricultural products. Remigio immediately recognizes her and manages to convince her not to kill Bernard Gui, but promises to bring her Fra Dolcino's papers. Before the debates on the question of poverty resume, the monk Severino reveals to William that he has found a "strange book" in the laboratory. William orders him to shut himself in his study and watch the book. While the monks return, there are also Malachi, who has overheard the whole conversation, and Remigio, who begs him to return Dolcino's letters to him. During the disputation, the works are again interrupted: Severino was killed in his study with a spherical astrolabe thrown at his head, and the laboratory was turned upside down. Bernard Gui finds Remigio in there, immediately suspecting him and having him arrested, while he claims to have found Severino already dead. William notices that Severino was wearing gloves, so he has no black fingers, having handled the book with caution. Adso claims that Remigio cannot be connected with the murder: while he was on his way to the abbey for the dispute, he had seen Remigio outside the study, which had the door already locked. After having looked through the various books, hoping to find the famous one written in Greek, William gives up and decides to leave the room. However, later Adso reminds him that some books are recycled by others, and that therefore a volume can have various treatises in different languages. However, after they return to Severino's study, they realize that the book which began in Arabic, and which they had already gone through, has disappeared. The work on the disputation are momentarily interrupted until the end of the interrogation that Bernard has prepared for Remigio, who is led in chains after being tortured. Meanwhile Adso discovers, thanks to her whistles, that the girl is a prisoner in Salvatore's paper mill, who is performing the satanic rite. They have a fight, but Salvatore makes Adso slip into the torrent. Bernard was informed by Malachi that he had seen Salvatore with a black cat, and sends his troops to break into the paper mill, arresting both the deformed monk and the girl.
7	"Episode 7"	Giacomo Battiato	Story by : Andrea Porporati; Teleplay by : Giacomo Battiato, Andrea Porporati, John Turturro, Nigel Williams	25 March 2019	3.960
While the Occitan girl and the monk Salvatore are imprisoned, Adso returns to the abbey and has William medicate him. The following day Bernard Gui goes to Salvatore to extort precious information about the past of Friar Remigio and about the demonic nature of the girl, whom he considers a witch for having participated in the ritual of the black cat. Anna has never left the monastery as she is eager both to kill Bernard and to get back the letters of her father Dolcino from Remigio. She tries to free the girl who took care of her in the woods, but a monk manages to raise the alarm and Anna remains a "prisoner" in a hidden corner of the prisons. Friar Remigio is once again questioned by Bernard, who also accuses him of the murders that took place in the abbey. William has a different opinion, and moreover he does not tolerate the coercive and ferocious methods of the Dominican, first of all torture, since it would make the prisoner say anything to avoid further pain. To corroborate Bernard's accusations, the librarian Malachi is summoned, showing Friar Dolcino's papers; thanks also to Salvatore's testimony, Bernard manages to extort, under threat of new torture, a made-up confession from Remigio. In the evening the monks pray for Remigio's soul, but the rite is interrupted by the death of Malachi, who suddenly falls to the ground in front of everybody: William and Adso notice that he has a black tongue.
8	"Episode 8"	Giacomo Battiato	Story by : Andrea Porporati; Teleplay by : Giacomo Battiato, Andrea Porporati, John Turturro, Nigel Williams	25 March 2019	3.960
Bernard Gui cannot explain Malachi's death, since he believed he had caught the murderer, but he is too interested in returning to Avignon to hand over the prisoners to the Pope. In the evening Adso tries to understand the reasons for Bernard's hatred towards the girl, who obviously is not a witch, and Brother William manages to find a method to free her. The following day he talks with Bernard, threatening him to report him to the Pope for having committed murder during the execution of Dolcino and Margherita, since he himself had replaced the secular arm to start the stake, which was forbidden. Reluctantly, Bernard is made to promise to free the Occitan girl, but he secretly orders the guards to burn her the same night as he leaves for Avignon with the two heretical prisoners. William and Adso meet Benno, who had become Malachi's assistant after Berengar's death, but whom the abbot has now appointed cellarer. He confesses that he took the mysterious book in Severino's study to give it back to Malachi. Benno had also realized, arriving at the final part of the Greek text, that the paper was strange and the pages glued. William meets the Abbot and claims to have reached the final point of his investigations, naming the forbidden finis Africae. The Abbot is upset that William has violated his ban on access to the library and dismisses him from the investigations. William is furious and decides to enter the library that same night, having guessed who the killer is. The abbot also enters the library but is fatally trapped by a protective mechanism. William and Adso enter the library and, thanks to Adso's intuition, manage to enter the finis Africae, where the blind monk Jorge already awaits them. He and William engage in a long discussion about the mysterious book (the second book of the Poetics of Aristotle, which deals with comedy). Jorge himself had the poison taken from Severino's study to glue the pages to kill the curious. He particularly detests that book as it, invested with the authority of Aristotle, would allow humans to laugh at everything, even at God. Jorge, himself the librarian before he lost his sight, had Malachi installed as librarian to act as his "straw man" that he could maneuver as he pleased and hide the forbidden books in the hidden room of the finis Africae. By chance the deaths that began with Adelmo of Otranto retraced the first five of the seven trumpets of the Apocalypse: Adelmo, having fornicated with Berengar to obtain the secret of the book, committed suicide overwhelmed by guilt; Venanzio and Berengar were both poisoned by the book; to retrieve the book Malachi killed Severino and then, after reading the book out of curiosity, died of the poison. William, despite admiring Jorge's skills, wants to submit him to trial; however Jorge extinguishes the candle, grabs the poisoned book and tries to lock William and Adso inside the secret room. When they manage to relight the torches, Jorge is trying to destroy the book by eating it. In the struggle, the candle falls on some books: the fire soon spreads around the room and Jorge throws himself with the book into the flames, while William and Adso try in vain to extinguish the fire and save the books. During the night the Occitan girl is taken to the square of the abbey to be burned, but Anna points a knife to Bernard's throat, ordering him to let her go. However, while everybody is distracted by the fire from the library tower, a guard stabs Anna. She dies after having confided to Adso that the girl escaped. As the monks, joined by Salvatore and Remigio, try to extinguish the fire, an indifferent Bernard leaves for Avignon. Remigio burns and the old Alinardo is run over by runaway horses. The abbey burns and is abandoned by the monks; before departing from Adso, William tells the boy that a rose, after having lost its perfection and withered, in the end would have nothing but its name.

== Production ==
Filming began in 2018. The miniseries was shot in Italy and in particular in Abruzzo: at the gorges of Fara San Martino, in Roccamorice, at the hermitage of Santo Spirito a Majella and at the castle of Roccascalegna. Other panoramas were shot in Perugia and Bevagna, while churches and cloisters were reconstructed in the Cinecittà studios in Rome. Other scenes were shot in the Vulci archaeological natural park in the territory of Montalto di Castro and in the Tusculum Archaeological Cultural Park.

Dialogue in Occitan language was translated and supervised in collaboration with the University of Salerno.

== Distribution ==
In Italy, the miniseries made its world premiere on 4 March 2019 on Rai 1. It premiered on 5 March 2019 on OCS in France, on 23 May 2019 on Sundance TV in the United States, on 24 May 2019 on Sky Deutschland in Germany, on 3 October 2019 on SBS in Australia, on 11 October 2019 on BBC Two in the United Kingdom, and on 3 July 2022 on KBS 1TV in South Korea.
