= Poenitentiam agite =

Latin exhortation to repent

The Latin term poenitentiam agite is used in the first of the Ninety-Five Theses of Martin Luther, and variously translated into English as 'repent' or 'do penance'. The phrase was also used as a rallying cry by the Dulcinian movement and its predecessors, the Apostolic Brethren, two radical movements of the Medieval period.

The term is part of the larger quotation from St. Jerome's Vulgate translation of Matthew 3:2 (as said by John the Baptist) and Matthew 4:17 (as repeated by Jesus of Nazareth): Pœnitentiam agite: appropinquavit enim regnum cælorum ('Do penance, for the kingdom of heaven is at hand').

The term is translated from the original Greek command μετανοεῖτε (metanoeite), which some post-Vulgate translators (including Erasmus) alternatively render in Latin as resipiscite – a translation that favors the connotation of changing one's internal state of mind, rather than the connotation of engaging in external penitential action. The Greek μετανοεῖτε is alternatively translated within the Vulgate at Mark 1:15 as pœnitemini, a translation more similar in connotation to resipiscite. The translational issue is often used to justify positions on the subject of sacramental penance.

== In popular culture ==
The shortened rallying cry Penitenziagite exposes two monks as former members of the Dulcinian movement in The Name of the Rose, a novel by Umberto Eco and the 1986 film of the same name by Jean-Jacques Annaud.
