= Nicholas of Freising =

- Other name: Nicholas the Minorite
- Occupations: Monk, author
- Notable work: Chronicle of Nicholas the Minorite

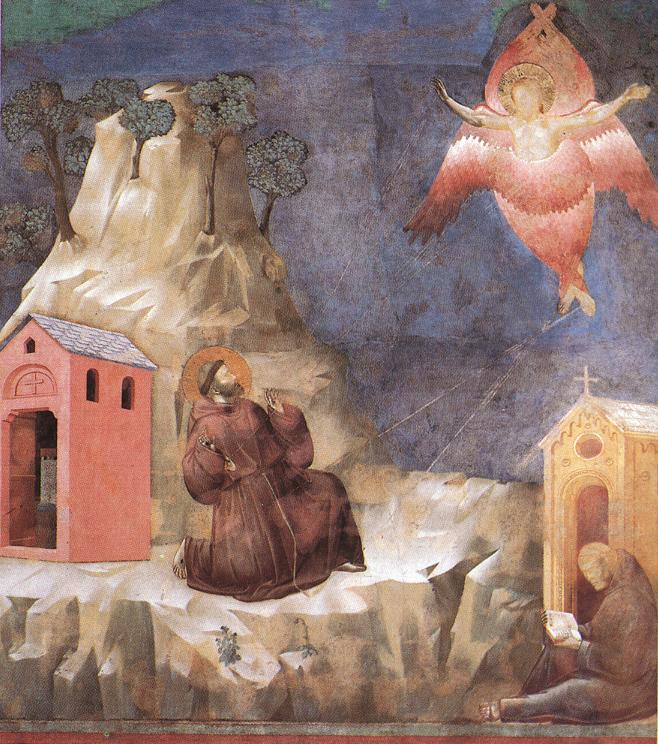
Fresco depicting St. Francis, inspiration of Christian mendicants vowing to lead lives of poverty. (Attributed to Giotto)

Nicholas of Freising, commonly known as Nicholas the Minorite, was a member of the Franciscan Order during the early 14th Century. He is presumed to be the author of the Chronicle of Nicholas the Minorite, an account of the conflict over Apostolic poverty under the reign of Pope John XXII. The Chronicle was written or assembled as early as 1338.

== Chronicle of Nicholas the Minorite ==
The Chronicle of Nicholas the Minorite tells the story of how some Fraticelli, including Michael of Cesena and his followers Bonagrazia de Cesena and William of Ockham, came into conflict with Pope John XXII at his papal court in Avignon, were declared heretics, and ultimately sought refuge with Holy Roman Emperor Louis IV. Nicholas' Chronicle is primarily an assemblage of texts written by major participants in the conflict, and includes a narrative linking them together. While papal bulls such as Quia nonnumquam and Quia vir reprobus were circulated throughout Christendom, the Chronicle is the only surviving record of other texts documenting the dispute.

== About the author ==
In the narrative of the Chronicle the author introduces himself as "I brother Nicholas of the Order of the Friars Minor." The name "Nicholas" is never mentioned however by the Chronicle's primary texts, which refer to the author as "brother N." One of the witnesses to Michael of Cesena's 1330 appeal against John XXII's papal bull Quia vir reprobus was a "Nicholas of Freising," a Fraticelli and follower of Cesena (Michaelist) from the Bavarian town of Freising, and this same Nicholas remains the most likely author of the Chronicle. The similarities between the writings of Michael of Cesena and the narrative of the Chronicle demonstrate that Nicholas derived much of his information, and theological perspective, from Cesena himself.

== See also ==
- Jean de Beaune
- Michael of Cesena
- Pope John XXII
- Fraticelli
