= William Hickey (actor) =

American actor, theatre director, and teacher (1927–1997)

- William Hickey, c. 1960s
- Born: William Edward Hickey; September 19, 1927; New York City, New York, U.S.
- Died: June 29, 1997 (aged 69); New York City, New York, U.S.
- Resting place: Cemetery of the Evergreens
- Other name: Bill Hickey
- Occupations: Actor, theatre director, teacher
- Years active: 1938–1997
- Height: 5 ft 6 in (168 cm)

William Edward Hickey (September 19, 1927 – June 29, 1997) was an American actor, theatre director, and acting teacher. Known for his gravelly voice and offbeat appearance, he appeared in over 100 stage, film and television productions between 1948 and 1997. He was nominated for an Academy Award for Best Supporting Actor for his portrayal of aging mafia Don Corrado Prizzi in John Huston's Prizzi's Honor (1985).

He was also known to film audiences for his roles as the Historian in Little Big Man (1970), Ubertino of Casale in the film adaptation of Umberto Eco's The Name of the Rose (1986), Uncle Lewis in National Lampoon's Christmas Vacation (1989), the first iteration of André Toulon in cult horror film Puppet Master (also 1989), and the voice of Dr. Finkelstein in the animated film The Nightmare Before Christmas (1993). Hickey was also a longtime teacher at the HB Studio in New York City.

== Early life ==
Hickey was born in Brooklyn, New York, the son of Edward and Nora Hickey, both of Irish descent. He had an older sister, Dorothy Finn. He grew up in Flatbush, Brooklyn, and Richmond Hill, Queens.

== Career ==
Hickey began his career as a child actor on the variety stage, and began acting on the radio in 1938. He made his Broadway debut as a walk-on in the 1951 production of George Bernard Shaw's Saint Joan, starring Uta Hagen. He performed often during the golden age of television, including appearances on Studio One and the Philco Playhouse. He was a staple of Ben Bagley's New York musical revues; he can be heard on several of the recordings, notably Decline and Fall of the Entire World as Seen Through the Eyes of Cole Porter.

Notable for his unique, gravelly voice and somewhat offbeat appearance, Hickey, in his later years, was often cast in "cantankerous-but-clever old man" roles. His characters, who sometimes exuded an underlying air of the macabre, usually had the last laugh over their more sprightly co-stars. His early roles was that of a suspect in the 1968 film The Boston Strangler, as well as a historian in Little Big Man (1970) and a gangster in Mikey & Nicky (1976).

One of his most notable onscreen roles was that of the gravelly voiced Don Corrado Prizzi in Prizzi's Honor (1985), for which he was nominated for the Academy Award for Best Supporting Actor. Hickey portrayed Don Corrado as sharp-witted and cunning, despite his frail physical state, and shared key scenes with Anjelica Huston and Jack Nicholson. His subsequent roles included Al Pacino's father in Sea of Love (1989), the master puppeteer in Puppet Master (1989), Uncle Lewis in National Lampoon's Christmas Vacation (1989), the voice of Dr. Finkelstein in Tim Burton's The Nightmare Before Christmas (1993), and Debra Winger's father in Forget Paris (1995).

=== Teaching ===
Hickey's most important contribution to the arts, however, remains his teaching career at the HB Studio in Greenwich Village, founded by Herbert Berghof. Steve McQueen, George Segal, Sandy Dennis, and Barbra Streisand all studied under him. He kept a flask behind the sink in the basement studio of HB where he taught. He stated it helped him cope with bad acting.

== Personal life ==
Hickey was a longtime resident of Greenwich Village.

=== Death ===
Aged 69, Hickey died at Beth Israel Medical Center on June 29, 1997, where he was being treated for from emphysema and bronchitis. He was interred in the Cemetery of the Evergreens in Brooklyn.

At the time, Hickey was filming of Uzo's Better Than Ever. His scenes were finished by the producer in a pick-up shot depicting his character in the hospital. His final movie, Knocking on Death's Door (1999, in which he plays the town sheriff), was released nearly two years after his death. The movie Mouse Hunt (1997, in which he also appeared) was dedicated to his memory.

== Filmography ==
=== Film ===
Year	Title	Role	Notes
1957	A Hatful of Rain	Apples	
1957	Operation Mad Ball	Sampson	Uncredited
1961	Something Wild	Bit part	Uncredited
1964	Invitation to a Gunfighter	Jo-Jo	
1967	The Producers	The Drunk	
1968	The Boston Strangler	Eugene T. O'Rourke	
1970	Little Big Man	The Historian	
1971	A New Leaf	Smith	Uncredited
1971	The Telephone Book	Man in Bed	
1971	Happy Birthday, Wanda June	Looseleaf Harper	
1975	92 In The Shade	Mr. Skelton	
1976	Mikey & Nicky	Sid Fine	
1977	The Sentinel	Perry	
1978	Nunzio		
1979	Wise Blood	Preacher	
1982	A Stranger Is Watching	Maxi	
1985	Prizzi's Honor	Don Corrado Prizzi	
1985	Walls of Glass	Papa	
1985	Remo Williams: The Adventure Begins	Coney Island Barker	
1986	One Crazy Summer	Old Man Beckersted	
1986	Seize the Day	Perls	
1986	The Name of the Rose	Ubertino of Casale	
1988	Bright Lights, Big City	Ferret Man	
1988	Da	Drumm	
1988	Starlight: A Musical Movie	Billy Davis	
1989	Sons	Roger	
1989	Puppet Master	André Toulon	
1989	Pink Cadillac	Mr. Barton	
1989	Sea of Love	Frank Keller, Sr.	
1989	It Had to Be You	Schornberg	
1989	National Lampoon's Christmas Vacation	Uncle Lewis Griswold	
1990	Tales from the Darkside: The Movie	Drogan	Segment: "Cat From Hell"
1990	Any Man's Death	Erich Schiller / Ernst Bauricke	
1990	Mob Boss	Don Anthony	
1990	My Blue Heaven	Billy Sparrow	
1991	The Runestone	Lars Hagstrom	
1993	The Nightmare Before Christmas	Doctor Finkelstein (voice)	
1994	Hey Stranger	Majordomo	
1995	The Jerky Boys: The Movie	Don 'Uncle Freddy' Frederico	
1995	Major Payne	Dr. Phillips	
1995	Forget Paris	Arthur	
1995	The Maddening	Mr. Scudder	
1996	Love Is All There Is	Monsignor	
1996	Twisted	Andre	
1997	Better Than Ever	Walter	Posthumous release
1997	Mouse Hunt	Rudolf Smuntz	Posthumous release
1999	A tekerölantos naplója		Posthumous release
1999	Knocking on Death's Door	Sheriff	Posthumous release

=== Television ===
Year	Title	Role(s)	Notes
1952	The Philco Television Playhouse		1 episode
1956-77	Camera Three	Various	7 episodes
1956-57	Studio One	Jonesy, Paul Richards, Soldier	3 episodes
1957	The Phil Silvers Show	Roger K. Bellman, Jr.	1 episode
1958	Decoy	Billy	1 episode
1959	Lamp Unto My Feet	Henry	1 episode
1959	The DuPont Show of the Week	Toby Crackit	1 episode
1959-60	Startime	Bill, The Painter	2 episodes
1960	Armstrong Circle Theatre	Joe the Glom	1 episode
1960	The Eternal Light		1 episode
1961	Westinghouse Preview Theatre	Carter	1 episode
1962	The DuPont Show of the Week	Clerk	2 episodes
1962	The Defenders	Hary Lewis	1 episode
1963	The Nurses	Jason Conners	1 episode
1964	The Reporter	Roy	1 episode
1964	Mr. Broadway	Otis	1 episode
1966	Hawk	Chi-Chi	1 episode
1967	Androcles and the Lion	Ox Driver, Lionkeeper	TV movie
1967	Saint Joan	The Steward	TV movie
1969	N.Y.P.D.	Owen Makla	1 episode
1972	Between Time and Timbuktu	Sonny Stevenson	TV movie
1972-73	The Doctors	Tennessee Eddie Hawkins	3 episodes
1977	The Andros Targets	Riley Connor	1 episode
1978	Sesame Street	Doctor	1 episode
1982	The Edge of Night	Al Decker	1 episode
1983	As the World Turns	Ike Slattery	2 episodes
1984	One Life to Live	John Rupert	
1985	Izzy and Moe	Desk Clerk	TV movie
1985	Ryan's Hope	Monsignor Farrell	7 episodes
1986	Stranded	Mr. Pierson	TV movie
1986	The Equalizer	Tom Clark	1 episode ("Counterfire")
1986	Tales from the Darkside	Mr. Nis	1 episode ("The Circus")
1986	Guiding Light	Joe Kowalski	3 episodes
1987	Moonlighting	Mr. Kendall	1 episode
1987	Spenser: For Hire	Gus Harley	1 episode
1987	A Hobo's Christmas	Cincinnati Harold	TV movie
1988	The Tracey Ullman Show	Claude	1 episode
1988	Crime Story	Judge Neville Harmon	1 episode
1989	Miami Vice	Hans Kozak	1 episode ("Victims of Circumstance")
1990	Tales From The Crypt	Carlton Webster	1 episode ("The Switch")
1991	Baby Talk	Cecil Fogarty	10 episodes
1992-94	Wings	Carlton Blanchard	3 episodes
1993	L.A. Law	Tommy Mullaney, Sr.	2 episodes
1993	TriBeCa	Morgue Attendant	1 episode
1994	The Adventures of Pete & Pete	Grandpa Wrigley	1 episode
1995	The Outer Limits	Harlan Hawkes	1 episode ("White Light Fever")
1995	The Wright Verdicts	Bishop Downey	1 episode

== Stage credits ==
Year	Title	Role	Venue	Notes
1948	Hamlet	Francisco	Cherry Lane Theatre, New York City	
1951	Saint Joan	Ensemble member	Cort Theatre, New York City	
1952	Tovarich	Concierge	New York City Center, New York City	Also assist. stage manager
1952	Tovarich	Concierge	U.S. tour	Also assist. stage manager
1954	Mardi Gras	Jimmy	Locust Theatre, Philadelphia	
1954	The Lady's Not for Burning	—N/a	U.S. tour	As director
1955	Amédée, or How to Get Rid of It	Amédée	Tempo Playhouse, New York City	
1956	The Lesser Comores	Chandra	Bucks County Playhouse, New Hope	
1956	Don Juan	Pierrot	Downtown Theatre, New York City	
1957	Miss Lonelyhearts	Fats Goldsmith	Music Box Theatre, New York City	
1958	The Body Beautiful	Albert	Broadway Theatre, New York City	
1958	The Winter's Tale	Young Shepherd	American Shakespeare Theatre, Stratford	
1958	Hamlet	Second Gravedigger	American Shakespeare Theatre, Stratford	
1958	A Midsummer Night's Dream	Francis Flute	American Shakespeare Theatre, Stratford	
1958-59	Make a Million	Bernie Leeds	U.S. East Coast tour	
1959	The Moon Birds	Etienne Perisson	Cort Theatre, New York City	
1959	On the Town	Ozzie	Carnegie Hall, New York City	
1959	The Queen and the Rebels	Scaltivo	Bucks County Playhouse, New Hope	
1960	The Tempest	Trinculo	American Shakespeare Theatre, Stratford	
1960	Twelfth Night	Fabian	American Shakespeare Theatre, Stratford	
1960	A Midsummer Night's Dream	Francis Flute	U.S. tour	
1960	The Devils	Adam	Mark Taper Forum, Los Angeles	
1961	All You Need Is One Good Break	—N/a	Phoenicia Playhouse, Phoenicia	As director
1961	Twelfth Night	Sir Andrew Aguecheek	American Shakespeare Theatre, Stratford	
1961	The Undercover Lover	Boats	Adelphi College Summer Theatre	Workshop
1961	Do You Know the Milky Way?	—N/a	Billy Rose Theater, New York City	As director
1962	Not Enough Rope	Claude	Maidman Playhouse, New York City	Also director
1962	Step on a Crack	Bagdad	Ethel Barrymore Theatre, New York City	
1963	Name of a Soup	—N/a	HB Studio, New York City	As director
1964	On the Necessity of Being Polygamous	—N/a	Gramercy Theatre, New York City	Consultant
1964	Diary of a Madman	Poprishchin	Gramercy Theatre, New York City	Also director
1964	The Cradle Will Rock	—N/a	Carnegie Hall, New York City	
1965	The Decline and Fall of the Entire World as Seen Through the Eyes of Cole Porter	Performer	Square East, New York City	
1966	This Winter's Hobby	Arnold	Shubert Theatre, New Haven	
1966	This Winter's Hobby	Arnold	Walnut Street Theatre, Philadelphia	
1968	Androcles and the Lion	Centurion	American Shakespeare Theatre, Stratford	
1968	Love's Labour's Lost	Costard	American Shakespeare Theatre, Stratford	
1969	Much Ado About Nothing	Second Watch	American Shakespeare Theatre, Stratford	
1969	Hamlet	Second Gravedigger	American Shakespeare Theatre, Stratford	
1970	Next	Marion Cheever	Greenwich Mews Theatre, New York City	Replacement
1970-71	Happy Birthday, Wanda June	Looseleaf Harper	Theatre de Lys, New York City	
1970-71	Happy Birthday, Wanda June	Looseleaf Harper	Edison Theatre, New York City	
1972	Small Craft Warnings	Steve	Truck and Warehouse Theater, New York City	
1972	Mourning Becomes Electra	Seth Beckwith	Circle in the Square Theatre, New York City	
1973	Siamese Connections	Grandmother Kroner	Public Theater, New York City	
1973	Troilus and Cressida	Pandarus, Calchas	Mitzi E. Newhouse Theater, New York City	
1974-75	Thieves	Johnny MacDonald, Street Man	Broadhurst Theatre, New York City	
1974-75	Thieves	Johnny MacDonald, Street Man	Longacre Theatre, New York City	
1975	Finn Mackool, the Grand Distraction	Father	Lucille Lortel Theatre, New York City	
1980	Sunday Runners in the Rain		Public Theatre, New York City	Workshop
1982	Don Juan	Dimanche	Delacorte Theater, New York City	
1984	Romance Language	Ralph Waldo Emerson, Mitch Bouyer	Playwrights Horizons, New York City	
1985	Angelo's Wedding	Uncle Salvatore	Circle in the Square Theatre, New York City	
1985	Lippe	Lippe	Quaigh Theatre, New York City	
1986-87	Arsenic and Old Lace	Dr. Einstein	46th Street Theatre, New York City	
1992	A Terrible Beauty	Pat McCann	Provincetown Playhouse, New York City	
1994	Spared		Byrdcliffe Theater, Woodstock	

== Awards and nominations ==
Ceremony	Category	Work	Result	Ref.
58th Academy Awards	Best Supporting Actor	Prizzi's Honor	Nominated	
11th Los Angeles Film Critics Association Awards	Best Supporting Actor	Prizzi's Honor	Nominated	
20th National Society of Film Critics Awards	Best Supporting Actor	Prizzi's Honor	2nd Place	
42nd Primetime Emmy Awards	Outstanding Guest Actor in a Drama Series	Tales from the Crypt ("The Switch")	Nominated	
