= Jean de Beaune =

14th-century Dominican inquisitor

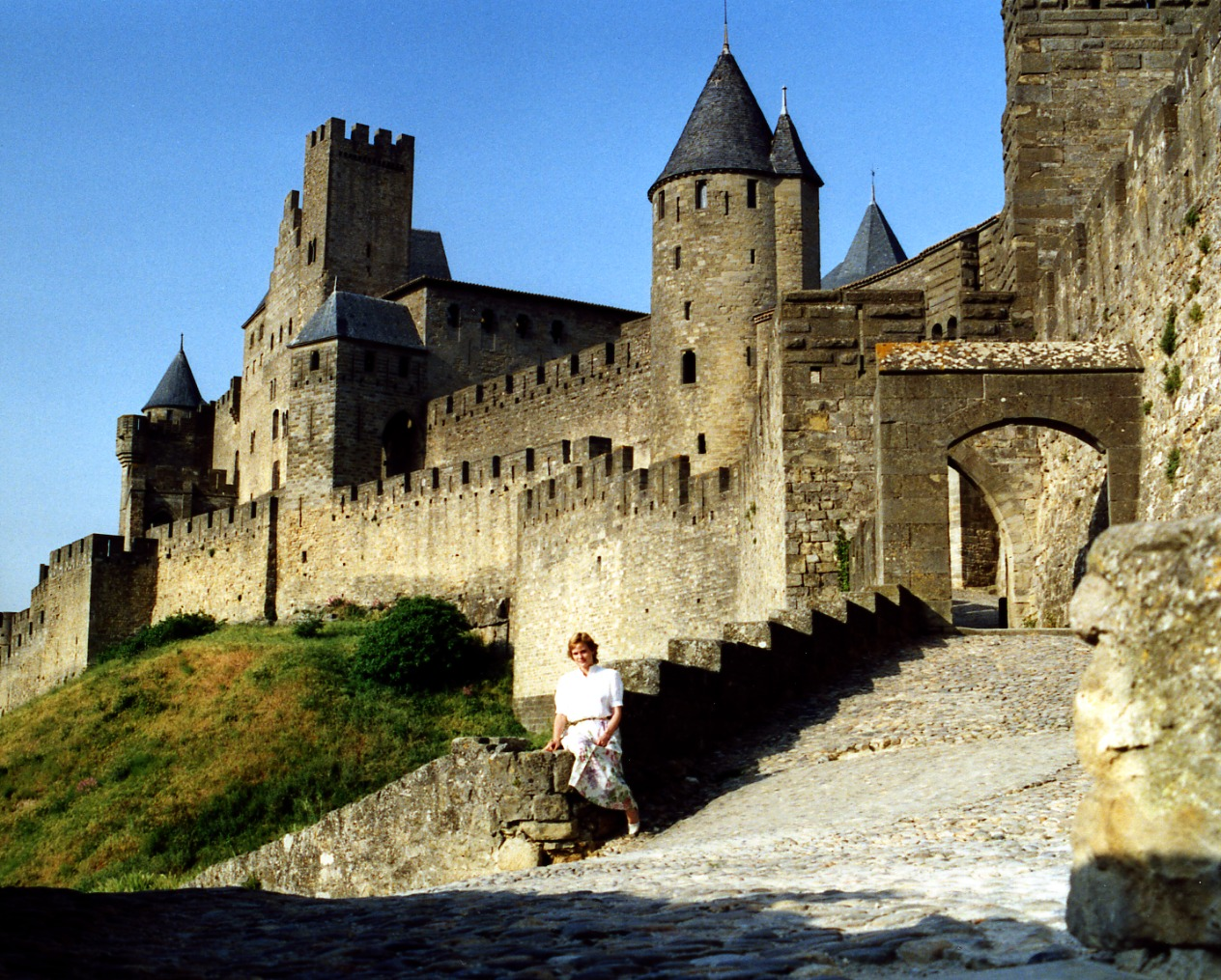
Fortress in the city of Carcassonne, where Jean de Beaune served as an inquisitor.

Jean de Beaune was a Dominican inquisitor in Carcassonne during the early 14th century who played a role in precipitating the Apostolic poverty controversy of the period.

As related by Nicholas the Minorite, in 1320 de Beaune was ordered to carry out a harsh sentence of solitary confinement against Spiritual Franciscan and heretic Bernard Délicieux, who died in his custody.

In 1321, de Beaune arrested a Beguine, or lay associate of the Franciscan Order, for heresy in Narbonne, accusing her of asserting that Christ and his followers had owned no possessions either individually or in common. A local Franciscan lector named Talon Berengar objected, invoking Pope Nicholas III's 1279 Papal Bull Exiit qui seminat, which proclaimed that "the poverty obliged by the rule was taught and lived by Our Lord." Berengar at that time held a teaching position at Narbonne formerly occupied by mendicant Peter Olivi. De Beaune demanded Berengar recant, and in response the friar appealed to the Apostolic see for protection.

Following de Beaune's confrontation with Berengar, the latter was arrested in Avignon, and in 1322 Pope John XXII responded to Exiit qui seminat by issuing his own bull Quia nonnumquam, allowing contemporary papal reinterpretation of past papal decrees.

Historian David Burr suggests that the confrontation between Jean de Beaune and Talon Berengar "has an almost mythic quality" because the theological and political dispute between them, though they were minor figures themselves, went on to open a major rift between the Franciscan Order and Catholic Church.

== See also ==
- Fraticelli
- Pope John XXII
- Apostolic poverty
