= Ubertino of Casale =

Italian Franciscan

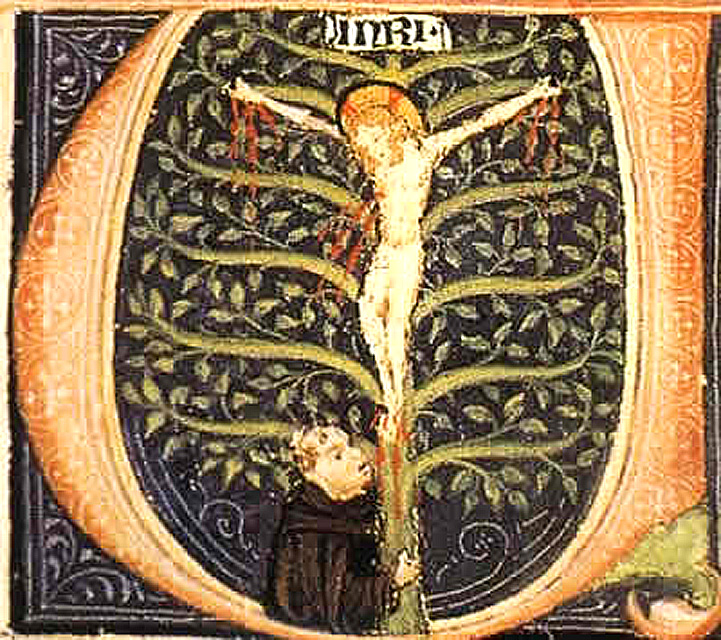
Ubertino of Casale and the Crucified Jesus.

Ubertino of Casale (1259 – c. 1329) was an Italian Franciscan and one of the leaders (together with Michael of Cesena) of the Spirituals, the stricter branch of the Franciscan order.

== Life ==
Ubertino was born in Casale Monferrato. He assumed the Franciscan habit in a convent of the province of Genoa in 1273, and was sent to Paris to continue his studies, where he remained for nine years, after which he returned to Italy. In 1285 he visited the sanctuaries of Rome, and thence proceeded to Greccio, near Rieti, to see John of Parma, who was considered as the patriarch of the Spiritual Friars. Afterwards, he settled in Tuscany and in 1287, at Florence, where he came under the influence of Pierre-Jean Olivi. He held a lectorship at Santa Croce, Florence, but abandoned it after a few years to dedicate himself to preaching, especially at Florence. Being a man of genius, but of an eccentric and restless character, he soon became the leader of the Spirituals in Tuscany.

The Spirituals espoused poverty as obligatory and insisted on a stricter interpretation of the Rule of Saint Francis. They publicly criticized the government of the order and Popes Gregory IX and Nicholas III, who had favoured a moderate interpretation of the rule, and Pope Innocent III, who had disapproved of the teaching of Joachim of Fiore, as heretics. Therefore, Ubertino was summoned before Pope Benedict XI, forbidden to preach at Perugia, and banished to the convent of Monte Alverna. During his banishment, Ubertino wrote the Arbor Vitae Crucifixae Jesu Christi (The Tree of the Crucified Life of Jesus), exalting a literal interpretation of the Rule of St. Francis and the poverty of Christ. He mentions having met the mystic Angela of Foligno, who helped him resolve some unspecified inner difficulties.

In the book, Ubertino identified Pope Boniface VIII, another opponent of the Spirituals, and Benedict XI as the first and second beasts of the Apocalypse. The text circulated widely amongst the Canons Regular of the Windesheim Congregation, and was an important influence on John of Schoonhoven's De passione Domini.

Ubertino had many protectors and admirers. In 1307, he was chosen chaplain and familiar to Cardinal Napoleone Orsini Frangipani, cardinal-protector of the Spirituals of the Marches of Ancona, but which protectorate soon ceased by the election of Boniface VIII in December 1294. In 1308, when Orsini went to Germany, Ubertino moved to France.

In 1312-13, he was called to Avignon with other chiefs of the Spirituals to discuss before the pope the questions at issue between the two parties in the order. During discussions, he attacked the moderate majority of his order and demanded separate convents and provinces for his party. But this was absolutely denied, whilst on the other hand the question of the practical observance of poverty was settled by the famous Bull Exivi de paradiso, 6 May 1312, partly called forth by the polemical writings of Ubertino.

Ubertino stayed with Cardinal Giacomo Colonna until 1317, when Pope John XXII allowed him to leave the Franciscan order and enter the Benedictine Abbey of Gembloux, in the Diocese of Liège. Since Ubertino did not stop involving himself in the conflicts among Franciscans, he was excommunicated in 1318. In 1322, Ubertino was called back to Avignon by the Pope to give his opinion on a controversy between Dominicans and Franciscans concerning the poverty of Jesus Christ and the Apostles. Ubertino asserted that Christ and the Apostles, though they had rejected all property of private persons, made use of goods and money for necessities and alms as ministers of religion. This response was well received by Pope John XXII.

Ubertino remained in Avignon, in the service of Cardinal Orsini, until 1325, when he was accused of heresy for having defended the condemned opinions of his teacher Peter Olivi. While the Pope commanded the general of the Franciscans to have him arrested as a heretic, Ubertino probably went to Germany to seek the protection of Louis the Bavarian, whom he is said to have accompanied on his way to Rome in 1328.

Afterwards, Ubertino disappeared from the historical record. Some suppose that he left the Benedictines in 1332 to join the Carthusians, while the 15th century Fraticelli venerated him as a saint and a martyr. Dante mentioned him in his Comedy, as a supporter of stricter Franciscan rules.

== References in popular culture ==
Ubertino appears as a minor, yet important character in Umberto Eco's historical novel The Name of the Rose (1980), and its film adaptation, where Ubertino is played by William Hickey.

== Modern editions ==
- Ubertino, Arbor vitae crucifixae Christi, (1485; reprinted Turin: Bottega d'Erasmo, 1961)
