= Corporate poverty =

Refusal to own property, individually or corporately

Corporate poverty is the practice of refusing to own property, either individually or corporately. This practice of Middle Ages religious communities developed based on Christian views on poverty and wealth. Practical considerations generally allow for some exceptions.

== See also ==
- Simple living – Simplified, minimalistic lifestyle
- Absolute poverty of Christ – Franciscan doctrine of the 13th century
- Privilegium Paupertatis, 1216 papal bull by Innocent III approving corporate poverty for the Poor Clares
