= Apostolic Brethren =

13th-century sect in northern Italy

The Apostolic Brethren (sometimes referred to as Apostolici, Apostoli, or Apostolics) were a Christian sect founded in northern Italy in the latter half of the 13th century by Gerard Segarelli, a native of Alzano in the territory of Parma. He was of low birth and without education, applied for membership in the Franciscan order at Parma, and was rejected. Ultimately he resolved to devote himself to the restoration of what he conceived to be the apostolic manner of life. Most of the spirit of the movement continued in the Dulcinian movement.

== History ==
In roughly 1260, Segarelli assumed a costume patterned after representations which he had seen of the apostles, sold his house, scattered the price in the market-place, and went out to preach repentance as a mendicant brother. He found disciples, and the new order of penitents spread throughout Lombardy and beyond it. At first the Franciscans and other churchmen only scoffed at Segarelli's eccentric ways; but about 1280 the Bishop of Parma threw him into prison, then kept him awhile in his palace as a source of amusement, and in 1286 banished him from the diocese. All new mendicant orders without papal sanction having been prohibited by the Second Council of Lyon in 1274, Pope Honorius IV issued a severe reprobation of the Apostolic Brethren in 1286, and Nicholas IV renewed it in 1290.

A time of persecution followed. At Parma in 1294 four members of the sect were burned, and Segarelli was condemned to perpetual imprisonment. Six years later he was made to confess a relapse into heresies which he had abjured, and was burned in Parma on July 18, 1300. A man of greater gifts now took the lead of the sect. This was Dolcino, the son of a priest in the diocese of Novara, and a member of the order since 1291, an eloquent, enthusiastic utterer of apocalyptic prophecies.

As the head of the group, who were in daily expectation of seeing the judgment of God on the Church, he maintained in the mountainous districts of Novara and Vercelli a guerilla warfare campaign against the crusaders who had been summoned to put him down. Cold and hunger were still more dangerous enemies; and finally the remnant of his forces were captured by the bishop of Vercelli: about 150 persons in all, including Dolcino himself and his "spiritual sister," Margareta, both of whom, refusing to recant, were burned at the stake on June 1, 1307.

This was really the end of the sect's history. Later, in the middle of the century, traces of their activity are found, especially in northern Italy, Spain, and France, but these were only isolated survivals.

== Ideals ==
The ideal which the Apostolic Brethren strove to realize was a life of perfect sanctity, in complete poverty, with no fixed domicile, no care for the morrow, and no vows. It was a protest against the invasion of the Church by the spirit of worldliness, as well as against the manner in which the other orders kept their vows, particularly that of poverty. In itself the project might have seemed harmless enough, not differing greatly from the way in which other founders had begun. When the order was prohibited, however, the refusal to submit to ecclesiastical authority stamped its members as heretics.

Persecution embittered their opposition; the Church, in their eyes, had fallen completely away from apostolic holiness, and become Babylon the Great, the persecutor of the saints. Their apocalyptic utterances and expectations are a link with the Joachimites; in fact, parallels to their teaching, mostly founded on literal interpretations of Scripture texts, may be found in many non-church bodies. They forbade the taking of oaths, apparently permitting perjury in case of need, and rejected capital punishment; their close intercourse with their "apostolic sisters" gave rise to serious accusations against their morals, though they themselves boasted of their purity, and considered the conquest of temptation so close at hand as especially meritorious.

== Theories ==
The Apostolics did not have a fully developed theory, Segarelli being uneducated. They based their belief on the Acts of the Apostles (2:44-45):

All who believed were together, and had all things in common. They sold their possessions and goods, and distributed them to all, according as anyone had need.

They lived a simple life of fasting and prayer; often they worked to earn enough to eat, otherwise living off charity, preaching, and always invoking penitence.

Their maxim was Poenitentiam agite (make penitence) soon misspelled as Penitençagite! and cited in present days by The Name of the Rose, a novel by Umberto Eco.

== See also ==
- Restorationism
