= William of Baskerville =

Character in the novel The Name of the Rose

- First appearance: The Name of the Rose
- Created by: Umberto Eco
- Portrayed by: Sean Connery (film); John Turturro (miniseries)

In-universe information
- Gender: Male
- Title: Brother
- Occupation: Franciscan friar, former inquisitor
- Nationality: English

William of Baskerville (Italian: Guglielmo da Baskerville, pronounced [ɡuʎˈʎɛlmo dа ˈbaskervil]) is a fictional Franciscan friar from the 1980 historical mystery novel The Name of the Rose (Il nome della rosa) by Umberto Eco.

== Life and death ==
The Name of the Rose is itself a recounting of events as experienced by Adso of Melk, a Benedictine novice (a Franciscan one in the 1986 film adaptation) who travelled under William's protection.

Years before the main events of the novel, as an inquisitor, Brother William presided at several trials in England and Italy, where he distinguished himself by his perspicacity along with great humility. In numerous cases William decided the accused was innocent. In one of his most consequential cases, William refused to condemn a man on charges of heresy, despite the demands of the inquisitor Bernardo Gui. The accusations of heresy stemmed from the man's translation of a Greek book that contradicted the scriptures. Despite his appeals to the Pope, William was imprisoned and tortured until he recanted, in turn leading to the translator's death by burning at the stake. Though he departed from his role as an inquisitor, his torture and the death of the accused remain fresh in his mind.

In 1327, William and Adso travel to a Benedictine monastery in Northern Italy to attend a theological disputation between the Franciscans and Papal emissaries on the poverty of Christ. This abbey is being used as an embassy between Pope John XXII, and the Friars Minor, who are suspected of heresy.

The abbey boasts a famed scriptorium where scribes copy, translate or illuminate books. After a string of unexpected deaths the abbot seeks help from William, who is renowned for his deductive powers, to investigate the deaths. William is reluctantly drawn in by the intellectual challenge and his desire to disprove fears of a demonic culprit. William also worries the abbot will summon officials of the Inquisition should the mystery remain unsolved.

Following the events of The Name of the Rose, Adso and William part ways, with Adso relating the tale before his death. We are informed near the end of the book that William later died during a plague in Europe.

== Name and allusion ==
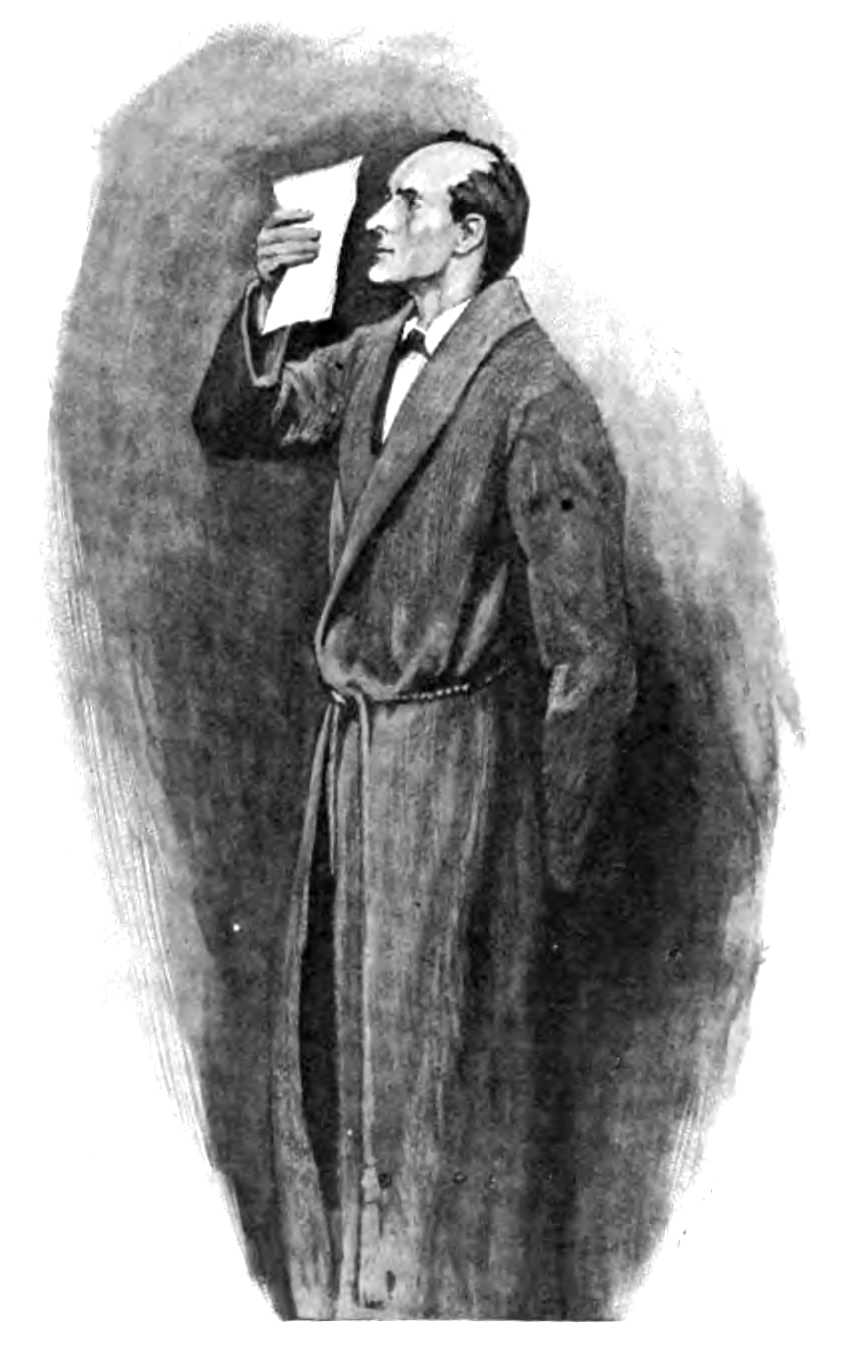
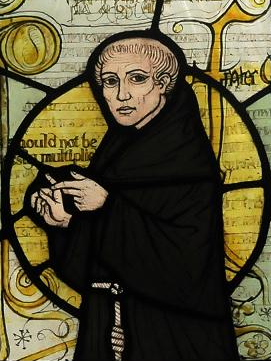
William of Baskerville alludes both to the fictional Sherlock Holmes and the 14th century English Franciscan friar and scholastic philosopher and theologian William of Ockham.

The fictional friar, William of Baskerville, alludes both to the fictional sleuth Sherlock Holmes and to William of Ockham. The name itself is derived from William of Ockham and Sir Arthur Conan Doyle's book The Hound of the Baskervilles. Another view is that Eco has created Brother William as a combination of Roger Bacon, William of Ockham and Sherlock Holmes. (William himself notes that Bacon was a mentor of his and cites his ideas several times in the course of the book.)

William of Ockham, who lived during the time of the novel, first put forward the principle known as "Ockham's Razor", which is often summarised as the dictum that one should always accept as most likely the simplest explanation that accounts for all the facts. William applies this dictum in a manner analogous to the way Sherlock Holmes applies his similar dictum, that when one has eliminated the impossible, whatever remains — however improbable — must be the truth.

== Characteristics ==
In the book, The Name of the Rose, Umberto Eco's description of Brother William of Baskerville has some similarities to Arthur Conan Doyle's description of Sherlock Holmes in A Study in Scarlet (1887).

=== Appearance ===
Sherlock Holmes	William of Baskerville
In height he was rather over six feet, and so excessively lean that he seemed to be considerably taller. His eyes were sharp and piercing, save during those intervals of torpor to which I have alluded; and his thin, hawk-like nose gave his whole expression an air of alertness and decision. His chin, too, had the prominence and squareness which mark the man of determination.	His height surpassed that of a normal man and he was so thin that he seemed still taller. His eyes were sharp and penetrating; his thin and slightly beaky nose gave his countenance the expression of man on the lookout, save in certain moments of sluggishness of which I shall speak. His chin also denoted a firm will, though the long face covered with freckles could occasionally express hesitation and puzzlement.

However, William has blond eyebrows and yellowish hair clumps growing from his ears.

Eco seems to suggest that William may be a direct ancestor of Sherlock Holmes, having possibly fathered a child in a youthful romance. While William is taking Adso's confession, William says, '"Indeed, rather than reflect and dwell too much on something best forgotten, if possible," - and it seemed to me at this point that his voice faded as if at some private emotion - "let us ask ourselves the meaning of what happened this night."'

=== Behavior ===
William of Baskerville's behavioral characteristics, as relayed through William's novice, Adso of Melk, also displays similarities to Sherlock Holmes' as characterized by Dr. Watson.

Sherlock Holmes	William of Baskerville
Nothing could exceed his energy when the working fit was upon him; but now and again a reaction would seize him, and for days on end he would lie upon the sofa in the sitting-room, hardly uttering a word or moving a muscle from morning to night. On these occasions I have noticed such a dreamy, vacant expression in his eyes, that I might have suspected him of being addicted to the use of some narcotic, had not the temperance and cleanliness of his whole life forbidden such a notion.	His energy seemed inexhaustible when a burst of activity overwhelmed him. But from time to time [...] he moved backwards in moments of inertia, and I watched him lie for hours on my pallet in my cell, uttering barely a few monosyllables, without contracting a single muscle of his face. On those occasions a vacant, absent expression appeared in his eyes, and I would have suspected he was in the power of some vegetal substance capable of producing visions if the obvious temperance of his life had not led me to reject the thought.

Sherlock Holmes' use of cocaine is also similar to Brother William's use of a mysterious herb. The book explains that Brother William used to collect some herb that has a mentally stimulating effect, but it does not seem narcotic. "He sometimes stopped at the edge of a meadow, at the entrance to a forest, to gather some herb [...] and he would then chew it with an absorbed look. He kept some of it with him, and ate it in the moments of great tension".

== Portrayals in adaptations ==
Sean Connery portrayed William of Baskerville in the 1986 film adaptation The Name of the Rose. John Turturro portrayed William of Baskerville in the 2019 miniseries The Name of the Rose.

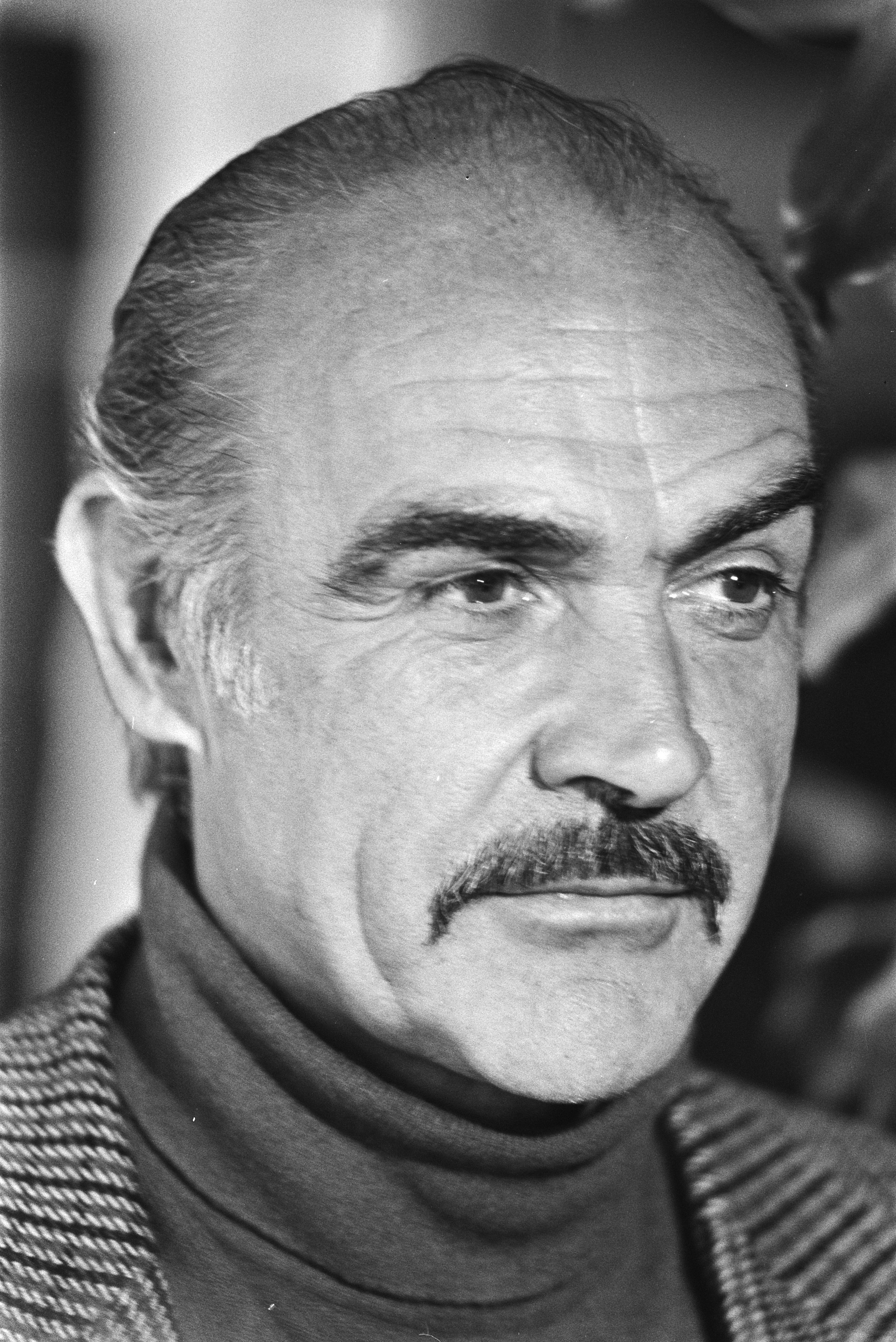
Sean Connery, here depicted in November 1983, portrayed William of Baskerville in the 1986 film adaptation The Name of the Rose.

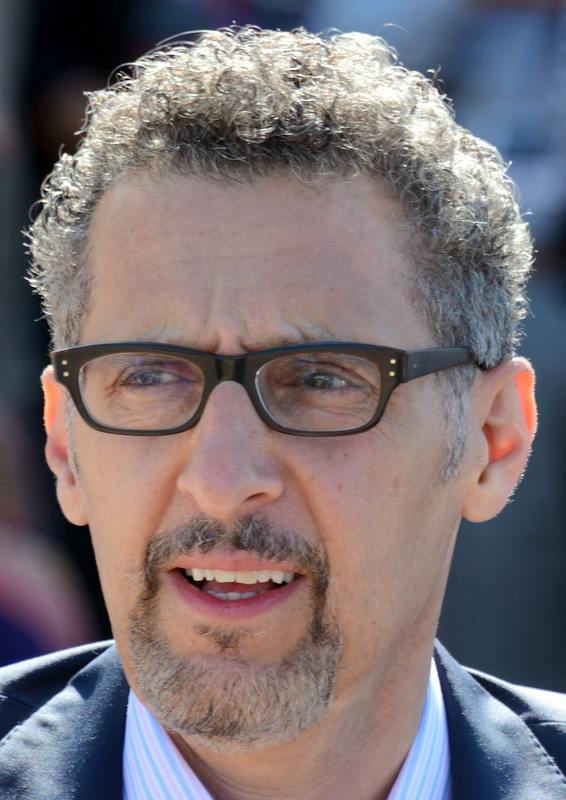
John Turturro portrayed William of Baskerville in the 2019 miniseries The Name of the Rose.
