= Uzo (filmmaker) =

- Born: August 1957 (age 69); Obiaruku, Nigeria
- Occupations: Film director, artist

Uzo (born August 1957) is a Nigerian-American filmmaker and graphic artist. He has made two feature films, Walls & Bridges (1992) and Better Than Ever (1997). After losing the option to the film rights on the novel Mendel's Dwarf, after many years of work, he is currently working on a third film, Sophie's Wish.

== Early life ==
He is Igbo and was born in Obiaruku town, Delta State, located in the south-south region of Nigeria. Uzo is the son of a bookseller and a midwife. His mother died during childbirth when he was twelve years old due to poor medical attention due to the expenditure of resources on the Biafran War, after which he and his two siblings were raised solely by his father. He studied graphic design at the University of Nigeria, Nsukka (UNN) in Enugu State, southeastern Nigeria, then a master's program in graphic design, at Howard University, Washington, D.C., and then photography at Brooks Institute of Photography, Santa Barbara, California. His early interest in film was cultivated primarily by films from India, today's Bollywood, that were popular in Nigeria during his youth.

== Career ==
His production company is called Cold Grey Entertainment. Initially based in Patchogue, New York, he is now based in Jamaica, Queens, New York City, New York.

A professional graphic artist, he is the founder of the Devo clothing brand, which has now been phased into a shoe line. While his films deal significantly with race relations, the issue of race is never dealt with on the surface.

Uzo does not consider himself much of a writer, and each of his films has been co-written with someone else based on his initial concepts. After writing and rewriting the script, for Walls & Bridges, he hired Michael Edelson, then a film professor at SUNY Stony Brook, and Barbara Gallen as story consultants. He co-wrote the finished screenplay with Alyssa McGuinness. Uzo, Alan Fine, and co-producer Anthony Breccia co-wrote Better Than Ever based on his story, and he had another writer on Mendel's Dwarf, again after agonizing on several drafts of the scripts of his own. Most recently, he has consulted with Kimberly Britt to script his third film, titled Sophie's Wish. Uzo prefers to keep his films simple, straightforward, and unmanipulative, "in the European style."

=== Works ===
Uzo's Walls & Bridges is the story of a white nun Ellen Landress Bowkett who leaves her Order to marry a black painter Mark D. Kennerly who is blinded in a random act of violence. While developing the script, Uzo spent two years painting the large size Miro-esque murals featured in the film. The film premiered October 14, 1992, at the John F. Kennedy Center for the Performing Arts Washington, DC. It was one of two films representing the United States at the Sixth Festival of the Americas, sponsored by the Organization of American States and the American Film Institute. He is considered the first African-born person to direct an American feature film.

Uzo's second film, shot under the title Cul-de-Sac, was released by Water Bearer Films in a shortened version under the title Better Than Ever, presumably to avoid confusion with the cult classic by Roman Polanski. Described as Grumpy Old Men meets Home Alone, the film stars Academy Award Nominee William Hickey, Carl Gordon, Victor Colicchio, Frank Gorshin, Donald McDonald, Sylva Gassel, Irma St. Paule, Pee Wee Love, Neil Ruddy, and the acting debut of Joey Buttafuoco.

He optioned the film rights and struggled for years on an adaptation of Simon Mawer's 1999 novel, Mendel's Dwarf. After years of languishing in what he calls, "Hollywood's development hell", the option elapsed and was subsequently sold to Barbra Streisand's company.

== Personal life ==
Uzo was married to a white Long Island native from Wading River in the 1980s and divorced in 1990s; he has two daughters, Tyne and Anya.

== See also ==
- List of Nigerian film producers

== Notes ==
- Longsdorf, Amy. "Dodging Walls, Crossing Bridges: Uzo Perseveres In Making First Film". The Morning Call. April 3, 1994.
