= Margaret of Trent =

Companion of Fra Dolcino of Novara (d. 1307)

Margaret of Trent (died 1 June 1307) was the companion of Fra Dolcino of Novara, leader of the heretical New Apostles, from at least December 1303 until her death. She was a native of Trent or possibly Arco.

In a deposition taken in Bologna on 22 September 1304, Rolandino, one of the Apostles, described Margaret as from Trent and a companion of Dolcino for the past year. In 1302–1303, according to Rolandino, Dolcino had been accompanied on his preaching tour of the Trentino by Cara da Modena, a woman and fellow preacher. In Dolcino's second letter of December 1303, however, he lists the leaders of his movement in order of precedence with himself first as rector (leader) and his sister Margaret second as "his beloved above all". They are followed by the brothers Longino da Bergamo, Alberto da Cimego, Baldrico da Brescia and Federico Grampa di Novara. The same hierarchy is described as current by Rolandino in his deposition.

Margaret's rise to prominence appears to have been rapid, given the presence of another woman, Cara, beside Dolcino earlier in the year. It is not known if the choice of a woman as his companion had significance to the movement or was merely coincidental. No other women leaders are known among the Apostles. In his writings, the inquisitor Bernard Gui accuses Margaret of being Dolcino's concubine (amasia), but his accusation is of little worth on its own. He also calls Margaret "his partner in crime and heresy" and a "mischievous woman". He admits that Dolcino denies any physical relationship, claiming that he treated Margaret "in the manner of a sister in Christ, modestly and honestly". According to Gui, when Margaret became pregnant Dolcino claimed that she was impregnated by the Holy Spirit. Gui heightens the implausibility of Dolcino's claim by describing Margaret, in Italian in an otherwise Latin text, as "the beauty" (la bella), a description picked up by the anonymous Historia fratris Dulcini and by Benvenuto da Imola, who writes of her "immense beauty".

In 1306, Pope Clement V declared a crusade against the followers of Fra Dolcino, who took refuge in the Val Sesia. On 23 March 1307, Raniero Avogadro, bishop of Vercelli, led the final attack on the New Apostles. Dolcino, Margaret and Longino were captured. They were brought to Biella on 25 March. After a secular trial by a council of wise men, according to the Historia fratris Dulcini, they were burned at the stake on the banks of the Cervo near Vercelli on 1 June 1307. Margaret was burned first before Dolcino's eyes. Gui gives a slightly different account. He has Margaret torn to pieces before Dolcino's eyes before the latter met the same fate. Their dismembered corpses were then cremated.

On 31 December 1332, Margaret's brother Boninsegna, son of Oddorico da Arco, a nobleman, testified that about 28 years earlier his sister and four other young women along with several young men had joined the New Apostles and died at the stake. But two years earlier, according to Boninsegna, he had learned that she was alive and living in Vicenza under the name Maria. She had been imprisoned for three years, released by the Inquisition, married and had a fifteen-year-old son. There is no other source that mentions Margaret's survival and it is likely that the story of her escape was concocted to posthumously rehabilitate her.

== Bibliography ==
- Benedetti, Marina (2008). "Margherita da Trento". Dizionario Biografico degli Italiani (in Italian). Vol. 70: Marcora–Marsilio. Rome: Istituto dell'Enciclopedia Italiana. ISBN 978-88-12-00032-6.
