= Fra Dolcino =

Italian preacher (1250–1307)

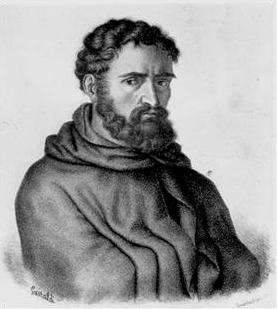
Fra Dolcino

Fra Dolcino (c. 1250 – 1307) was the second leader of the Dulcinian reformist movement who was burned at the stake in Northern Italy in 1307. He had taken over the movement after its founder, Gerard Segarelli, had also been executed in 1300 on the orders of the Roman Catholic Church. Although the beliefs and spirituality of the Dulcinian sect were inspired by the teachings of Francis of Assisi, who had founded the Franciscan Order in 1210, their beliefs were condemned as heresy by the Catholic Church. The Papacy condemned their practices of poverty, liberty, and opposition to the feudal system.

== Real name ==
The origins of Fra Dolcino and his real name are a subject of constant debate among historians. One view is that he belonged to the wealthy Tornielli family of Novara, while another view is that he was the illegitimate son of a priest who fled from Vercelli to escape punishment for some small burglaries.

Recent research by Raniero Orioli presents a theory: the paper of the Anonymous Synchronous (an "anonymous contemporary") written shortly after the facts, identifies him as nomine Dulcinus, filius presbyteri Iulii de Tarecontano Vallis Ossole diocesis Novariensis (by name Dulcinus, son of presbyter Julius from Tarecontano of the Ossola Valley in the diocese of Novara); a few years later the inquisitor Bernardo Gui in his work on heretical sects reports the same information changing the word presbyteri to sacerdotis (priest) thus concluding that he was the illegitimate son of a priest. The research of Orioli shows that De Julio Presbitero was actually the name of a wealthy family of Vercelli belonging to the Ghibellines, who often married members of the Tornielli family of nearby Novara (Romagnano Sesia), also Ghibellines, so he proposes that Dolcino could be the son of a couple that united members of both families.

== History ==
Benvenuto da Imola in his commentaries written less than a century after the fact tells us that Dolcino was born in Romagnano Sesia, went in his childhood to Vercelli and there lived in the church of St. Agnes where he studied grammar. He was very intelligent and proficient in the studies, of short stature, always smiling and of gentle temperament. One day a priest lamented that some money had been stolen and accused one of his familiars, Patras, of the theft; he in turn accused Dolcino and wanted him tortured to make him confess. The priests refused and did not accuse him of anything but Dolcino was terrorized and fled far away to the city of Trento where he met and joined the sect of the Apostolics. Dolcino left Vercelli between 1280 and 1290 and the research of Orioli shows that in the same period, the fights between Guelphs and Ghibellines caused many victims on both sides in the city; the fear of being involved in these fights could better explain his decision to leave and join the initially pacifist movement of Segarelli. The inquisitor Bernardo Gui cites the same episode, concluding that he fled to Trento to escape the just punishment for his burglaries.

Fra Dolcino, a former member, became in 1300 the leader of the movement of Apostolics, and influenced by the millenarist theories of Gioacchino da Fiore gave birth to the Dulcinian movement, which existed between the years 1300 and 1307. It ended in the mountains in Sesia Valley and in the Biella area, in Piedmont, Italy, on 23 March 1307 when many crusaders (multi crucesignati) finally conquered the fortification built on the mount Rubello by the Dulcinians.

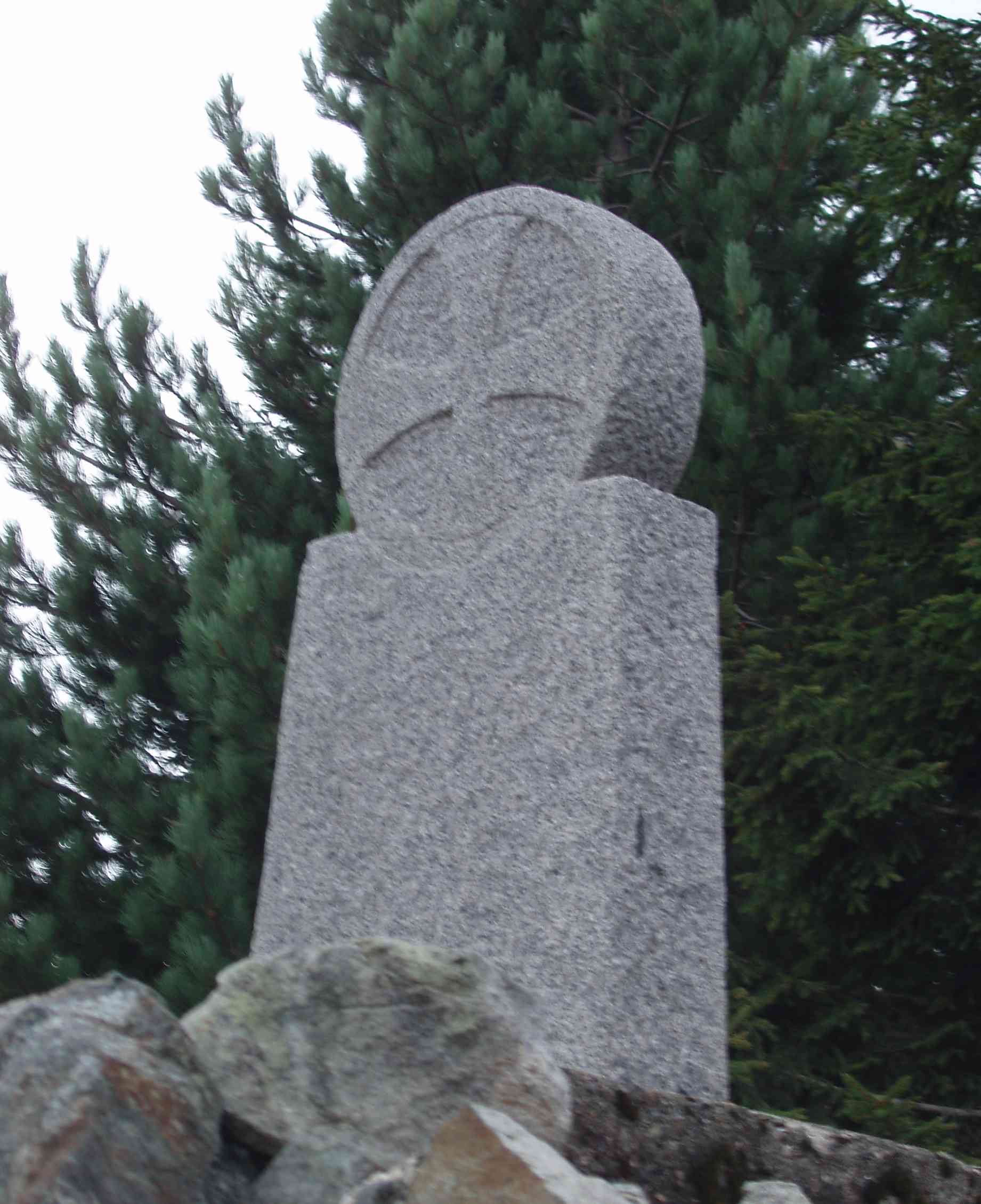
1974 Frà Dolcino memorial stone on Monte Rubello

According to the Roman Catholic Church and most historians of the period, Dolcino and his followers, in reaction to attacks by Catholic troops, became criminals (today they would probably be called guerrilla fighters), who would not hesitate, for their own survival, to plunder and devastate villages, killing any who opposed them, and burning their houses. He justified the actions committed by his followers in this period citing words attributed to Saint Paul in the Epistle to Titus (1:15): "To the pure all things are pure, but to the corrupt and unbelieving nothing is pure; their very minds and consciences are corrupted", as reported by the Anonymous Synchronous Dolcino maintained: "[...] that it was legitimate for him and his followers to hang, behead, [...] people who obey to the Roman church and burn down, destroy, [...] because they were acting to redeem them and thus without sin".

Despite this, he was considered by some to be one of the reformers of the Church and one of the founders of the ideals of the French Revolution and socialism. In particular he was positively reevaluated toward the end of the 19th century and was dubbed the Apostle of the Socialist Jesus and thus in 1907 left wing workers of Biella and the Sesia Valley erected a monument on mount Rubello, the place of its last resistance. The monument was later (1927) symbolically gunned down by the Fascists and rebuilt in a smaller size and different shape in 1974.

== Execution ==
Fra Dolcino and his co-preacher or concubine Margaret of Trent were never tried by the Church. Manly Hall claims (as do many other modern writers) that Dolcino was castrated and torn to pieces, limb by limb, the pieces afterwards burned by the public executioner. This is apparently not based on any contemporary or near contemporary account of Fra Dolcino's execution. Fifteen years later (in 1322), approximately thirty of Dolcino's disciples were burned alive in the marketplace at Padua. After his capture the Bishop of Vercelli consulted with the Inquisition and other eminent people to decide on an immediate execution (in fact the acts of the trial were never found, despite some suggestions that they could be hidden somewhere in the secret archives of the Vatican) so the paper of the Anonymous Synchronous, probably written by a follower or a local sympathizer of the Dulcinian, the one of Bernardo Gui and another anonymous paper (probably also written by Bernardo Gui) are the only documents we have that were written in the same period the events took place.

== Ideas ==
He was considered to have been an intelligent, erudite and charismatic speaker. He expressed his ideas in a series of letters he wrote to the Apostolics from 1300 to 1307; his letters were found by the Inquisition and are deeply analyzed (and confuted) in the paper "Additamentum ad Historiam fratris Dulcini, haeretici", written by an Inquisitor.

== Cultural references ==
In Dante's Divine Comedy, actually written after Fra Dolcino's death but as if it were before it, Mohammed talks about Dolcino (Inferno XXVIII):

Then you, who will perhaps soon see the sun,

tell Fra Dolcino to provide himself
with food, if he has no desire to join me
here quickly, lest when the snow besieges him,
it brings the Novarese the victory

that otherwise they would not find too easy

Fra Dolcino and his former followers are mentioned often in Umberto Eco's novel The Name of the Rose. The dialogue between the narrator Adso and the old priest Ubertino recounts the story of Fra Dolcino in outline, leaving much to the imagination of the reader. Bernardo Gui also figures in the novel, as do Dolcino's papers.

In On Liberty, John Stuart Mill uses Fra Dolcino as an example of the inability of truth to triumph over persecution.

Dario Fo's Mistero Buffo includes an episode that recounts the story of Fra Dolcino's rebellion.

== Bibliography ==
- Anonymous Synchronous, "Historia Fratris Dulcini Heresiarche Novariensis ab A.C. 1304 usque ad A. 1307"
- Bernardo Gui, "De secta illorum qui se dicunt esse de ordine apostolorum"
- "Additamentum ad Historiam fratris Dulcini, haeretici" ab auctore coevo scriptum
- Muratori L., "Raccolta degli Storici Italiani dal 500 al 1500", collects the previous 3 documents, book IX, part V, Città di Castello, C.E.S. Lapi, 1907.
- Benvenuto da Imola, Comentum super Dantis Aldigherij comoediam, Inferno 28,55–60, 3. Edition (1375) (searchable online at dante.dartmouth.edu
- Johann Lorenz von Mosheim "Geschichte des Apostel-Ordens in dreien Büchern" in "Versuch eines unparteischen und gründlichen Ketzergeschichte", Helmstaedt 1748.
- Mariotti L. (Antonio Gallenga), "Historical memoir of Fra Dolcino and his times", Brown, London 1853, pp.XII-376.
- Orioli Raniero, "Venit perfidus heresiarca. Il movimento apostolico-dolciniano dal 1260 al 1307", Roma 1988.
- Berkhout, Carl T. and Jeffrey B. Russell. "Medieval heresies: a bibliography, 1960–1979." in Subsidia mediaevalia, 11. Toronto: Pontifical Institute of Mediaeval Studies, 1981 (entries Apostolici, Dolcino, Margaret, Segarelli)
- Jerry B. Pierce, "Apocalyptic Poverty: Gerard Segarelli, Fra Dolcino and the Legitimization of Deviance among the Order of Apostles, 1260–1307"
- Antonio Labriola, "Socialism and Philosophy" (HTML at marxists.org), Chapter IX, 1897
