= Hugh of Newcastle =

Hugh of Newcastle (died 1322, buried in Paris) was a Franciscan theologian and scholastic philosopher, a pupil of Duns Scotus. His origin in Newcastle-upon-Tyne is questioned; he may have been from another place called Neufchâtel.

== Works ==
He wrote a commentary on the Sentences of Peter Lombard. He was also author of a prophetic work De Victoria Christi contra Antichristum, from 1319, encyclopedic on the Apocalypse and its signs, printed in 1471.

== In literature ==
Hugh is a character in The Name of the Rose by Umberto Eco.
