= Apostolic poverty =

Christian doctrine adopted by some Orders

Apostolic poverty is a Christian doctrine that states that members of the clergy should live without ownership of lands or accumulation of money, following the precepts given to the seventy disciples in the Gospel of Luke (10:1-24). It was notably professed in the thirteenth century by the newly formed mendicant orders in response to calls for reform in the Roman Catholic Church.

This provocative doctrine challenged the wealth of the Church, which reformers saw as corrupting and contrary to Christ's absolute poverty. Although apostolic poverty was eventually condemned as heretical by Pope John XXII in 1323, the belief was controversial and found sympathetic audiences among the disaffected poor of the 12th, 13th, and 14th centuries.

The debate on apostolic poverty is one of the main themes of Umberto Eco's 1980 novel The Name of the Rose, which is set in 1327 amid renewed controversy on the question and the persecution of radical Franciscans.

== History ==
=== Investiture controversy ===
The ascetic Pope Paschal II's solution of the Investiture Controversy in his radical Concordat of 1111, repudiated by the cardinals, was that the ecclesiastics of Germany should surrender to the imperial crown their fiefs and secular offices.

=== Apostolic Brethren ===
In Northern Italy, Spain, and France primarily, a religious movement of people called the Apostolic Brethren was a large advocate of this idea. The word "Apostolic" used to describe members of the Brethren was also used as a label for people from similar religious sects.

=== Humiliati ===
The Humiliati, also known as the "Humble Ones", were a major proponent of apostolic poverty. Founded by a wool merchant, they established communities scattered around Italy and France, organized on the principle of a simple way of life for the laity, who shared their goods while remaining in family units. They remained primarily a lay movement, and came to reject the authority of the hierarchy and the clergy. For this and other reasons, they were later to be declared heretical by the Catholic Church.

It is often assumed that Saint Francis of Assisi was inspired to form the Franciscans by their movement, in an effort to emulate the poverty of Jesus Christ and to bring his message through a simple life and example, while strictly adhering to the beliefs of the Catholic Church. Saint Dominic founded a similar order, the Order of Preachers, better known as the Dominicans.

=== Waldensians ===
Sometime during the 1170's, a wealthy cloth merchant known as Waldes or Peter Waldo experienced a religious conversion, which some have attributed to a minstrel he heard tell the story of St. Alexis. After hearing this recital, Waldes visited a master theologian in order to determine the surest way to salvation, to which the theologian replied he should follow the scripture; specifically Matthew 19:21: 'If you wish to go the whole way, then go and sell everything you have, and give to the poor'. Waldes then, after providing for his family, gave away all of his possessions and followed a life of apostolic poverty. He had the Gospel translated and began openly preaching, gaining followers who also embraced lives of apostolic poverty; these men and women became known as the Waldensians. Walter Map, though critical of the Waldensians' lack of education and therefore their inability to preach, conceded that they did truly live in a state of poverty comparable to the apostles, describing them as having 'no permanent homes...possessing nothing and having everything in common like the Apostles, naked, following a naked Christ'.

By the early 1200s, Waldensians were being persecuted by the Catholic Church and were officially deemed heretics at the Fourth Lateran Council in 1215.

=== Franciscans ===
The doctrine of the absolute poverty of Christ was a teaching associated with the Franciscan order of friars, particularly prominent between 1210 and 1323. The key tenet of the doctrine of absolute poverty was that Christ and the apostles had no property, whether individually or shared. Debate about the doctrine came to a head in what is known as the theoretical poverty controversy in 1322–23.

Early Franciscans were itinerant preachers, who, following their founder Francis of Assisi, took to heart the injunction in Luke 9:3 to "Take nothing for the journey, neither walking stick, nor sack, nor food, nor money, and let no one take a second tunic." The mendicant practice of begging for alms, itself, caused some hard feelings, both on the part of monastic orders sometimes dependent on the same donors, and the donors themselves when faced with repeated appeals from local friars in lieu of more distant potential benefactors.

Over time, as the order grew, it faced the demands of caring for sick or elderly friars, and providing for those sent to university for theological training. One method to deal with this was a legal construct whereby gifts would be placed in the name of a patron, held in trust for the friars' use. In this way, they need not be perennially destitute. The "Spirituals" felt that this abrogated the spirit of the founder, and believed a restricted use of property was more in keeping with the rule. A lengthy theological discussion then ensued as to what was intended and required by the Rule.

The Franciscans were authorized by Pope Gregory IX to have non-members who would look after their material needs, while the friars themselves would own nothing and would only make use according to the vow of poverty of what was given to them. From the beginning, two tendencies developed. Some friars, referred to as the Zelanti, living more isolated and simpler lives, strictly observed the poverty enjoined by the testament of Saint Francis. Others lived in convents in the towns, tending the attached churches with the necessary liturgical furnishings and devoting themselves also to study and preaching, which required the use of books. They observed the Franciscan Rule in accordance with interpretations officially made by the Popes. Already Gregory IX had indicated that the testament of St Francis did not oblige the friars in conscience. Pope Innocent IV gave the Franciscans permission to appoint "procurators" to buy, sell and administer goods given to them. Bonaventure, who become minister general in 1257, tried to reconcile the two tendencies and is sometimes called the second founder of the Order, to which he gave its first General Constitutions. Conflicts with the secular clergy and with lay teachers in the universities led to accusations of hypocrisy with regard to the profession of poverty from outsiders, as well as from those members of the order formerly known as the Zelanti, but who then began to be referred to as the Spirituals, because of their association with the Age of the Spirit that the apocalyptic writer Joachim of Fiore had foretold would begin in 1260.

In the early years of the 14th century, the conflict between the Spirituals and the Conventual Franciscans came to a head. The Spirituals, who in the 13th century were led by the Joachimist Peter Olivi, adopted more extreme positions that discredited the notion of apostolic poverty in some eyes and led to condemnation by Pope John XXII.

In his 14 August 1279 bull Exiit qui seminat, Pope Nicholas III had confirmed the arrangement already established by Pope Gregory IX, by which all property given to the Franciscans was vested in the Holy See, which granted the friars the mere use of it. The bull declared that renunciation of ownership of all things "both individually but also in common, for God's sake, is meritorious and holy; Christ, also, showing the way of perfection, taught it by word and confirmed it by example, and the first founders of the Church militant, as they had drawn it from the fountainhead itself, distributed it through the channels of their teaching and life to those wishing to live perfectly". Pope Clement V's bull Exivi de Paradiso of 20 November 1312 failed to effect a compromise between the two factions. Clement V's successor, Pope John XXII was determined to suppress what he considered to be the excesses of the Spirituals, who contended eagerly for the view that Christ and his apostles had possessed absolutely nothing, either separately or jointly, and who were citing Exiit qui seminat in support of their view. In 1317, he formally condemned the group of them known as the Fraticelli.

On 26 March 1322, John removed the ban on discussion of Nicholas III's bull and commissioned experts to examine the idea of poverty based on belief that Christ and the apostles owned nothing. The experts disagreed among themselves, but the majority condemned the idea on the grounds that it would condemn the Church's right to have possessions. The Franciscan chapter held in Perugia in May 1322 declared on the contrary: "To say or assert that Christ, in showing the way of perfection, and the Apostles, in following that way and setting an example to others who wished to lead the perfect life, possessed nothing either severally or in common, either by right of ownership and dominium or by personal right, we corporately and unanimously declare to be not heretical, but true and catholic." By the bull Ad conditorem canonum of 8 December of the same year, John XXII, declaring that "it was ridiculous to pretend that every egg and piece of bread given to and eaten by the Friars Minor belonged to the pope", forced them to accept ownership by ending the arrangement according to which all property given to the Franciscans was vested in the Holy See, which granted the friars the mere use of it. He thus demolished the fictitious structure that gave the appearance of absolute poverty to the life of the Franciscan friars, a structure that "absolved the Franciscans from the moral burden of legal ownership, and enabled them to practise apostolic poverty without the inconvenience of actual poverty". And on 12 November 1323 he issued the short bull Cum inter nonnullos, which declared "erroneous and heretical" the doctrine that Christ and his apostles had no possessions whatever.

Influential members of the order protested, including the minister general Michael of Cesena, William of Ockham, and Bonagratia of Bergamo. In 1324, Louis the Bavarian sided with the Spirituals and accused the Pope of heresy. In reply to the argument of his opponents that Nicholas III's bull Exiit qui seminat was fixed and irrevocable, John XXII issued the bull Quia quorundam of 10 November 1324, in which he declared that it cannot be inferred from the words of the 1279 bull that Christ and the apostles had nothing, adding: "Indeed, it can be inferred rather that the Gospel life lived by Christ and the Apostles did not exclude some possessions in common, since living 'without property' does not require that those living thus should have nothing in common."

In 1328 Michael of Cesena was summoned to Avignon to explain the Order's intransigence in refusing the Pope's orders and its complicity with Louis of Bavaria. Michael was imprisoned in Avignon, together with Francesco d'Ascoli, Bonagratia and William of Ockham. In January of that year Louis of Bavaria entered Rome and had himself crowned emperor. Three months later, he declared John XXII deposed and installed the Spiritual Franciscan Pietro Rainalducci as Pope. The Franciscan chapter that opened in Bologna on 28 May reelected Michael of Cesena, who two days before had escaped with his companions from Avignon. But in August Louis the Bavarian and his pope had to flee Rome before an attack by Robert, King of Naples. Only a small part of the Franciscan Order joined the opponents of John XXII, and at a general chapter held in Paris in 1329 the majority of all the houses declared their submission to the Pope. With the bull "Quia vir reprobus" of 16 November 1329, John XXII replied to Michael of Cesena's attacks on Ad conditorem canonum, Cum inter and Quia quorundam. In 1330 Antipope Nicholas V submitted, followed later by the ex-general Michael, and finally, just before his death, by Ockham.

== See also ==
- Christian views on poverty and wealth
- Corporate poverty – Refusal to own property, individually or corporately
- Imitation of Christ
- Medieval Restorationism
- Mendicant orders
- The novel The Name of the Rose features a debate about the topic.
