= Gerard Segarelli =

Founder of the Apostolic Brethren

Gerard or Gherardo or Gherardino Segarelli or Segalelli (around 1240 - July 18, 1300) was the founder of the Apostolic Brethren (in Latin Apostolici). He was burned at the stake in 1300.

== Sources ==
In the 1280s, Salimbene di Adam wrote an account of Segarelli and the Brethren. While contemporary and detailed, scholars note the Franciscan's bias against the upstart group attempting to imitate the Franciscan idea of poverty. This account would later be the basis of the libretto for Ildebrando Pizzetti's opera Fra Gherardo.

== Biography ==
Gerard was born at Segalara near Parma. As a youth he applied for admission to a Franciscan monastery in Parma but was apparently refused because, according to Salimbene, he was ignorant, foolish, illiterate, and low-born. Nevertheless, he remained around the monastery for some time, often visiting the convent and the church to sit or kneel before the altar. Influenced perhaps by a representation over the altar of the twelve Apostles, Segarelli allowed his beard and hair to grow, and wore a coarse grey robe with a white mantle in imitation of the apostles.

In 1260, in accord with Matthew 19: 21 ("If you wish to be perfect, go, sell what you have and give to [the] poor...”), Gerard sold his possessions and went to the market of Parma and distributed his earnings. Segarelli wandered about the streets calling the people to repentance (penitentiam agite).

He continued this activity for three years until one "Robert"—who had been a servant of the Franciscans—joined him; before the end of that year about thirty more individuals had joined them. Segarelli started preaching in other cities and the number of his followers grew, drawn from among the poor. After some initial hesitation he agreed to be elected their leader. The group walked about the streets chanting hymns, preached to those who would listen and ate what the people gave to them, sharing it with the poor.

The movement eventually spread not only throughout Lombardy but also Germany, France, Spain, and England. Some Apostles were traduced at a council in Würzburg and a decree was issued which forbade them to preach and beg and the people were warned against encouraging them by giving food or water. Other Apostles were proscribed in England at a council at Chichester in 1289; it is not certain if these sects were directly connected to that of Segarelli, there are however many analogies between them.

At a later point in 1300 followers of the Apostles were found in Spain where one Richard of Alexandria was successful in his preaching, particularly in Galicia. In 1320, Peter of Lugo — an Apostle follower of Richard — was brought before the Inquisition in Toulouse.

It was in Lombardy where the disciples of Segarelli had great success and started to attract enemies. The bishop of Parma was informed in 1280 that Segarelli was directing invectives against the Church so he had him apprehended immediately. After examination the authorities concluded that he was a poor, demented visionary and released him.

In 1286 however, probably pressed by the Inquisition, the Bishop banned him from the city. It appears that he broke the ban in 1294, returning clandestinely to his hometown. He was again brought before the Bishop, abjured and condemned to perpetual imprisonment while four of his followers were burnt alive. It is not clear why, but in 1300 he was interrogated again by the Grand Inquisitor of Parma: found guilty of relapsing into errors formerly abjured, he was thus burnt at the stake.

== See also ==
- Fra Dolcino

== Sources ==
- Johann Lorenz von Mosheim "Geschichte des Apostel-Ordens in dreien Büchern" in Versuch eines unparteischen und gründlichen Ketzergeschichte, Helmstaedt 1748.
- Mariotti L. (Antonio Gallenga), Historical memoir of Fra Dolcino and his times, Brown, London 1853, pp. 85–118.
- Berkhout, Carl T. and Jeffrey B. Russell. "Apostolici"; "Segarelli," in Medieval heresies: a bibliography, 1960-1979, Toronto: Pontifical Institute of Mediaeval Studies, 1981 (Subsidia mediaevalia, 11).
- Giancarlo Andenna, "Il carisma negato: Gerardo Segarelli," in Giancarlo Andenna / Mirko Breitenstein / Gert Melville (Hgg.): Charisma und religiöse Gemeinschaften im Mittelalter. Akten des 3. Internationalen Kongresses des "Italienisch-deutschen Zentrums für Vergleichende Ordensgeschichte". Münster / Hamburg / Berlin / London: LIT 2005 (Vita regularis. Ordnungen und Deutungen religiosen Lebens im Mittelalter, 26), 415–442.
