= Dulcinians =

Religious sect of the Late Middle Ages

The Dulcinians were a religious sect of the Late Middle Ages, originating within the Apostolic Brethren. The Dulcinians, or Dulcinites, and Apostolic Brethren were inspired by Franciscan ideals and influenced by the Joachimites but were considered heretical by the Catholic Church. Their name derives from the movement's leader, Fra Dolcino of Novara (c. 1250–1307), who was burned as a heretic on the orders of Pope Clement V.

== History ==
The Dulcinian sect began in 1300 when Gherardo Segarelli, founder of the Apostolic Brethren, was burned at the stake in Parma during a brutal repression of the Apostolics. His followers went into hiding to save their lives. Fra Dolcino had joined the Apostolics between 1288 and 1292 and became their leader. He published the first of his letters explaining his ideas about the epochs of history based on the theories of Gioacchino da Fiore.

At the beginning of 1303, Dolcino reunited the Apostolic movement near Lake Garda. He met Margaret of Trent (his lover or sister in spirit) and wrote the second letter to the Apostolics. At the beginning of 1304, three Dulcinians were burned by the Inquisition, leading Dolcino to evacuate the community to the west side of the Sesia valley, near his native Novara. At the end of 1304, only 1,400 survived on the top of Mount Parete Calva, in the fortified Piano dei Gazzari. They descended the mountain to pillage and kill the people in the valley, responsible in their eyes for not defending the group against the episcopal troops. The villagers called them "Gazzari" (Cathars), and joined the soldiers in opposition.

Dolcino justified the acts committed by the Dulcinians by affirming their perfection and holiness based on a passage from the Epistle to Titus, which is attributed to Paul the Apostle (1:15):

To the pure all things are pure, but to the corrupt and unbelieving nothing is pure; their very minds and consciences are corrupted.

Margaret and Dolcino were captured and executed.

== Theories ==
The main concepts of the Dulcinians were:

- The fall of the ecclesiastical hierarchy, and return of the Church to its original ideals of humility and poverty;
- The fall of the feudal system;
- Human liberation from any restraint, and from entrenched power;
- Creation of a new egalitarian society based on mutual aid and respect, holding property in common and respecting gender equality.

Fra Dolcino was inspired by the millenarist theories of Gioacchino da Fiore. He viewed the history of humanity as 4 epochs:

- The period of the Old Testament;
- The period of Jesus Christ and the Apostles, characterized by chastity and poverty;
- The period of Emperor Constantine I and Pope Sylvester I, characterized by the decline of the church due to ambition and excessive wealth;
- The period of the Apostolics, led by Segarelli and Dolcino, characterized by poverty, chastity and the absence of government.

In his first letter, Dolcino gave his interpretation of the seven angels and seven churches of the Apocalypse of John:

- The angel of Ephesus was Saint Benedict, and his church was the monastic order;
- The angel of Pergamom was Pope Sylvester I, and his church was the clerical order;
- The angel of Sardis was Saint Francis, and his church was the Friars Minor;
- The angel of Laodicea was Saint Dominic, and his church was the Friars Preacher;
- The angel of Smyrna was Gerard of Parma, and his church was the Apostolic Brethren;
- The angel of Thyatira was Fra Dolcino, and his church was the Dulcinian movement;
- The angel of Philadelphia would be the new holy pope, and the last three churches would constitute "the new church of these new days".

Following the death of Boniface VIII, Dolcino produced a schedule of 4 popes:

- Celestine V
- Boniface VIII: ruin would fall on him and the king of the south
- Boniface's successor: ruin would fall on him and all the cardinals
- The new holy pope

Thus, the advent of the "new holy pope" was postponed to the second pope after the death of Boniface VIII. Dolcino never proposed himself as the new pope in his letters, although this was one of the accusations by the Inquisition. The rallying cry poenitentiam agite (do penance) was attributed to them in The Name of the Rose, a novel by Umberto Eco.

== See also ==
- Christian anarchism
- Restorationism

== Bibliography ==
- Anonymous Synchronous, "Historia Fratris Dulcini Heresiarche Novariensis ab A.C. 1304 usque ad A. 1307"
- Bernardo Gui, "De secta illorum qui se dicunt esse de ordine apostolorum"
- "Additamentum ad Historiam fratris Dulcini, haeretici" ab auctore coevo scriptum
- Muratori L., "Raccolta degli Storici Italiani dal 500 al 1500", collects the previous 3 documents, book IX, part V, Città di Castello, C.E.S. Lapi, 1907.
- Johann Lorenz von Mosheim "Geschichte des Apostel-Ordens in dreien Büchern" in "Versuch einer unparteischen und gründlichen Ketzergeschichte", Helmstaedt 1748.
- Mariotti L. (Antonio Gallenga), "Historical memoir of Fra Dolcino and his times", Brown, London 1853, pp.XII-376.
- Orioli Raniero, "Venit perfidus heresiarca. Il movimento apostolico-dolciniano dal 1260 al 1307", Roma 1988.
- Berkhout, Carl T. and Jeffrey B. Russell. "Medieval heresies: a bibliography, 1960-1979." in Subsidia mediaevalia, 11. Toronto: Pontifical Institute of Mediaeval Studies, 1981 (entries Apostolici, Dolcino, Margaret, Segarelli).
