= Michael of Cesena =

13th/14th-century Italian Franciscan minister-general and theologian

Michael of Cesena (Michele di Cesena or Michele Fuschi) (c. 1270 – 29 November 1342) was an Italian Franciscan, minister general of that order, and theologian. His advocacy of evangelical poverty brought him into conflict with Pope John XXII.

== Biography ==
Of his early life little is known. He was born at Cesena. Having entered the Franciscan Order, he studied at Paris and took the doctor's degree in theology in 1316. He taught theology at Bologna and wrote several commentaries on Holy Scripture and the Sentences of Peter Lombard.

At the general chapter in Naples on 31 May 1316, he was elected minister general in absentia and went at once to Assisi, where he convoked a chapter to consider the revision of the Constitutions of the order. Returning to Bologna, he issued the document, Gravi qua premor (21 August 1316), which, together with several other ordinances regarding the matter of poverty, induced John XXII to publish the bull Quorumdam exigit (7 October 1317), whose purpose was to explain the decretals of Nicholas III, Exiit qui seminat (13 August 1279), and of Clement V, Exivi de paradiso (6 May 1312). John XXII ordered rebellious spirituals to stop arguing and obey their superiors. Initially, Michael agreed with the pope in suppressing the spirituals, whom he had been unable to persuade to conform.

As the papal bull concerned the principal chapter of the Franciscan Rule, this action caused no little disturbance within the order. Earlier, in an effort to quell the disagreements between the conventuals and the zelanti, Pope Gregory IX had ruled that all property given to the Franciscans was vested in the Holy See, which granted the friars the mere use of it. This was later confirmed by Pope Nicholas III. John XXII reversed this. By the bull Ad conditorem canonum of 8 December 1322, he declared it ridiculous to pretend that every scrap of food given to the friars and eaten by them belonged to the pope, refused to accept ownership over the goods of the Franciscans in future and granted them exemption from the rule that absolutely forbade ownership of anything even in common, thus forcing them to accept ownership.

Michael of Cesena and his supporters opposed this, asserting that in adopting the strict poverty upon which Cesena had insisted in his letters, they were following the example and teaching of Christ and the Apostles. They held the view that since Christ and the Apostles held no property, neither should the Church. Thus the controversy finally shifted to a speculative theological question: whether or not it was consonant with Catholic faith to hold that Christ and the Apostles had no property individually or in common, and while in the famous dispute at Narbonne in 1321 the inquisitor John of Belna claimed that it was heretical, Berengarius of Perpignan declared it a Catholic dogma in perfect accordance with the decretals of Nicholas III and Clement V.

The matter having been brought before John XXII, a further attempt to settle the controversy was made by distinguishing between dominion and simple use, so that both propositions, Christ and the Apostles had no property, i.e., dominion of property, and Christ and the Apostles possessed property, i.e., the use of property, were true. In the bull Quia nonnunquam (26 March 1322) the pope declared that he intended merely to explain the decrees of his predecessors, and excommunicated anyone who attempted to misconstrue the meaning of the papal Constitution Quorumdam exigit.

In June of the same year a general chapter of the order was convoked at Perugia and decided that to assert that Christ and His Apostles possessed no earthly goods was not only not heretical, but sound and Catholic doctrine. At the same time, Bonagratia of Bergamo was commissioned to represent the chapter before the Papal Curia, at Avignon.

=== Summons to Avignon ===
The controversy continued unabated until, in 1327, Michael was summoned to appear before the pope in Avignon in 1327. Michael eventually agreed to go, after feigning illness and delaying. He obeyed a subsequent summons and was forbidden by the pope under pain of grave censure to leave Avignon. He was thus unable to attend the chapter held at Bologna in May of the following year (1328). Despite his absence and the protest of the papal legate, he was reelected minister general, the chapter deeming the charges against him insufficient to deprive him of office.

Michael managed to win over William of Ockham to his cause. Several prelates and princes wrote to the pope on Cesena's behalf. In the following year, Michael of Cesena, William of Ockham and a few other high-ranking Franciscans fled from the papal court. They had apparently wished to seek the protection of King Robert of Naples (who favored their views), but a storm on the Mediterranean forced their galley back to the port of Aigues-Mortes, where they transferred to another ship manned by agents of Louis IV, Holy Roman Emperor and were taken to Pisa.

=== Deposition ===
At Pisa they were received by the party of Louis and were joined by a number of other schismatics. John XXII was declared to be deposed by the emperor. Michael of Cesena was excommunicated by the Pope. He published a solemn appeal from the pope to a council (12 December 1328), posting it on the door of the cathedral.

The general chapter of Paris (11 June 1329), at which Cardinal Bertrand presided, deposed Michael from the Franciscan leadership, condemned his writings and his and his followers' conduct and elected Gerard Odon minister general of the Franciscan Order.

The pope issued the encyclical Quia vir reprobus, warning the faithful against Michael, and the latter answered in his Ad perpetuam rei memoriam innotescat quod ego, Fr. Michael (25 November 1330) and in Christianæ fidei fundamentum, in which he accused the pope of heresy in the three Bulls, Ad Conditorem Canonum, Cum inter nonnullos, and Quia quorumdam. These and Litteras plurium magistrorum, and Teste Solomone which Michael wrote in his own defence, are contained in William of Ockham's Dialogue.

=== Later life ===
The chapter of Perpignan (25 April 1331) expelled him from the order and sentenced him to perpetual imprisonment. He continued to struggle for his understanding of evangelical poverty for the rest of his life, and issued an appeal against Benedict XII, who had succeeded John XXII, in 1338. He died in Munich, and was buried there in the Franciscan convent, the Barfüsserkirche. He was officially rehabilitated in 1359.

== Cultural references ==
Michael of Cesena is one of the historical characters in Umberto Eco's novel The Name of the Rose. Much of his history is recounted through conversations between the main characters William of Baskerville and Adso.

== Sources ==
- Knysh, G. (1986). "Biographical rectifications in Ockham's Avignon period". Franciscan Studies. 46: 61–91. doi:10.1353/frc.1986.0020.

Catholic Church titles
Preceded by Alessandro Bonini	Minister General of the Order of Friars Minor; 1316–1328	Succeeded by Bertrand de Turre as Vicar general
