= The Name of the Rose =

1980 historical novel by Umberto Eco

- First edition cover (Italian)
- Author: Umberto Eco
- Original title: Il nome della rosa
- Translator: William Weaver
- Language: Italian
- Genre: Historical mystery; historiographic metafiction; postmodernism
- Publisher: Bompiani (Italy); Harcourt (U.S.)
- Publication date: 1980
- Publication place: Italy
- English publication date: 1983
- Media type: Print (hardcover)
- Pages: 512
- ISBN: 978-0-15-144647-6
- Dewey Decimal: 853/.914 19
- LC Class: PQ4865.C6 N613 1983

The Name of the Rose (Italian: Il nome della rosa [il ˈnoːme della ˈrɔːza]) is the 1980 debut novel by Italian author Umberto Eco. It is a historical murder mystery set in an Italian monastery in 1327, and an intellectual mystery combining semiotics in fiction, biblical analysis, medieval studies, and literary theory. It was translated into English by William Weaver in 1983.

The novel has sold over 50 million copies worldwide, becoming one of the best-selling books ever published. It has received many international awards and accolades, such as the Strega Prize in 1981 and Prix Medicis Étranger in 1982, and was ranked 14th on Le Monde's 100 Books of the Century list.

== Plot summary ==
In 1327, Franciscan friar William of Baskerville and his assistant Adso of Melk arrive at a Benedictine abbey in Northern Italy to attend a theological disputation. The abbey is being used as neutral ground in a dispute between Pope John XXII and the Franciscans over the question of apostolic poverty. The monks of the abbey have recently been shaken by the suspicious death of one of their brothers, Adelmo of Otranto, and the abbot asks William (a former inquisitor) to investigate the incident. During his inquiries, William has a debate with one of the oldest monks in the abbey, Jorge of Burgos, about the permissibility of laughter, which Jorge regards as a threat to God's established order.

The second day, another monk, Venantius of Salvemec, is found dead in a vat of pig's blood. He has black stains on his tongue and fingers, suggesting poison. William learns that Adelmo was part of a homosexual love triangle that also involved the librarian, Malachi of Hildesheim, and Malachi's assistant, Berengar of Arundel. The only other monks who knew about these indiscretions were Jorge and Venantius. In spite of Malachi's ban, William and Adso enter the abbey's labyrinthine library. They discover that the library contains a hidden room named the finis Africae after the presumed edge of the world, but they are unable to locate it. In the scriptorium, they find a book on Venantius's desk along with some cryptic notes. Someone snatches the book and they pursue to no avail.

The third day, the monks are surprised by the disappearance of Berengar and William learns that there are two former Dulcinians in the abbey (Remigio of Varagine, the abbey's cellarer, and the deformed monk Salvatore). Adso returns to the library alone in the evening. While leaving the library through the kitchen, he encounters a peasant girl. Although they do not share a language, they have a sexual encounter, Adso's first. After confessing to William, Adso is absolved, although he still feels guilty.

The fourth day, Berengar is found drowned in the abbey's bathhouse. His fingers and tongue bear stains similar to those found on Venantius. The pope's legation now arrives, led by Grand Inquisitor Bernard Gui. Salvatore is discovered attempting to cast a primitive love spell on the peasant girl, and Bernard arrests them both for witchcraft and heresy.

The fifth day is the day of the disputation. Severinus, the abbey's herbalist, tells William that he has found a "strange book" that demands the friar's attention, but William is unable to investigate the discovery until the disputation has ended. When William and Adso arrive at Severinus's laboratory, they find him dead, his skull crushed by a heavy armillary sphere. They search the room for the missing book but are unable to locate it. Remigio is discovered at the scene of the crime and taken into custody by Bernard, who accuses the "heretic" of committing all four homicides. Under threat of torture, Remigio confesses. Remigio, Salvatore, and the peasant girl are taken away and assumed to be doomed. In response to the recent tragedies in the abbey, Jorge gives an apocalyptic sermon about the coming of the Antichrist.

At matins the morning of the sixth day, Malachi drops dead, his fingers and tongue black. The abbot is distraught at William's failure to solve the crimes and orders him to leave the abbey the following day. That night, William and Adso penetrate the library once more and enter the finis Africae by solving Venantius's riddle. They discover Jorge waiting for them in the forbidden room. William has by now arrived at a solution. Berengar revealed the existence of the finis Africae to Adelmo in exchange for a sexual favour. Adelmo, stricken with guilt over this sinful bargain, then committed suicide. Venantius overheard the secret and used it to gain possession of a rare and valuable book that Jorge had hidden in the room. Unbeknownst to him, Jorge had laced its pages with poison, correctly assuming that a reader would have to lick his fingers in order to turn them. Venantius's body was discovered by Berengar, who, fearing exposure, disposed of it in pig's blood before claiming the book and succumbing to its poison. The book was next found by Severinus, but Jorge manipulated Malachi into killing him before he could pass it on to William. Malachi died after ignoring Jorge's warning not to investigate the book's contents. The book itself, now back in Jorge's possession, is the lost second half of Aristotle's Poetics, which discusses the virtues of laughter.

Jorge confirms William's deductions and justifies himself by pointing to the fact that the deaths correspond to the seven trumpets described in the Book of Revelation, and therefore must form part of a divine plan. Two more deaths will complete the sequence: that of the abbot, whom Jorge has trapped in an airless passageway beneath the finis Africae, and that of Jorge himself. He begins consuming the book's poisoned pages and uses Adso's lantern to start a fire in the library.

Adso summons the monks in a futile attempt to extinguish the fire. As the fire consumes the library and spreads to the rest of the abbey, William laments his failure. Confused and defeated, William and Adso escape the abbey. Years later, Adso, now aged, returns to the ruins of the abbey and salvages any remaining scraps and fragments, eventually creating a lesser library.

== Characters ==
=== Primary characters ===
- William of Baskerville – main protagonist, a Franciscan friar
- Adso of Melk – narrator, Benedictine novice accompanying William

=== At the monastery ===
- Abo of Fossanova – the abbot of the Benedictine monastery
- Severinus of Sankt Wendel – herbalist who helps William
- Malachi of Hildesheim – librarian
- Berengar of Arundel – assistant librarian
- Adelmo of Otranto – illuminator, novice
- Venantius of Salvemec – translator of manuscripts
- Benno of Uppsala – student of rhetoric
- Alinardo of Grottaferrata – eldest monk
- Jorge of Burgos – elderly blind monk
- Remigio of Varagine – cellarer
- Salvatore of Montferrat – monk, associate of Remigio
- Nicholas of Morimondo – glazier
- Aymaro of Alessandria – gossipy, sneering monk
- Pacificus of Tivoli
- Peter of Sant’Albano
- Waldo of Hereford
- Magnus of Iona
- Patrick of Clonmacnois
- Rabano of Toledo

=== Outsiders ===
- Ubertino of Casale – Franciscan friar in exile, friend of William
- Michael of Cesena – Minister General of the Franciscans
- Bernard Gui – Inquisitor
- Bertrand del Poggetto – Cardinal and leader of the Papal legation
- Jerome of Kaffa (Jerome of Catalonia aka Hieronymus Catalani) – Bishop of Kaffa
- Peasant girl from the village below the monastery

== Major themes ==
Eco was a professor of semiotics, and employed techniques of metanarrative, partial fictionalization, and linguistic ambiguity to create a world enriched by layers of meaning. The solution to the central murder mystery hinges on the contents of Aristotle's book on Comedy, which has been lost. In spite of this, Eco speculates on the content and has the characters react to it. Through the motif of this lost and possibly suppressed book which might have aestheticized the farcical, the unheroic and the skeptical, Eco also makes an ironically slanted plea for tolerance and against dogmatic or self-sufficient metaphysical truths – an angle which reaches the surface in the final chapters. In this regard, the conclusion mimics a novel of ideas, with William representing rationality, investigation, logical deduction, empiricism and also the beauty of the human minds, against Jorge's dogmatism, censoriousness, and pursuit of keeping, no matter the cost, the secrets of the library closed and hidden to the outside world, including the other monks of the abbey.

The Name of the Rose has been described as a work of postmodernism. The quote in the novel, "books always speak of other books, and every story tells a story that has already been told", refers to a postmodern idea that all texts perpetually refer to other texts, rather than external reality, while also harkening back to the medieval notion that citation and quotation of books was inherently necessary to write new stories. The novel ends with irony: as Eco explains in his Postscript to the Name of the Rose, "very little is discovered and the detective is defeated." After unraveling the central mystery in part through coincidence and error, William of Baskerville concludes in fatigue that there "was no pattern." Thus Eco turns the modernist quest for finality, certainty and meaning on its head, leaving the nominal plot—that of a detective story—broken, the series of deaths following a chaotic pattern of multiple causes, accident, and arguably without inherent meaning.

== The aedificium's labyrinth ==
The mystery revolves around the abbey library, situated in a fortified tower—the aedificium. This structure has three floors—the ground floor contains the kitchen and refectory, the first floor a scriptorium, and the top floor is occupied by the library. The two lower floors are open to all, while only the librarian may enter the last. A catalogue of books is kept in the scriptorium, where manuscripts are read and copied. A monk who wishes to read a book would send a request to the librarian, who, if he thought the request justified, would bring it to the scriptorium. Finally, the library is in the form of a labyrinth, whose secret only the librarian and the assistant librarian know.

The aedificium has four towers at the four cardinal points, and the top floor of each has seven rooms on the outside, surrounding a central room. There are another eight rooms on the outer walls, and sixteen rooms in the centre of the maze. Thus, the library has a total of fifty-six rooms. Each room has a scroll containing a verse from the Book of Revelation. The first letter of the verse is the letter corresponding to that room. The letters of adjacent rooms, read together, give the name of a region (e.g. Hibernia in the West tower), and those rooms contain books from that region, by authors born there or about subjects associated with that region. The geographical regions are:

The aedificium's labyrinth

- Fons Adae, 'The earthly paradise' contains Bibles and commentaries, East Tower
- Acaia, Greece, Northeast
- Iudaea, Judea, East
- Aegyptus, Egypt, Southeast
- [Hic sunt] Leones, Africa and the Islamic world, South Tower
- Yspania, Spain, Southwest outer
- Roma, Italy, Southwest inner
- Hibernia, Ireland, West Tower
- Gallia, France, Northwest
- Germania, Germany, North
- Anglia, England, North Tower

Two rooms have no lettering – the easternmost room, which has an altar, and the central room on the south tower, the so-called finis Africae, which contains the most heavily guarded books, and can only be entered through a secret door. The entrance to the library is in the central room of the east tower, which is connected to the scriptorium by a staircase.

== Title ==
Much attention has been paid to the mystery of what the book's title refers to. In fact, Eco has stated that his intention was to find a "totally neutral title". In one version of the story, when he had finished writing the novel, Eco hurriedly suggested some ten names for it and asked a few of his friends to choose one. They chose The Name of the Rose. In another version of the story, Eco had wanted the neutral title Adso of Melk, but that was vetoed by his publisher, and then the title The Name of the Rose "came to me virtually by chance." In the Postscript to the Name of the Rose, Eco claims to have chosen the title "because the rose is a symbolic figure so rich in meanings that by now it hardly has any meaning left". He further suggests that the title effectively "disorients" the reader, allowing for multiple interpretations rather than a prescribed one.

The book's last line, "Stat rosa pristina nomine, nomina nuda tenemus" translates as: "the rose of old remains only in its name; we possess naked names." The general sense, as Eco pointed out, was that from the beauty of the past, now disappeared, we hold only the name. In this novel, the lost "rose" could be seen as Aristotle's book on comedy (this part of his Poetics is now forever lost), the exquisite library now destroyed, or the beautiful peasant girl now dead.

This text has also been translated as "Yesterday's rose stands only in name, we hold only empty names." This line is a verse by the twelfth-century monk Bernard of Cluny (also known as Bernard of Morlaix). Medieval manuscripts of this line are not in agreement: Eco quotes one Medieval variant verbatim, but Eco was not aware at the time of the text more commonly printed in modern editions, in which the reference is to Rome (Roma), not to a rose (rosa). The alternative text, with its context, runs: Nunc ubi Regulus aut ubi Romulus aut ubi Remus? / Stat Roma pristina nomine, nomina nuda tenemus. This translates as "Where now is Regulus, or Romulus, or Remus? / Primordial Rome abides only in its name; we hold only naked names".

The title may also be an allusion to the nominalist position in the problem of universals, taken by William of Ockham. According to nominalism, universals are bare names: for example, there is not a universal rose, only a bunch of particular flowers that we artificially singled out by naming them "roses".

A further possible inspiration for the title may be a poem by the Mexican poet and mystic Sor Juana Inés de la Cruz (1651–1695):

Rosa que al prado, encarnada,
te ostentas presuntuosa
de grana y carmín bañada:
campa lozana y gustosa;
pero no, que siendo hermosa
también serás desdichada.

This poem appears in Eco's Postscript to the Name of the Rose, and is translated into English in "Note 1" of that book as:

Red rose growing in the meadow,
bravely you vaunt thyself
in crimson and carmine bathed:
displayed in rich and growing state.
But no: as precious as thou may seem,
Not happy soon thou shall be.

== Allusions ==
=== To other works ===
The name of the central character, William of Baskerville, alludes both to the fictional detective Sherlock Holmes (compare The Hound of the Baskervilles – also, Adso's description of William in the beginning of the book resembles, almost word for word, Dr. Watson's description of Sherlock Holmes when he first makes his acquaintance in A Study in Scarlet) and to William of Ockham (see the next section). The name of the novice, Adso of Melk, refers to Melk Abbey in Austria, the site of a famous medieval library. Further, his name echoes the narrator of the Sherlock Holmes stories, Watson (omitting the first and last letters).

The blind librarian Jorge of Burgos is a nod to Argentine writer Jorge Luis Borges, a major influence on Eco. Borges was blind during his later years and was also director of Argentina's national library; his short story "The Library of Babel" is an inspiration for the secret library in Eco's book. Another of Borges's stories, "The Secret Miracle", features a blind librarian. In addition, a number of other themes drawn from various of Borges's works are used throughout The Name of the Rose: labyrinths, mirrors, sects, and obscure manuscripts and books.

The ending also owes a debt to Borges's short story "Death and the Compass", in which a detective proposes a theory for the behaviour of a murderer. The murderer learns of the theory and uses it to trap the detective. In The Name of the Rose, the librarian Jorge uses William's belief that the murders are based on the Revelation to John to misdirect William, though in Eco's tale, the detective succeeds in solving the crime.

The "poisoned page" motif may have been inspired by Alexandre Dumas' novel La Reine Margot (1845). It was also used in the film Il giovedì (1963) by Italian director Dino Risi. A similar story is associated with the Chinese erotic novel Jin Ping Mei, translated as The Golden Lotus or The Plum in the Golden Vase.

Eco seems also to have been aware of Rudyard Kipling's short story "The Eye of Allah", which touches on many of the same themes, like optics, manuscript illumination, music, medicine, priestly authority and the Church's attitude to scientific discovery and independent thought, and which also includes a character named John of Burgos.

Eco was also inspired by the 19th-century Italian novelist Alessandro Manzoni, citing The Betrothed as an example of the specific type of historical novel he purposed to create, in which some of the characters may be made up, but their motivations and actions remain authentic to the period and render history more comprehensible.

Throughout the book, there are Latin quotes, authentic and apocryphal. There are also discussions of the philosophy of Aristotle and of a variety of millenarist heresies, especially those associated with the fraticelli. Numerous other philosophers are referenced throughout the book, often anachronistically, including Wittgenstein.

=== To actual history and geography ===
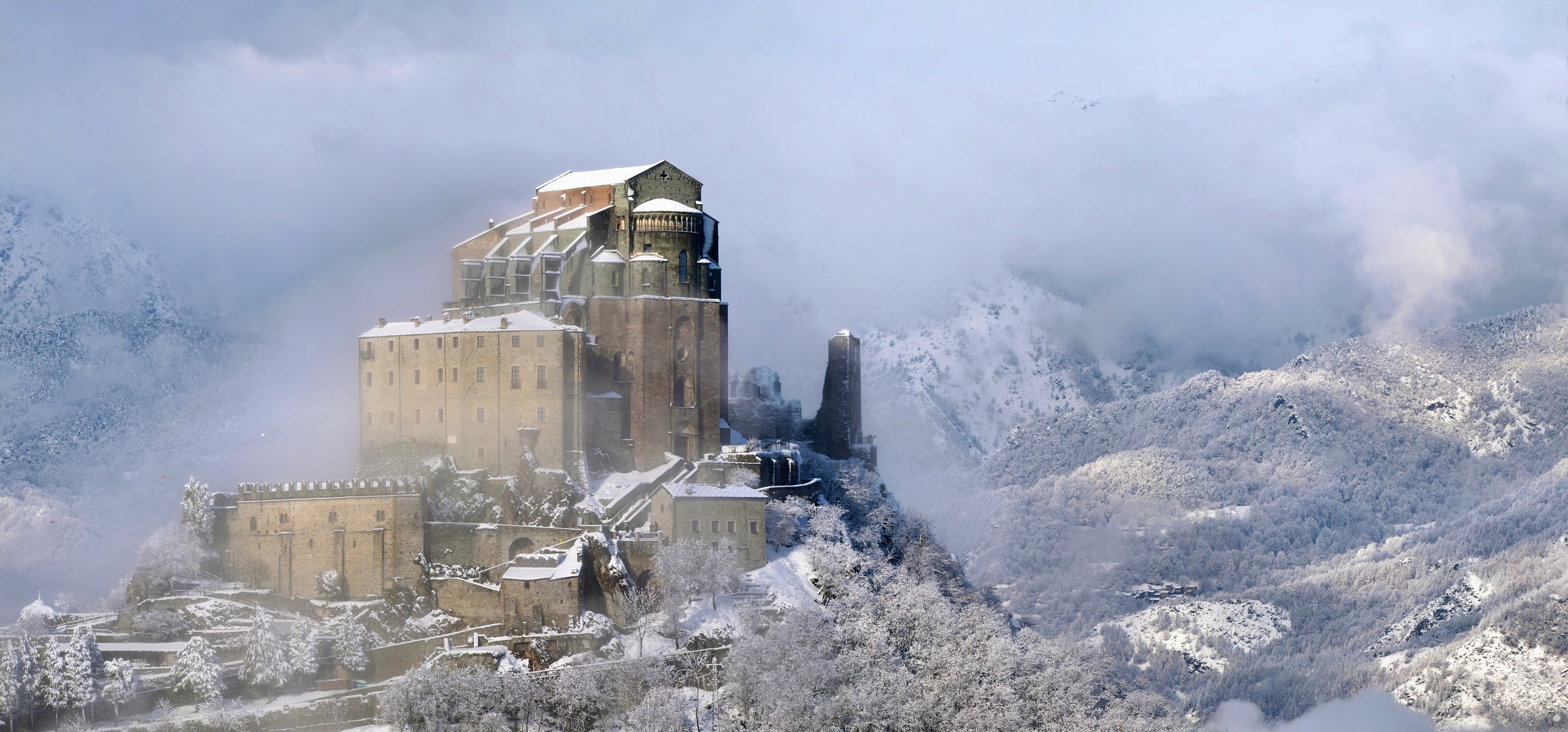
Saint Michael's Abbey, in the Susa Valley, Piedmont, in northwest Italy; reportedly an inspiration for the book

The book describes monastic life in the 14th century. The action takes place at a Benedictine abbey during the controversy surrounding the doctrines about absolute poverty of Christ and apostolic poverty between the Franciscans and the Dominicans; (see renewed controversy on the question of poverty). The setting was inspired by monumental Saint Michael's Abbey in Susa Valley, Piedmont and visited by Umberto Eco.

The book highlights tensions that existed within Christianity during the medieval era: the Franciscans advocated they should renounce all property, and some heretical sects, such as the Dulcinians, began killing the well-to-do, while the clergy at large took to a broader interpretation of the gospel. Also in the background is the conflict between Holy Roman Emperor Louis IV and Pope John XXII, with the Pope condemning the Franciscans’ view on evangelical poverty and the Emperor supporting them as proxies in a larger power struggle at the time over authorities claimed by both the Church and Empire. The novel takes place during the Avignon Papacy and in his Prologue, Adso mentions the election of anti-king Frederick of Austria as a rival claimant to Emperor Louis thirteen years before the story begins. Adso's "Last Page" epilogue describes the Emperor's appointment of Nicholas V as anti-Pope in Rome shortly after Louis IV abandoned reconciliation with John XXII (a decision Adso connects with the disastrous events of the novel's theological conference).

A number of the characters, such as Bernard Gui, Ubertino of Casale and the Franciscan Michael of Cesena, are historical figures, though Eco's characterization of them is not always historically accurate. His portrayal of Bernard Gui in particular has been widely criticized by historians as a caricature; Edward Peters has stated that the character is "rather more sinister and notorious ... than he ever was historically", and he and others have argued that the character is actually based on the grotesque portrayals of inquisitors and Catholic prelates more broadly in eighteenth and nineteenth-century Gothic literature, such as Matthew Gregory Lewis's The Monk (1796). Additionally, part of the novel's dialogue is derived from Gui's inquisitor's manual, the Practica Inquisitionis Heretice Pravitatis. In the inquisition scene, the character of Gui asks the cellarer Remigius, "What do you believe?", to which Remigius replies, "What do you believe, my Lord?" Gui responds, "I believe in all that the Creed teaches", and Remigius tells him, "So I believe, my Lord." Bernard then points out that Remigius is not claiming to believe in the Creed, but to believe that he, Gui, believes in the Creed; this is a paraphrased example from Gui's inquisitor's manual, used to warn inquisitors of the manipulative tendencies of heretics.

Adso's description of the portal of the monastery is recognizably that of the portal of the church at Moissac, France. Dante Alighieri and his Comedy are mentioned once in passing. There is also a quick reference to a famous "Umberto of Bologna" – Umberto Eco himself.

== Adaptations ==
=== Dramatic works ===
- A play adaptation by Grigore Gonţa premiered at National Theatre Bucharest in 1998, starring Radu Beligan, Gheorghe Dinică, and Ion Cojar.

=== Films ===
- In 1986, a film adaptation was directed by Jean-Jacques Annaud starring Sean Connery as William of Baskerville and Christian Slater as Adso.

=== Graphic novels ===
- Milo Manara turned the novel into a graphic novel in two parts in 2023.

=== Games ===
- A Spanish video game adaptation was released in 1987 under the title La Abadía del Crimen (The Abbey of Crime).
- Nomen Rosae (1988), a Spanish ZX Spectrum maze video game developed by Cocasoft and published by MicroHobby. It only depicts the abbey's library of the novel.
- Il Noma della Rosa [sic] (1993) is a Slovak ZX Spectrum adventure video game developed by Orion Software and published by Perpetum.
- Mystery of the Abbey is a board game inspired by the novel, designed by Bruno Faidutti and Serge Laget.
- Ravensburger published an eponymous board game in 2008, designed by Stefan Feld, based on the events of the book.
- Murder in the Abbey (2008), an adventure video game loosely based upon the novel, was developed by Alcachofa Soft and published by DreamCatcher Interactive.
- La Abadía del Crimen Extensum (The Abbey of Crime Extensum), a free remake of La Abadía del Crimen written in Java, was released on Steam in 2016 with English-, French-, Italian-, and Spanish-language versions. This remake greatly enhances the gameplay of the original, while also expanding the story and the cast of characters, borrowing elements from the movie and book. The game is dedicated to Umberto Eco, who died in 2016, and Paco Menéndez, the programmer of the original game.
- The novel and original film provided inspiration for aspects of Thief: The Dark Project, and a full mission in its expansion Thief Gold, specifically, monastic orders and the design of the aedificium. Additionally, in the games' level editor DromEd, the intentionally ugly default texture was given the name "Jorge".
- The 2022 game Pentiment, which also involves a murder-mystery set in and around a medieval monastery, draws heavily from the novel, as confirmed by director Josh Sawyer and cited in the end-game credits.

=== Music ===
- Dutch multi-instrumentalist Arjen Anthony Lucassen released the song "The Abbey of Synn" on his album Actual Fantasy (1996). Lyrics are direct references to the story.
- The Swedish metal band Falconer released the song "Heresy in Disguise" in 2001, part of their Falconer album. The song is based on the novel.
- The British metal band Iron Maiden released the song "Sign of the Cross" in 1995, part of their X Factor album. The song refers to the novel.
- The British rock band Ten released the album The Name of the Rose (1996), whose eponymous track is loosely based around some of the philosophical concepts of the novel.
- Romanian composer Șerban Nichifor released the poem Il nome della rosa for cello and piano 4 hands (1989). The poem is based on the novel.
- The Japanese visual kei band D named their debut album The Name of the Rose as a tribute to the book.
- The Swedish metal band Tribulation released the song "Poison Pages" in 2024, part of their Sub Rosa In Æternum album. The song is based on the novel.
- The Swedish alternative band Asatang Onapig released the song "Jean Jacques Annaud" as second song on their Fearless album (1990). The song contains samples of the director talking about 'The Name of the Rose'.

=== Radio ===
- On 16 and 23 July 2006, a two-part adaptation by Chris Dolan directed by Bruce Young was broadcast on BBC Radio 4 as part of its Classic Serial series, with David Hayman as William of Baskerville, Andrew Sachs as Old Adso, Nick Underwood as Young Adso, Crawford Logan as the Abbot, Jim Norton as Jorge, Christian Rodska as Bernard Gui, Mark McDonnell as Salvatore and Cara Kelly as the Girl.

=== Television ===
- An eight-part miniseries adaptation, The Name of the Rose was produced in Italy in 2018 and premiered on Rai 1 on March 4, 2019. The series was directed by Giacomo Battiato, and stars John Turturro as William of Baskerville, Rupert Everett as Gui, and newcomer Damian Hardung as Adso. The series premiered in the UK on BBC 2 on October 11, 2019.

== Errors ==
Some historical errors present are most likely part of the literary artifice, whose contextualization is documented in the pages of the book preceding the Prologue, in which the author states that the manuscript on which the current Italian translation was later carried out contained interpolations due to different authors from the Middle Ages to the Modern Era. Eco also personally reported some errors and anachronisms present in various editions of the novel until the revision of 2011:

- The novel mentions bell peppers, first in a recipe ("sheep meat with raw pepper sauce"), then in a dream of Adso, but it is an "impossible dish". These peppers were in fact imported from the Americas over a century and a half after the time in which the novel takes place. The same error is repeated later when Adso dreams of a reworking of the Coena Cypriani, in which peppers are among the foods that guests bring to the table.
- During the seventh day-night, Jorge tells William that Francis of Assisi "imitated with a piece of wood the movements of the player violin", an instrument that did not exist before the 16th century.
- At one point in the novel Adso claims to have done something in "a few seconds" when that time measure was not yet used in the Middle Ages.

== See also ==
- Theological fiction

== Sources ==
- Eco, Umberto (1983). The Name of the Rose. Harcourt. ISBN 9780151446476.
- Coletti, Theresa (1988). Naming the Rose. Cornell University Press. ISBN 9780801421143.
- Garrett, J (1991). "Missing Eco, on Reading The Name of the Rose as Library Criticism". The Library Quarterly. 61 (4): 373–388. doi:10.1086/602394.
- Haft, Adele (1999). The Key to The Name of the Rose. University of Michigan Press. ISBN 978-0-472-08621-4.
- Ketzan, Erik. "Borges and The Name of the Rose". Archived from the original on August 14, 2007.
- Wischermann, Heinfried (1997). Romanesque. Konemann.
