= René Quinton =

French biologist and aviator (1866–1925)

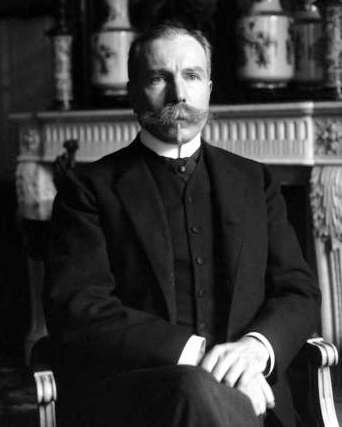
- Quinton in 1908
- Born: René Joseph Quinton; 15 December 1866; Chaumes-en-Brie, France
- Died: 9 July 1925 (aged 58); Paris, France
- Resting place: Loches-sur-Ource, France
- Occupation: Biologist
- Title: President and founder of the Ligue nationale aérienne, vice president of the Ligue aéronautique de France
- Parents: Paul Quinton (father); Marie Amyot (mother)
- Awards: Commandeur de la Légion d'honneur, Croix de guerre (France), 5 Palms, 2 Stars, Croix de guerre (Belgium), Chevalier de l'Ordre de Léopold (Belgium), Distinguished Service Cross (United Kingdom), Distinguished Service Cross (United States), Lieutenant-colonel d'artillerie de réserve

René Joseph Quinton (French pronunciation: [ʁəne kɛ̃tɔ̃]; 15 December 1866 – 9 July 1925) was a French biologist, aviation pioneer and decorated World War I soldier.

In his biology career, Quinton developed a treatment based on seawater injections which he called sérum de Quinton. An aviation pioneer, he was vice president of the Ligue aéronautique de France and a proponent of the development of aviation in France.

During World War I, he rose through the ranks to become an Officer of the Legion of Honour at the end the war, with multiple additional awards and decorations from France and its Allies. After the war, he was made a Commander.

== Early life ==
Quinton was born on 15 December 1866, in the town of Chaumes-en-Brie, Seine-et-Marne, France. His father, Paul Édouard Quinton, was a medical doctor, who also served as the local mayor. His mother, Marie Pauline Élisabeth Amyot, had no profession. He attended secondary school at Collège Chaptal, in Paris.

As a young adult, Quinton was interested in literature; he read and wrote poetry and started writing a novel. He was influenced by Flaubert's work and his writing endeavors were described as perfectionist and meticulous by his friends. According to his friend Armand Charpentier, Quinton's wealthy situation allowed him to spend a lot of time in the pursuit of writing perfection, but after 10 years of writing, and not completing any project, his interests turned to biology.

He decided to enter the Collège de France as an assistant at the Laboratoire de Physiologie pathologique. His passion lay in the study of the origins of life: for Quinton, the sea was the matrix of life, a theory on which he would base the remainder of his career in biology.

Quinton also had an interest in aviation. At the Collège de France, he met French physiologist Étienne-Jules Marey, who was working on the study of flight, and rapidly became his disciple and friend.

== Biology ==
Quinton's interest in the origins of life and seawater as the matrix of life led him to theorize his Loi de constance and to create sérum de Quinton.

=== Loi de Constance ===
Quinton posited a Loi de constance (Law of constancy) that opposed, on some points, Darwin's theory of evolution. In his Loi de constance, he hypothesized that nature repeats rather than evolves. In this Loi, Quinton included the following sub categories: constance marine (marine constancy), constance osmotique (osmotic constancy) and constance thermique (thermal constancy). He reported his findings in the only book he would ever publish: L’eau de mer, milieu organique, in 1904.

The publication provoked disagreements and was met with resistance, nonetheless, it was the basis for therapeutic applications that Quinton would begin in the following years.

Today, Quinton's book is published as part of the French cultural heritage, but its content is considered antiquated and the views it describes not valid.

=== Sérum de Quinton ===
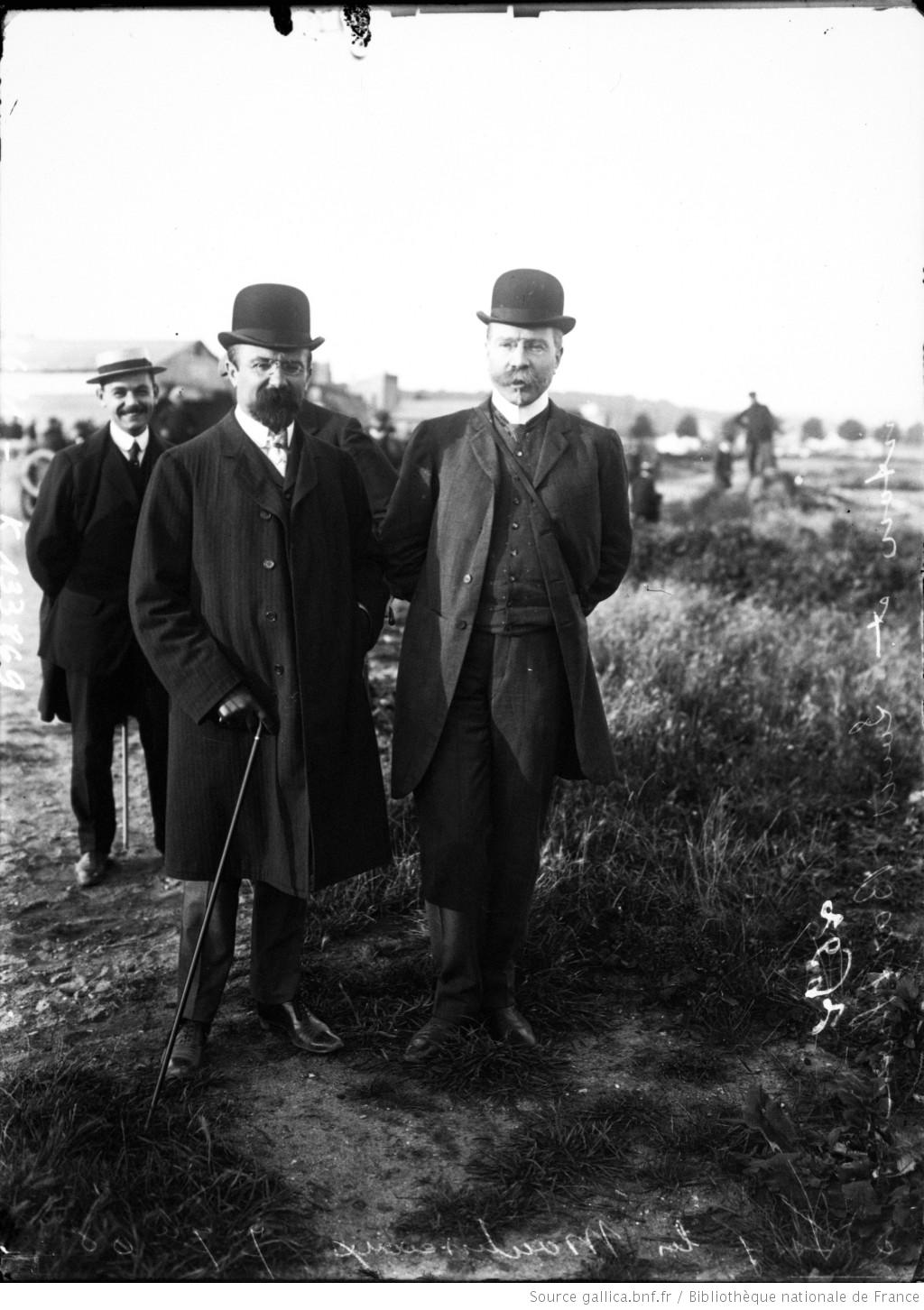
M. René Quinton and Louis Barthou Issy-les-Moulineaux, September 7th, 1908

Quinton's theories led him to conclude “that Seawater is the "vital liquid" of all living beings and the means of curing all kinds of disease”. He imagined subcutaneous seawater injections as a therapeutic treatment.

In 1907, Quinton patented the sérum de Quinton (Quinton serum). He described it as seawater harvested from the Atlantic, in specific areas where he considered the water “pure” and with special precautions. The harvest was then immediately transported to Paris where it was sterilized without boiling or chemical products, brought to a specific saline concentration, and stored in vials. With this patented technique, the serum was comparable, according to Quinton, to blood. As such, it could be used to treat the following conditions: enteritis, constipation, diarrhea, colitis, newborn gastroenteritis, lactose intolerance, athrepsia, and skin conditions. It was also presented as a prenatal treatment to prevent the future baby(ies) from developing tuberculosis, syphilis or malaria, and to help expecting mothers with nausea.

He proceeded to open and fund Parisian dispensaries, reserved for destitute patients, to treat, at no charge, these conditions.

These treatments were reported, at the time, to be very successful and with no side effects. However, they have since been abandoned by medicine and removed from the Vidal dictionary, the French dictionary that catalogs medications and dietary supplements. Today, Quinton serum continues to be sold by Quinton Laboratory as personal and hygiene products, not medicine, in the form of drinkable vials or nasal sprays.

=== The dog experiments ===
Some experiments of René Quinton, to support his theory that seawater can be used as a substitute for blood, are the dog experiments. In his 1897 experiments, Quinton reported the following. He removed the totality of a dog's blood and replaced it with sterilized seawater. The dog developed an infection and fever, but went on to recuperate within 5 days, and was still alive 5 years later. Quinton concluded that his purified seawater formula could be used as a substitute for blood transfusion. Harriett Hall challenges the study: “There is a huge body of established scientific knowledge that would have to be overthrown before we could accept that an animal’s entire blood volume could be replaced with saline without resulting in death. Extraordinary claims require extraordinary evidence, and this century-old report doesn’t even meet the standards of ordinary peer-reviewed published evidence.”

== Aviation ==
Another area of interest for René Quinton was aviation.

In 1908, inspired by other countries offering rewards to creators of aircraft, as well as France's success in ballooning, René Quinton, along with Archdeacon and others, founded the Ligue Nationale Aérienne, of which he was president. His goal was to set up a yearly subscription that would generate enough money to offer a prize to the first French creator to invent an ideal aircraft. The league's role was to encourage and promote enthusiasm for aviation, with the hope that France would become a leader in the field. Quinton also lobbied for the development of aircraft as an important way to spot injured soldiers and bring them to safety for care.

Quinton was president of the league for 4 years after which he left for the war. When he returned, Quinton drew back from this project, focusing on sérum de Quinton instead. He facilitated the fusion of his league with l’Association Genérale Aéronautique and the Comité National de l’Aviation Militaire; these 3 societies combined to form the Ligue Aéronautique de France, with General Bailly as president, and Reymond and Quinton as vice-presidents.

A meeting took place in Biskra, where several aviators presented their creations. A second meeting was planned, but Quinton died unexpectedly before then.

== World War I ==
When World War I broke out, Quinton was not required to go to combat due to his age. Nonetheless, according to Georges Houard, Quinton's strong patriotism and love of France compelled him to go to war.

At the beginning of the war, in 1914, he fought as capitaine d'artillerie de réserve. Throughout the war, his fellows and superiors described him as brave, composed and eager; Foch wrote the following about Quinton: "Officer of the rarest intrepidity, for whom it is impossible to resume the acts of bravery. Continues to show the best example of composure, energy and drive." He rose through the ranks to end the war as Officier de la Légion d'honneur, with multiple decorations.

=== Battlefronts ===
René Quinton fought on the following battlefronts during World War I:

Year	Date(s)	Location(s)
1914	30 August	Amiens
1914	28 September to 4 October	Courcelles-le-Comte, Achiet, Bucquoy-les-Essarts
1914	5 to 11 October	Hannescamps, Bienvilliers-au-Bois
1914	13 to 22 October	Ronsart, Mouchy-au-Bois
1914	23 October to 2 November	Wailly
1914	7 November to 31 December	Nieuport, Lombardzyde
1915	1 January to 31 December	Nieuport
1916	1 January to 30 May	Around Nieuport
1916	6 June to 2 November	Somme (Suzanne, Curlus, Maurepas, Rancourt, Sailly-Saillisel)
1917	10 to 18 March	Roye-Lassigny, Beuvraignes, Roiglise, Champien, Solente, Ercheu
1917	April	Moronvilliers, Mont-sans-Nom, Téton
1917	10 July to 3 September	Mort-Homme, Cote 304
1917	6 to 15 September	Champagne (Saint-Hilaire-le-Grand)
1917	28 September to 1 November	Malmaison
1918	18 February to 17 March	Trigny
1918	17 to 27 March	Reims
1918	4 to 27 April	Montdidier
1918	24 May to 30 June	Fort Saint-Thierry, Gueux, Chamery
1918	17 July to 6 August	Sud de Soissons
1918	8 to 24 August	massif de Thiescourt
1918	23 September to 13 October	Navarin, Somme-Py, Saint-Etienne au Temple
1918	29 October to 8 November	Coulommes, Attigny, Mézières

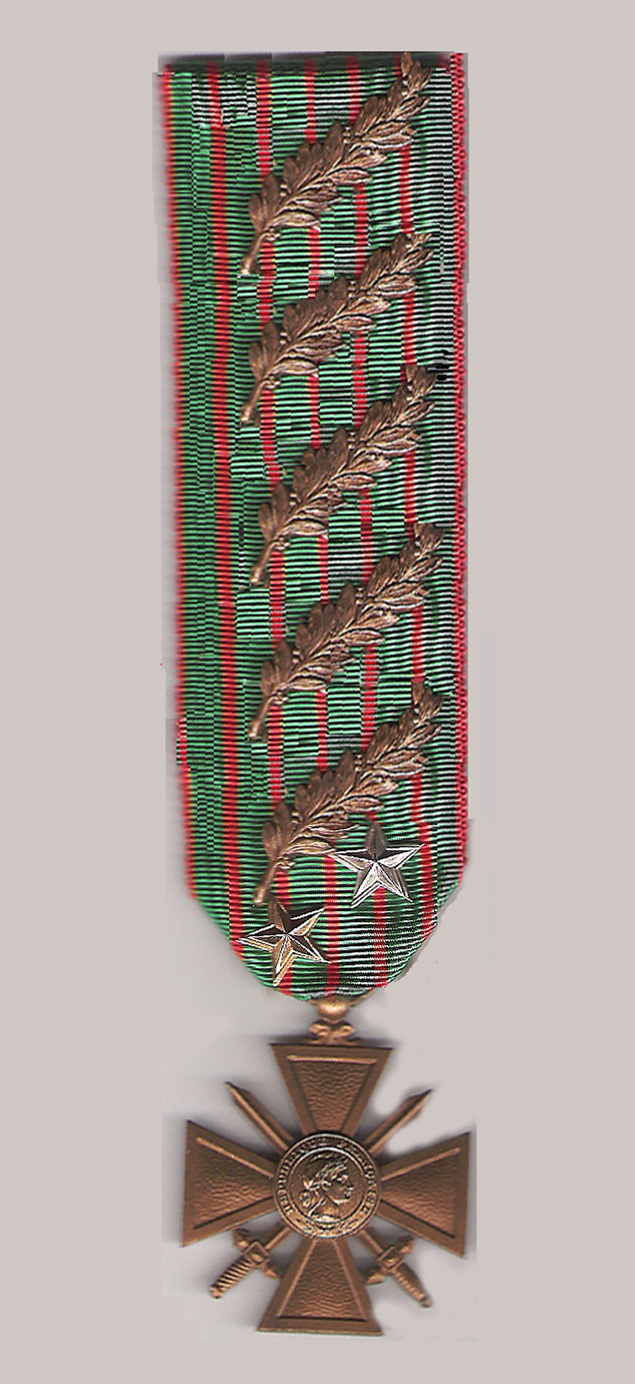
Croix de Guerre 1914–1918 with 5 palms

=== Injuries ===
During the war, Quinton suffered 8 injuries, including receiving a shrapnel to the nape, multiple head and face contusions, and injuries and frostbite to the feet.

=== Military titles and awards ===
For his war efforts, René Quinton received the following titles and awards from the French military:

- Chevalier de la Légion d'honneur, on 20 July 1916
- Officier de la Légion d'honneur, on 10 July 1917
- Commandeur de la Légion d'honneur, on 16 June 1920
- Croix de guerre, 5 Palms and 2 Stars

Quinton was also recognized in Allied countries. On 26 November 1914, he was named Chevalier de l'Ordre de Léopold in Belgium, and in 1916 he received the Croix de guerre from Belgium too. He received the Distinguished Service Cross from the United Kingdom on 27 August 1917 and on 5 March 1919 from the United States.

== Death ==
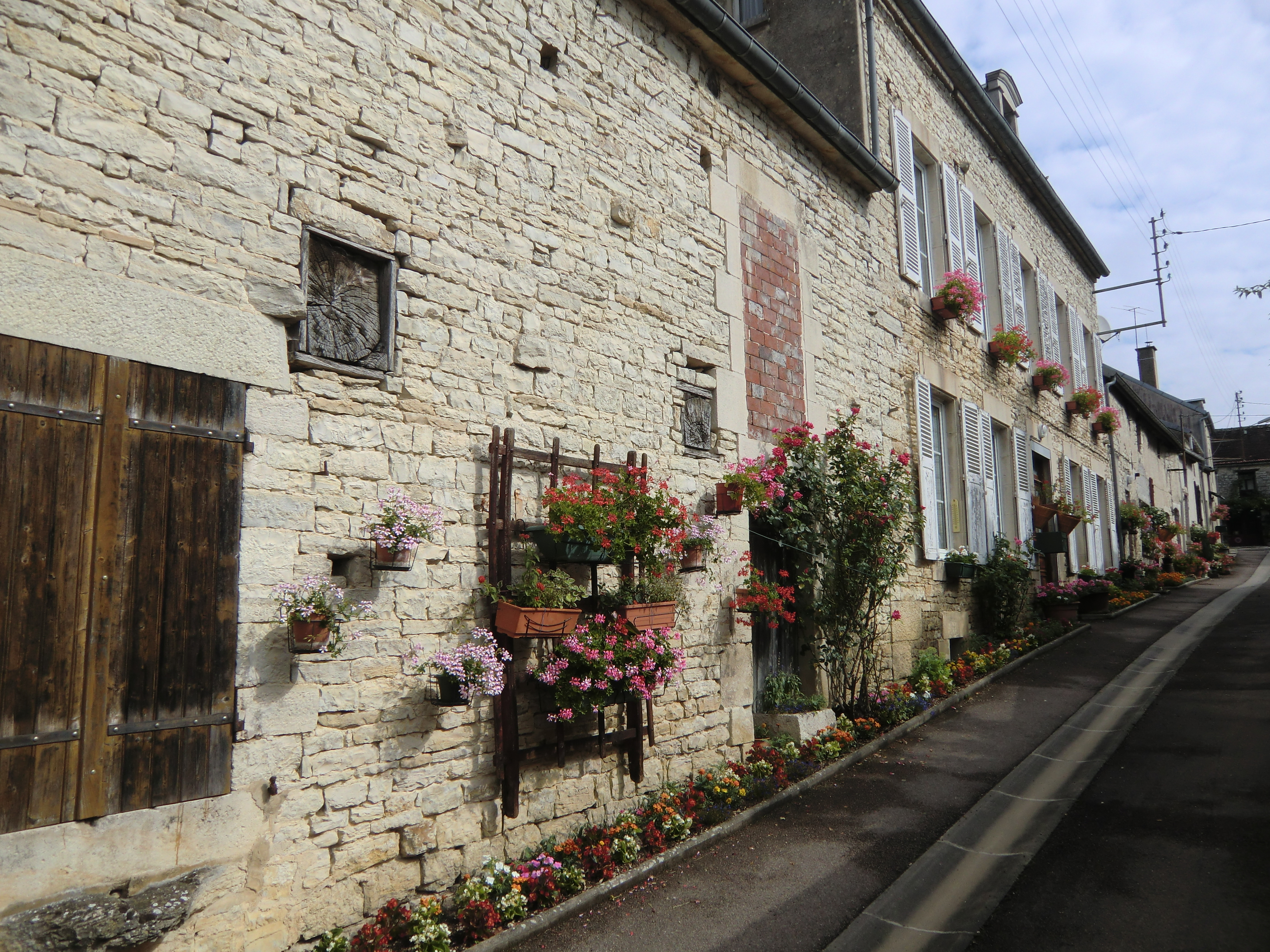
Loches-sur-Ource, Rue Quinton

Quinton died unexpectedly on 9 July 1925, from a sudden-onset heart condition; he was 58 years old.

On his deathbed, he identified as a soldier: he told his comrades, while saying his final goodbyes, "and that is why I insisted to die in my soldier's garments". He was with his cousin Lucien Corpechot when he passed.

He was buried in his family vault in Loches-sur-Ource, Aube.

A statue commemorating Quinton was erected in his birth town of Chaumes-en-Brie in 1931. It featured a bronze statue sculpted by Paul Dardé. However, in 1941, the statue was removed and melted by the occupying German army. Today, only the base of the statue remains and can be seen in its original location in the Champ de Foire of Chaumes-en-Brie.

== Bibliography ==
During his lifetime, Quinton published his findings in biology in the following book, which is currently published as a historical heritage book, as the contents are considered out of date: L'eau de mer milieu organique: constance du milieu marin originel, comme milieu vital des cellules (1904).

Some of his written words were also compiled in the following book about war: Maximes sur la guerre (1930).

=== English translations ===
- Maxims on War, translation by Edward Maxwell III, Baldwin City, Imperium Press, 157 p., 2025 ISBN 978-1923478091
