= Paul Dardé =

French sculptor

Paul Dardé (4 July 1888 – 29 December 1963) was a noted French sculptor. He spent his early career in Paris, and his later career in Saint-Maurice-Navacelles.

== Biography ==
Dardé was born in Olmet near Lodève in Hérault. His primary schooling was at the Frères des Écoles Chrétiennes in Lodève until the age of 13. He then attended a seminary, considering an ecclesiastical vocation, but left after only two months. His artistic talents soon showed themselves and he chose sculpture as his preferred medium. He was taken under the wing of Max Theron, the engraver and professor of design at the Lycée in Lodève, who tutored him in design and engraving. After military service at Montpellier, he attended evening classes at the École des Beaux-Arts where he won several prizes and a grant to cover a trip to Italy. He spent time in Venice, Bologne, Florence and Rome. He lived a frugal life in order to prolong his stay. He returned to the Beaux-Arts de Paris and studied under Injalbert and Rodin who took him into his studio although he only stayed there for three days! One of his early works, "L'éternelle douleur" was executed in 1913 and can be seen today in the Musée d'Orsay. He was called into service (as a stretcher-bearer) in the 1914–1918 war and was wounded. His brother was killed in that war. He subsequently returned to Montpellier where he completed a sculpture of "Jeanne d'Arc" and several compositions for tombs in the cemetery at St Lazare. He then began working on a series of war memorials.

In 1920, he was awarded the Grand Prix National des Arts and his composition entitled "Faune" was put into the Musée Rodin, and then in the park of the Château de Vizille. In 1925 he exhibited at the Salon des Arts Décoratifs. In 1930 he completed a bust of Macbeth and a statue of a prehistoric man which was placed at the entry to the Musée des Eyzies. In 1931 his statue of René Quinton was inaugurated at Chaumes in Brie.

At the 1931 Salon he showed the works "Thais aux Enfers" and "Christ aux outrages". Despite these successes he had many problems and in 1935 left Paris leaving a trail of debts and as a consequence of his financial woes his works were seized and his studio put up for sale, which reportedly led him to develop a persecution mania. He set himself up in Saint-Maurice-Navacelles and worked on drawings with various themes; a Chanson de Roland, la Croisade des Albigeois, Dante, Macbeth, Hamlet, the Bible, Attila, les hommes préhistoriques et moyenâgeux, les Mongols, Tolstoï and Beethoven. Age and bad health forced him eventually to return to Lodève and he died in relative poverty there on 29 December 1963. He is buried in Olmet.

== The war memorial at Lumel ==
The Lumel war memorial stands at the entrance to the Jean Hugo park in Lumel. The memorial lists no names and has two inscriptions:

- "à la mémoire glorieuse de ses enfants de lunel"
- "à tous ceux morts pour la france".

== The war memorial at Le Bousquet-d'Orb ==
This memorial stands in the Place Pierre Masse and next to the Mairie. It lists the names of 73 men of Le Bousquet-d'Orb who died in the two World Wars.

== The war memorial at Lodève ==
This is one of France's best known war memorials. Dardé's composition comprises a group of five women and two children and the body of a dead soldier. Four of the women stand at the rear whilst a fifth, possibly the widow or mother of the dead soldier, lies at his side. The children hold laurel leaves. The work stands in a public park, once the garden of the bishops of Lodève and near the old episcopal palace and the cathedral.

Dardé dresses four of the women in clothes worn in the different seasons-spring, summer, autumn and winter. He tries to show the different social classes who all suffered losses in that most terrible war; all sectors of society were to lose loved-ones. Two children are added to symbolize "innocence". Dardé used Lens stone for the work. Work commenced in 1919 and the inauguration took place in 1930.

== The war memorial at Clermont-l'Hérault ==
What could be taken as a mausoleum sits on a pedestal. It is reached by 11 steps of grey granite. They are arranged in two flights with the width slowly decreasing. The rear and sides of the mausoleum have false arched windows but at the front is an opening covered by an ornamental iron grille. Beyond this grille is a niche into which Dardé's composition has been placed. This comprises the body of a dead soldier who is watched over, not by an angel or a grieving wife or mother but by a nude woman who has been likened by some to a circus or cabaret performer. The sculpture was completed between 1924 and 1925 and the memorial was completed in 1931. It has always courted controversy. Perhaps the nature of the woman is some form of protest by Dardé. He was throughout his life a complex and troubled man.

== The war memorial at Saint-Maurice-Navacelles ==
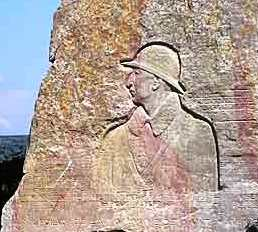
Part of Saint-Maurice-Navacelles war memorial

This limestone war memorial features a relief carving by Dardé of a French soldier of the 1914–1918 war. It could be described as a silhouette. It was executed in 1924. It lists the names of the 19 men of Saint-Maurice-Navacelles who died in the war.

== The war memorial at Saint-Martin-de-Londres ==
The Dardé composition on the Saint-Martin-de-Londres war memorial includes the carving of a rifle, oak leaves and the Croix de Guerre. The memorial lists the 27 men of the parish who died in the war.

== The war memorial at Soubès ==
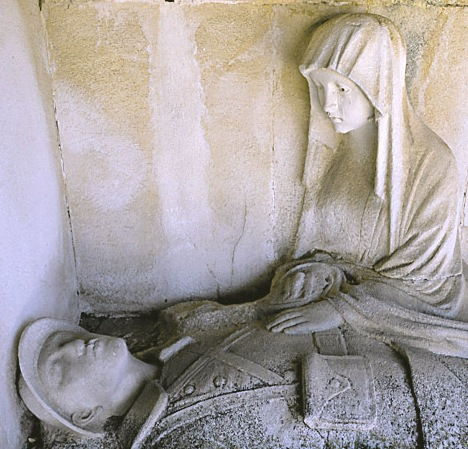
Part of war memorial at Soubès

This war memorial features a beautiful work by Dardé featuring a young woman weeping over a dead soldier. A complete contrast with the composition at Clermont-l'Hérault!

== The War Memorial at Limoux ==
This is located by the Saint Martin cemetery wall in the avenue Fabre-d'Eglantine. Dardé's composition is unusual in that whilst it features the body of a dead soldier, the soldier is placed in a standing position! At his feet is a vanquished German Imperial eagle.

The memorial, erected in 1924, takes the form of an obelisk positioned on a pedestal. The pedestal is of granite whilst the obelisk is carved from Lens stone. The statue of the soldier stands at the front of the obelisk.

== Statue on the tomb of the Milhaud family ==
Dardé carved a Cross for this tomb in the Saint-Maurice-Navacelles cemetery.

== Sculptural work on the tomb of the family of Thomas Bonnate ==
This 1913 work, featuring a weeping woman, can be found in the Montpellier cemetery in the avenue Saint-Lazare. It is thought to be Dardé's first commission.

== Sculptures in the Museum Fleury in Lodève ==
This museum has a permanent collection of Paul Dardé's work. Outside the museum is a copy of the famous statue of a Neandertal done by Paul Dardé in 1930 known as "L'homme de Cro-Magnon" although Dardé called it "L'homme primitif".

== Statue of prehistoric man ==
This work is located at Les Eyzies-de-Tayac-Sireuil in the Dordogne, a model named Homo sapiens neanderthalensis is present at Lodève (Hérault, France) in the Halle Dardé.

== "Le Faune" ==
This work, carved from Euville stone and executed in 1920, stands in the garden of the Musée Rodin.
