= Royères =

- Commune
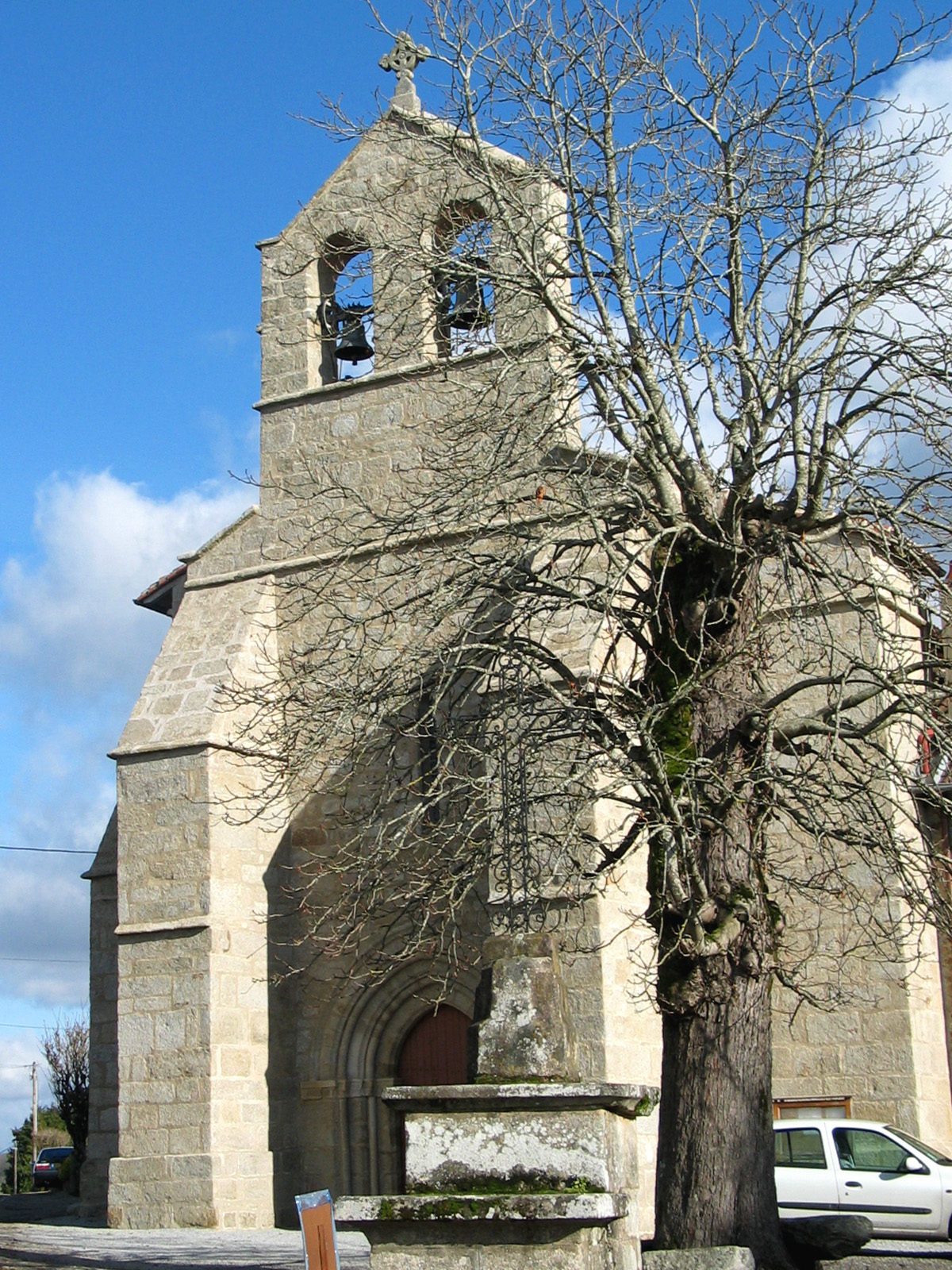
- The church of the Nativity of the Virgin, in Royères
- Location of Royères
- Location within France Location within Nouvelle-Aquitaine
- Coordinates: 45°50′58″N 1°25′52″E
- Country: France
- Region: Nouvelle-Aquitaine
- Department: Haute-Vienne
- Arrondissement: Limoges
- Canton: Saint-Léonard-de-Noblat
- Intercommunality: Noblat

Government
  - Mayor (2020–2026): Franck Letoux
- Area^{1}: 17.42 km^{2} (6.73 sq mi)
- Elevation: 365 m (1,198 ft)
- Highest elevation: 484 m (1,588 ft)
- Lowest elevation: 235 m (771 ft)
- Population (2023): 951
  - Density: 54.6/km^{2} (141/sq mi)
- Time zone: UTC+01:00 (CET)
  - Summer (DST): UTC+02:00 (CEST)
- INSEE/Postal code: 87129 /87400
- ^{1} French Land Register data, which excludes lakes, ponds, glaciers > 1 km^{2} (0.386 sq mi or 247 acres) and river estuaries.

Royères (French pronunciation: [ʁwajɛʁ]; Occitan: Roiéra) in a commune in the Haute-Vienne department in the Nouvelle-Aquitaine region in west-central France.

== Personalities ==
Royères was the birthplace of the Dominican inquisitor, Bishop of Lodève and prolific author Bernard Gui, circa 1261.

== See also ==
- Communes of the Haute-Vienne department
