= Fulcran =

11-century French bishop and saint

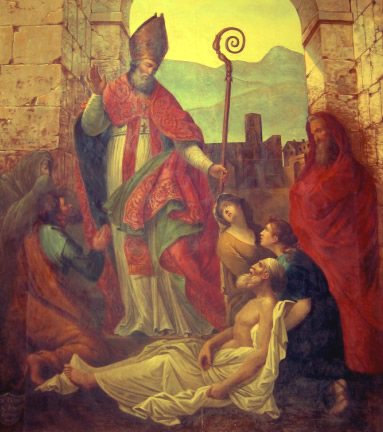
- The Miracle of Saint Fulcran, by François Matet (1805)

Bishop of Lodève
- Born: unknown
- Died: 13 February 1006
- Venerated in: Catholic Church
- Feast: 13 February
- Patronage: Diocese of Lodève

Saint Fulcran (died 13 February 1006) was a French saint. He was bishop of Lodève.

== Life ==
According to the biography by Bernard Guidonis, himself bishop of Lodève (died 1331), Fulcran came of a distinguished family, consecrated himself at an early age to the service of the Church, became a priest, and from his youth led a pure and holy life.

When in 949 Theoderich, Bishop of Lodève, died, Fulcran, notwithstanding his unwillingness, was chosen as his successor and was consecrated by the Archbishop of Narbonne on 4 February of the same year.

He was untiring in his efforts to conserve the moral life within his diocese, especially among the clergy and the religious orders; he rebuilt many churches and monasteries, among them Lodève Cathedral, then dedicated to Saint Genesius of Arles but now to Saint Fulcran himself, and the church of Saint-Sauveur (the Holy Saviour) with an attached Benedictine monastery.

The poor and the sick were the objects of his special care; for their support he founded hospitals and endowed others already existing. After administering his diocese for over half a century, he died in 1006.

== Veneration ==
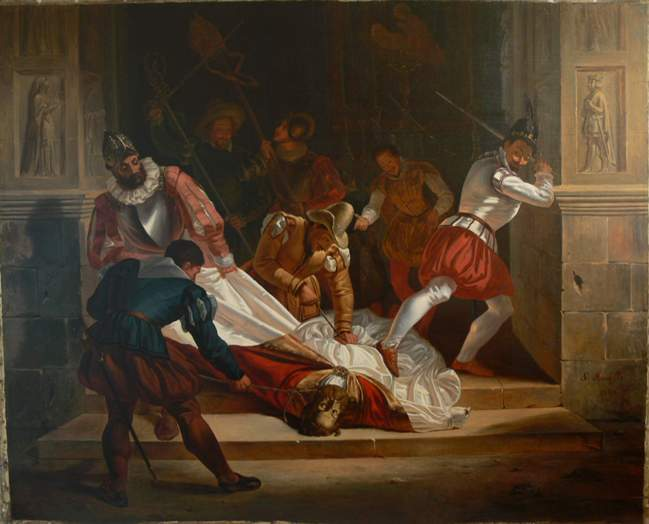
The Body of Saint Fulcran Desecrated by Protestants, by François Matet (1834)

After his death he was buried in Lodève Cathedral and honoured as a saint. His body, which had been preserved intact, was burned by the Huguenots in 1572, and only a few particles of his remains were saved. He is the second patron of the Diocese of Lodève, and his feast falls on 13 February.

Lodève celebrates the Fête de St. Fulcran every year in May for a week, during which there is a carnival and other events.
