= Soubès =

- Commune
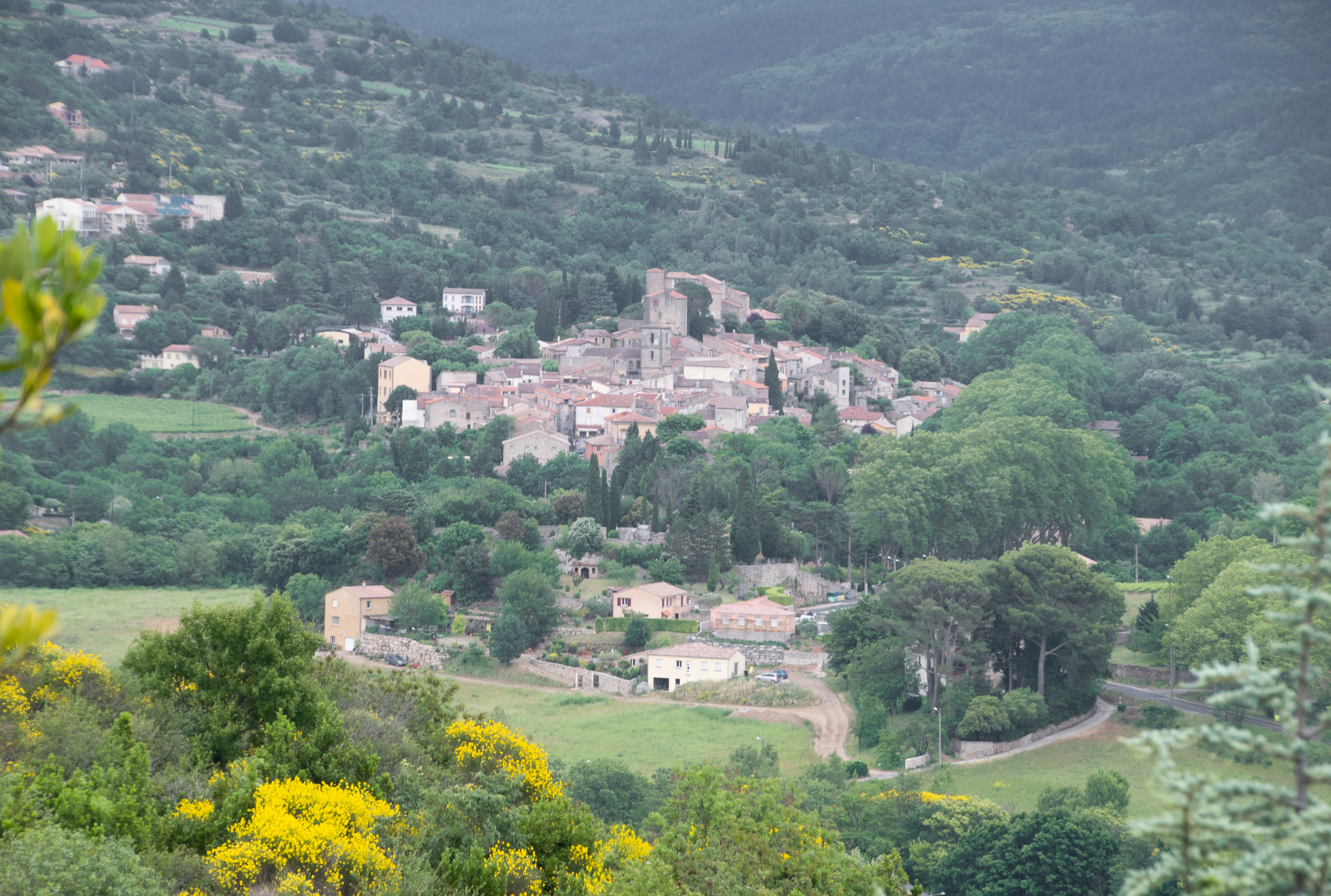
- View of Soubès from Poujols
- Location of Soubès
- Location within France Location within Occitanie
- Coordinates: 43°46′04″N 3°20′49″E
- Country: France
- Region: Occitania
- Department: Hérault
- Arrondissement: Lodève
- Canton: Lodève
- Intercommunality: Lodévois-Larzac

Government
  - Mayor (2021–2026): Isabelle Perigault
- Area^{1}: 12.35 km^{2} (4.77 sq mi)
- Highest elevation: 733 m (2,405 ft)
- Lowest elevation: 190 m (620 ft)
- Population (2023): 948
  - Density: 76.8/km^{2} (199/sq mi)
- Demonym: Soubésiens
- Time zone: UTC+01:00 (CET)
  - Summer (DST): UTC+02:00 (CEST)
- INSEE/Postal code: 34304 /34700
- ^{1} French Land Register data, which excludes lakes, ponds, glaciers > 1 km^{2} (0.386 sq mi or 247 acres) and river estuaries.

Soubès (French pronunciation: [subɛs]; Occitan: Sobès) is a commune in the Hérault department in Occitanie in southern France, situated on a hill near the confluence of the Brèze and Suberbet rivers.

The village dates from the 12th Century, and even today only one main street, the Coural, is suitable for motor traffic. The ancient city walls are visible in many places. The village has two châteaux, a church, two schools, a Mairie, a café (Café du Terral), a small post office and a general store. A modern sports and social centre lies just outside the village proper, the other side of the D25 road to Ganges.

== Economy ==
Until very recent times the village was surrounded by vineyards, and viticulture was the primary economic activity. Stocks of the widely grown Carignan red grape variety are very sturdy, and the characteristic vineyards of the region therefore have no trellises. Soubès never had its own wine-making facility, however, and vignerons are obliged to take their grapes to the Cave Coopérative either in Lodève or Pégairolles-de-l'Escalette.

Overproduction of the local table wine has forced a decline in viticulture recently, and the production of other fruit such as peaches and apricots has partly replaced the wine-based economy.

== Festival ==
Like all villages of the region, Soubès takes pride in its annual fête, which is held the weekend following the first Monday in August.

Traditional festive events include dances every night, pétanque and belotte tournaments, and a very popular game of loto. Sometimes yearling bulls are run through the Coural in an abrivado, a very tamed-down version of the Pamplonada.

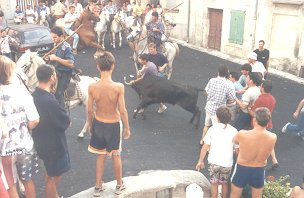
The 1994 Fête - yearling bulls in the Place de la Fontaine

In the month of August the population doubles and redoubles as summer visitors (estivants) arrive to enjoy the hot climate and peaceful atmosphere.

== Administration ==
List of recent mayors
| From | To | Name |
|---|---|---|
| 1958 | March 1995 | Jean Lassalle |
| March 1995 | March 2008 | Marie-Claire Rudelle |
| March 2008 | July 2021 | José Pozo |
| July 2021 | Present | Isabelle Périgault |

== Population ==
Historical population
| Year | Pop. | ±% p.a. |
|---|---|---|
| 1968 | 370 | — |
| 1975 | 455 | +3.00% |
| 1982 | 565 | +3.14% |
| 1990 | 616 | +1.09% |
| 1999 | 710 | +1.59% |
| 2007 | 872 | +2.60% |
| 2012 | 896 | +0.54% |
| 2017 | 931 | +0.77% |
| 2023 | 948 | +0.30% |
Source: INSEE

== See also ==
- Official web site
- Communes of the Hérault department
