= Lodève Cathedral =

Coordinates: 43°43′55″N 3°19′2″E

Lodève Cathedral Cathédrale Saint-Fulcran de Lodève
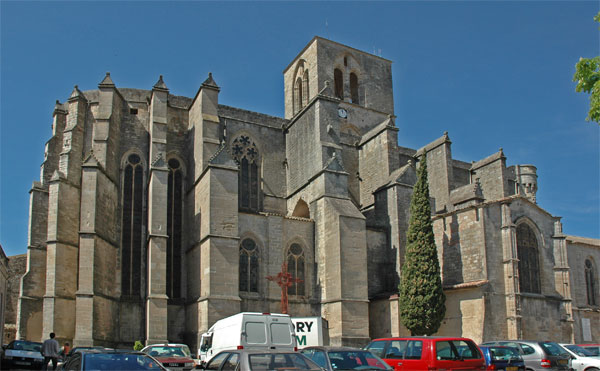
- Lodève Cathedral

Religion
- Affiliation: Roman Catholic Church
- Province: Diocese of Montpellier
- Region: Hérault
- Rite: Roman
- Ecclesiastical or organisational status: Cathedral
- Status: Active

Location
- Location: Lodève, France
- Interactive map of Lodève Cathedral; Cathédrale Saint-Fulcran de Lodève

Architecture
- Type: church
- Groundbreaking: 6th century
- Completed: 20th century

Lodève Cathedral (French: Cathédrale Saint-Fulcran de Lodève) is a Roman Catholic church in Lodève, Hérault, southern France. The edifice is a typical example of local Gothic architecture.

Lodève is an ancient town of Celtic origin, situated some 50 kilometres (as the crow flies) from the Mediterranean coast. It sits at the foot of the mountains of the Languedoc-Roussillon region, about 45 kilometres north-west of Montpellier. The former Diocese of Lodève, probably founded towards the end of the 4th century, was suppressed during the French Revolution and was not restored; its territory was instead attached to the Diocese, later (2002) Archdiocese, of Montpellier. In 1877, the Bishop of Montpellier was granted the privilege by Pope Pius IX on including the title of the former diocese of Lodève in his own titulature. The bishops and archbishops have not done so.

The cathedral, the former seat of the Bishops of Lodève, was classed a national historical monument in 1840.

== Patrons ==
Originally the cathedral was dedicated to Saint Genesius of Arles, a legal clerk in Arles, who was beheaded in 303 during the Diocletian persecution (his martyrdom is depicted on the keystone of the vault of the apse). Since 1410 the cathedral has been dedicated to Saint Fulcran, who as bishop of Lodève restored the cathedral in the 10th century.

== Structure ==
=== Early buildings ===
Some traces of previous buildings are preserved in the crypt. However, there are not traces of the first cathedral, which dates from the end of the 4th century, when diocese was founded. Some capitals dating from the 6th to the 8th centuries, and now in the Musée Fleury, suggest building from the time of the Visigoths. The exterior walls of the crypt also seem to date from this period. In the 10th century, Saint Fulcran had the cathedral either rebuilt or extended, and reconsecrated it in 975. The doubling of the crypt walls towards the exterior and its vault were part of this structure.

=== Gothic architecture ===
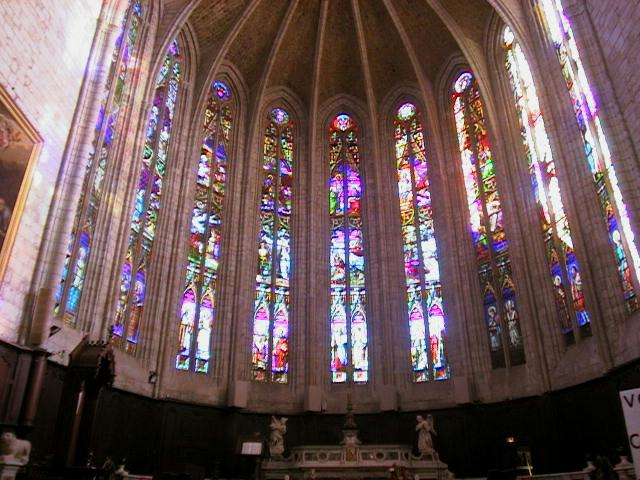
Apse, stained glass windows.

A choir consisting of a single, extremely broad nave, and a polygonal apse of nine bays lit by nine Gothic windows 12 metres high, is extended to the west by a nave of three aisles. The main portal is richly ornamented and is located in the middle of the north side, under a porch. Opposite, on the south side, stands a bell-tower that is over 57 metres tall. The nave is entirely flanked by side chapels. The west front, which has no tower, has a beautiful rose window and a chemin de ronde. The cloister is to the south of the choir. The cathedral is a typical Gothic building of the south of France, majestic and austere, reflecting the stylistic influence of the mendicant orders.

=== Construction history ===
The written sources from the period of the construction of the Gothic cathedral are few, originating from the bishops Bernard Gui (1324-1331) and Guillaume Briçonnet (1489-1519) who was also Bishop of Meaux and spiritual director of Marguerite de Navarre. They give only indirect information on the progress of the construction, and it is therefore necessary to resort to comparative stylistic dating (according to Curtius).

The Gothic structure was begun with the apse in about 1265/1270. The second phase in the 1270s comprised the choir and the chapel of Saint Andrew (now the chapel of the Sacred Heart) which lies alongside the northern wall of the choir.

In the third phase, during the later 1270s and the early 1280s, the two eastern bays of the northern side of the nave were built, as well as the adjacent chapel of Saint Fulcran, the portal and its porch. The choir was vaulted, and temporarily closed off so that it could be used for services.

In a fourth phase of about 1295/1300 the north side was completed, with the chapel of Saint Martin (now the chapel of Saint Roch), and work on the south side was begun with the Lady Chapel and the chapel of Saint Michael, above which was built a belltower over 57 metres high, which also served as a watch-tower. This was finished in about 1320.

During the rule of bishop Bernard Gui (1324-1331), formerly Grand Inquisitor, construction halted because of financial difficulties. The north and south sides were not completed and vaulted until about 1345, when the lower half of the western front was also erected. Several epidemics of the Black Death followed by the Hundred Years' War interrupted further work, and the façade was not finished until sometime between 1413 and 1430, and fortified with a chemin de ronde and bartizans. The principal nave was vaulted at the same time. Towards the end of the 15th century the chapel of Saint Fulcran was enlarged and a baptistry added to the southwest.

=== Destruction and restorations ===
During the French Wars of Religion the cathedral was looted and severely damaged. Protestant troops blew up the four great pillars of the nave, causing the collapse of the arcades, the clerestory and the vaulting of the nave roof. The only parts that remained intact were the choir, the outside walls of the nave and the side-chapels. It was Bishop Jean VI de Plantavit de la Pause (1625-1648) who had the destroyed parts of the building restored as they had been.

In the French Revolution the cathedral was desecrated and used as a storage depot. In the 19th and 20th centuries a number of restorations were carried out, including the reinforcement of the buttresses, the replacement of the original plaster and the reopening of blocked windows. Finally a stone roof was added to the belltower.

== Sculptures ==
The belltower is decorated with four, large statues in high relief, representing the saints venerated in the diocese: Saint Michael the Archangel; Saint Genesius of Arles, the first patron of the cathedral; either Saint Florus, the legendary first bishop of Lodève and the apostle of the Auvergne, or Saint Amand, bishop of Rodez; and Saint Fulcran, bishop of Lodève in the 10th century and the present patron of the cathedral. The cathedral building is also ornamented with quantities of sculpted brackets, capitals and gargoyles. The tympanum over the portal is Gothic revival.

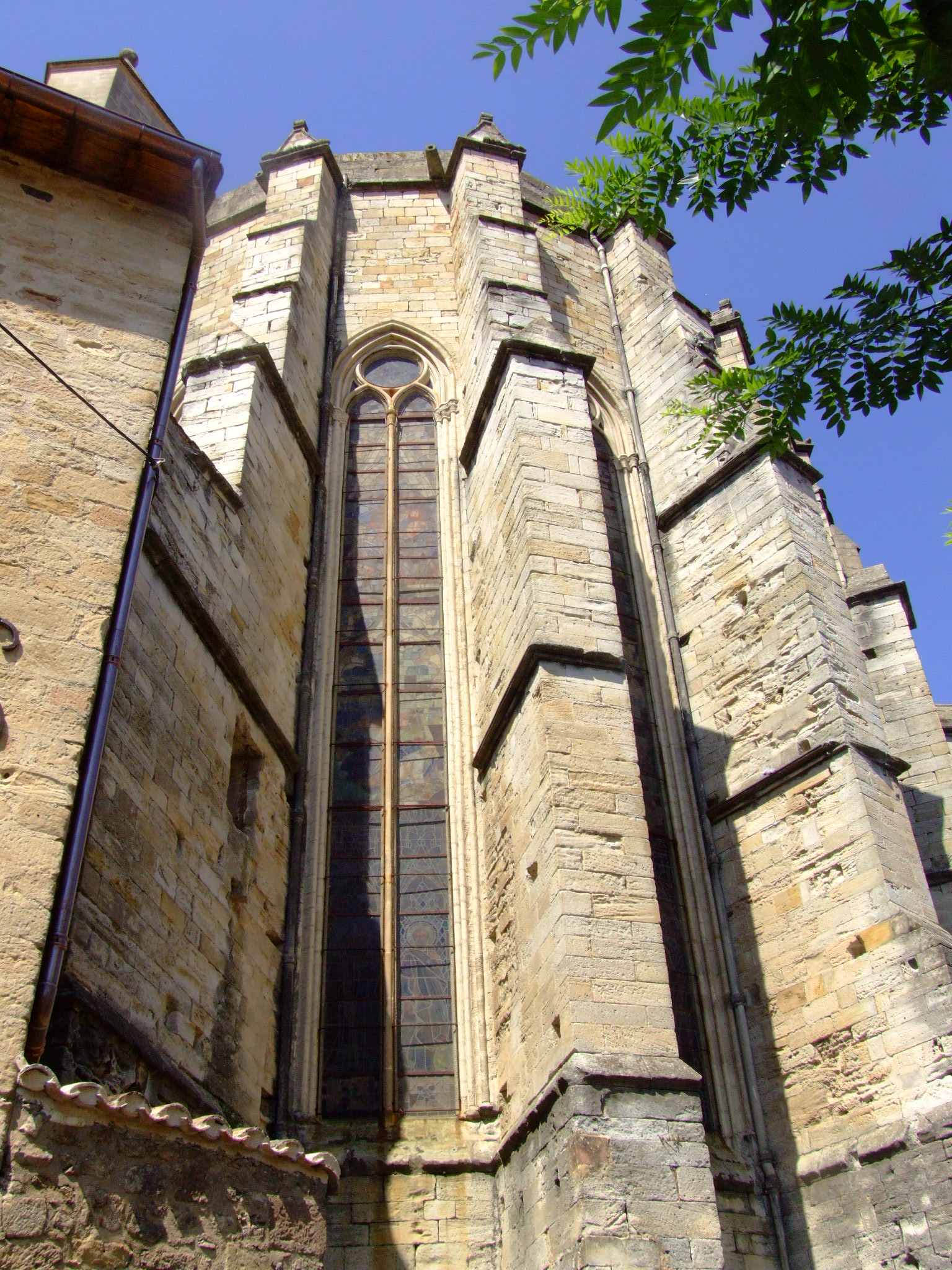
Buttresses.

== Furnishings ==
Because of the devastations of war, none of the original fittings and furnishings have survived. The chapel of Saint Michael contains the monument of Bishop Plantavit de la Pause (about 1650). The walls of the choir are decorated with eight enormous wall-hangings from the 17th and 18th centuries, by Sébastien Bourdon, J. Coustou and Étienne Loys. The stained glass windows of the apse date from 1854 and are by the artist Mauvernay. The wooden pulpit is supported by four atlantes (Cain, Holophernes, Herod and Judas) and dates from 1867, when it was displayed at the Exposition Universelle in Paris. The polychrome organ loft is a masterpiece of Rococo work, one of the most impressive in the south of France. It stands on a vast platform of stone with a beautiful balustrade of wrought iron, and was built in 1754 by Jean-François L'Epine. The original instrument was rebuilt in 1882 by Théodore Puget of Toulouse.

== Images ==
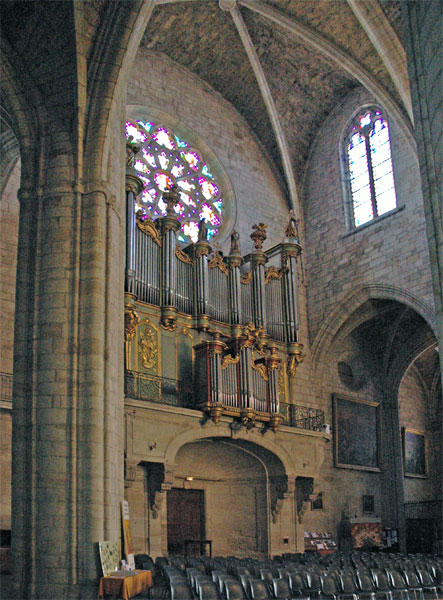
The organs

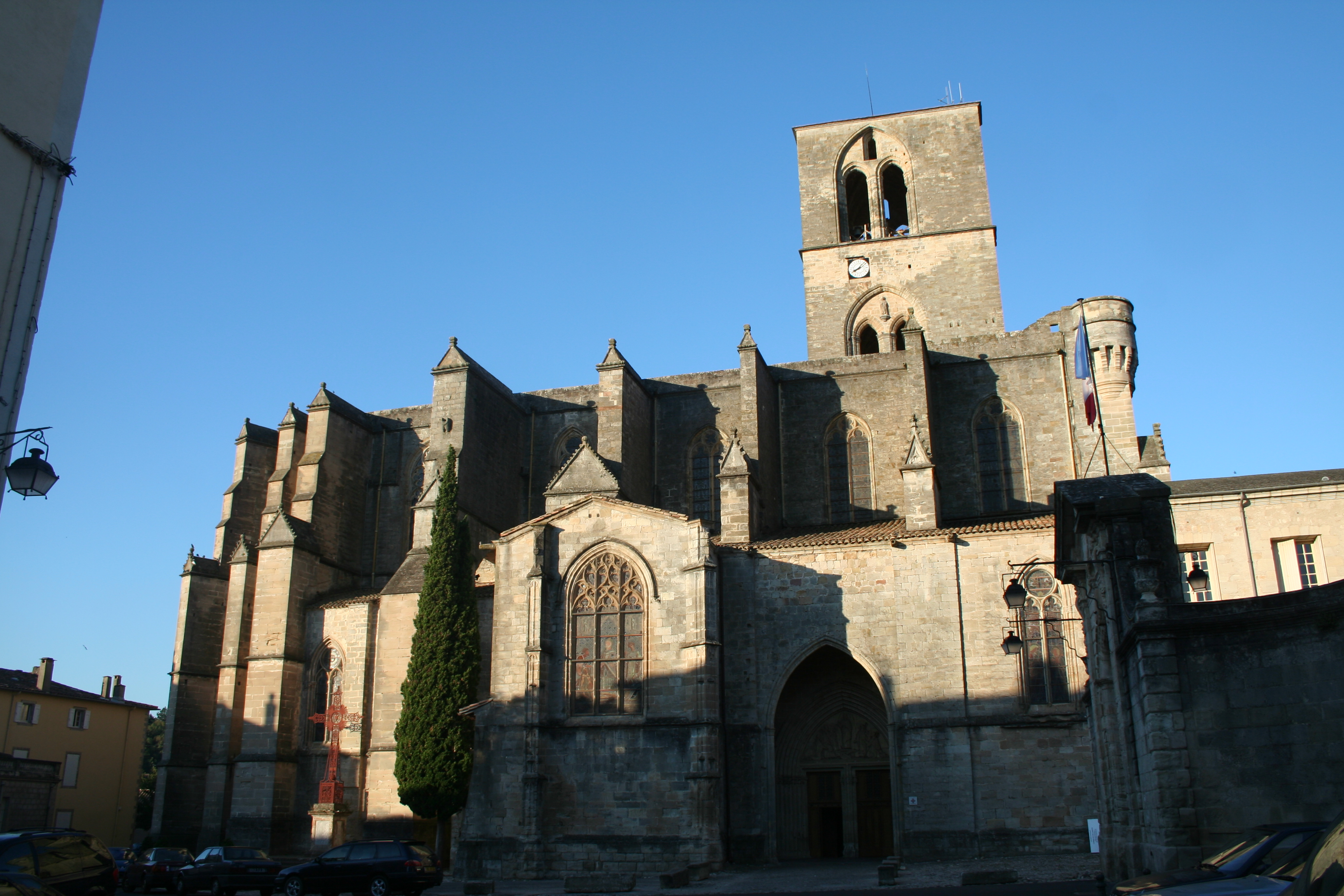
General view

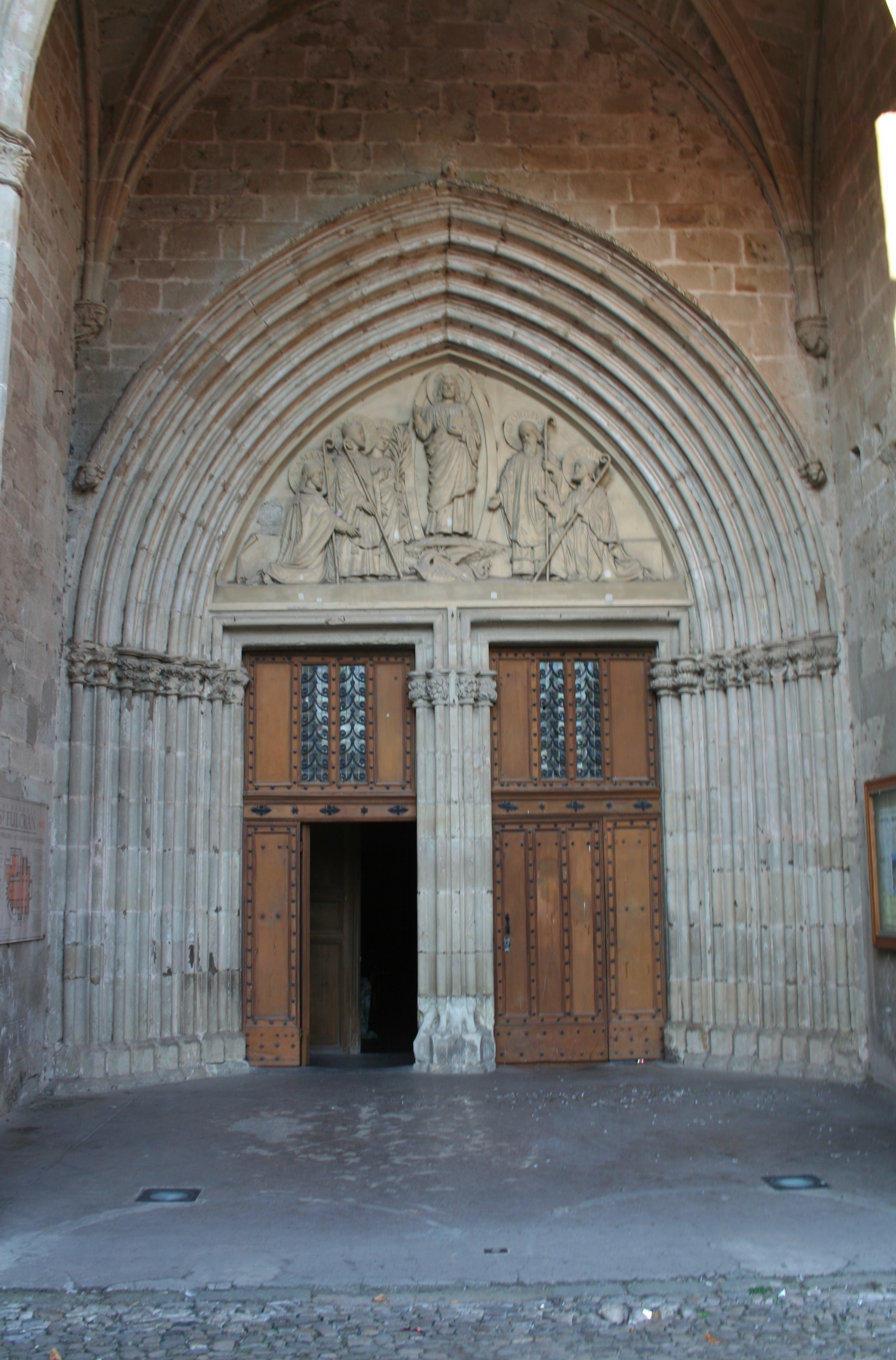
Portal

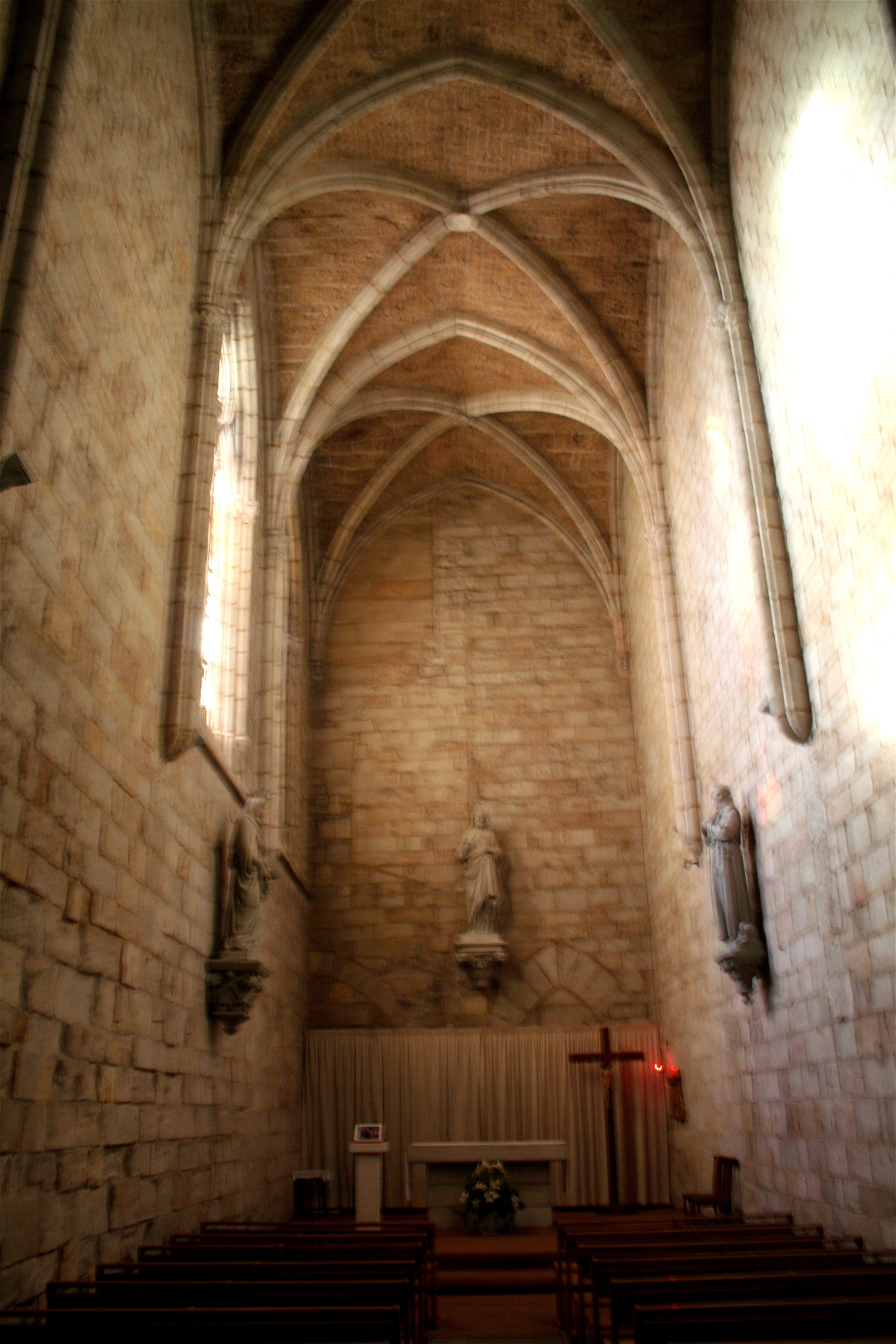
Chapel of the Sacred Heart

== Bibliography ==
- Pérouse de Montclos, Jean-Marie, 1996: Le guide du Patrimoine : Languedoc, Roussillon (pp. 274–276). Paris: Ministère de la Culture, Hachette ISBN 2-01-242333-7
- Curtius, Andreas, 2002: Die Kathedrale von Lodève und die Entstehung der languedokischen Gotik. Hildesheim: Olms ISBN 3-487-11486-0
