= Lauroux =

- Commune
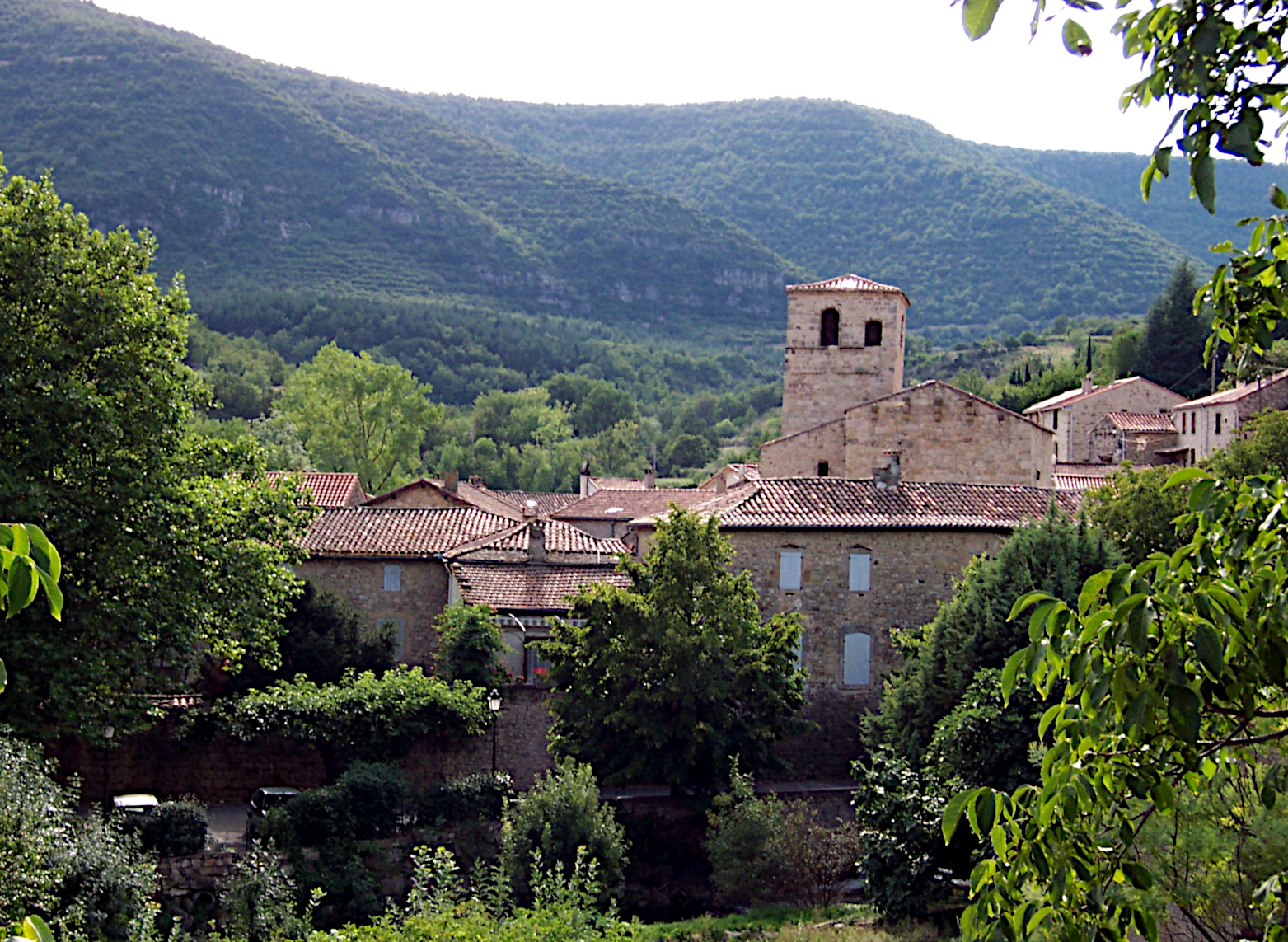
- A general view of Lauroux
- Location of Lauroux
- Location within France Location within Occitanie
- Coordinates: 43°46′43″N 3°17′24″E
- Country: France
- Region: Occitania
- Department: Hérault
- Arrondissement: Lodève
- Canton: Lodève

Government
  - Mayor (2020–2026): Jean-Paul Pailhoux
- Area^{1}: 26.42 km^{2} (10.20 sq mi)
- Elevation: 310 m (1,020 ft)
- Highest elevation: 845 m (2,772 ft)
- Lowest elevation: 212 m (696 ft)
- Population (2023): 214
  - Density: 8.10/km^{2} (21.0/sq mi)
- Time zone: UTC+01:00 (CET)
  - Summer (DST): UTC+02:00 (CEST)
- INSEE/Postal code: 34132 /34700
- ^{1} French Land Register data, which excludes lakes, ponds, glaciers > 1 km^{2} (0.386 sq mi or 247 acres) and river estuaries.

Lauroux (French pronunciation: [loʁu]; Occitan: Laurós) is a commune in the Hérault département in the Occitanie region in southern France.

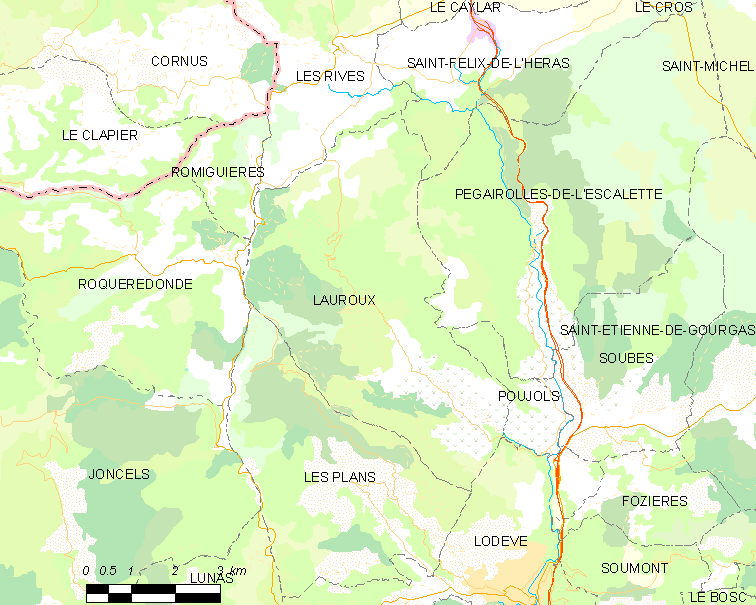
Map

== History ==
The Dominican inquisitor Bernardus Guidonis died in the castle.

== Population ==
Historical population
Year	Pop.	±% p.a.
1968	140	—
1975	151	+1.09%
1982	152	+0.09%
1990	149	−0.25%
1999	172	+1.61%
2007	198	+1.78%
2012	199	+0.10%
2017	200	+0.10%
2023	214	+1.13%
Source: INSEE

== See also ==
- Communes of the Hérault department
