= Bernard Gui =

French Roman Catholic bishop (1260s–1331)

- Bishop of Lodève
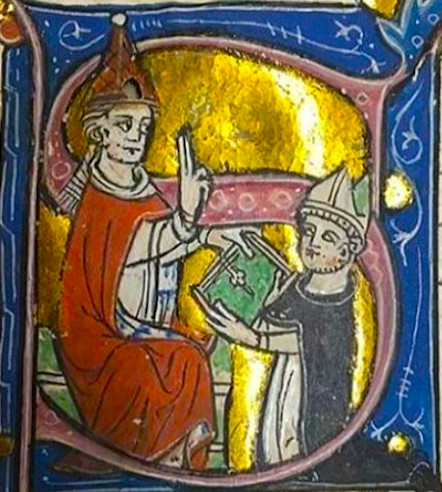
- 14th-century illustration of Gui receiving a blessing from Pope John XXII
- Church: Catholic Church
- Diocese: Lodève
- Installed: 1324
- Predecessor: Jean I. de Tixerandrerie
- Successor: Bernard VII. Dumas

Personal details
- Born: Bernatz Gui; 1261 or 1262 Royères, Viscounty of Limoges, Kingdom of France
- Died: 30 December 1331 Lauroux, Languedoc, Kingdom of France
- Buried: Church of Sainte-Marie, Limoges
- Bishop of Tui
- Installed: 26 August 1323
- Term ended: October 1324
- Predecessor: Juan Fernández de Sotomayor
- Successor: Rodrigo Ibáñez

Bernard Gui (French: [ɡi]), also known as Bernardo Gui or Bernardus Guidonis (c. 1261/62 – 30 December 1331), was a Limousin Dominican friar, Bishop of Lodève, and a papal inquisitor during the later stages of the Medieval Inquisition.

== Biography ==
Most extant detail about Gui's early life is derived from a short vita believed to have been written by his nephew, Pierre Gui, as part of a limited and ultimately unsuccessful campaign for Gui's sainthood.

Gui was born circa 1261 or 1262 in the hamlet of Royères in the Limousin region in what today is France. He entered the Dominican monastery at Limoges as a novice in the early 1270s and was received into the order by the prior of Limoges, Stephen of Salanhac, on 16 September 1280. Gui then spent the following decade studying grammar, logic, philosophy (particularly the writings of Aristotle), and theology at Dominican studia (houses of study) across southern France, including the studium generale at Montpellier.

Following the completion of his education Gui undertook a number of administrative roles at Dominican houses across southern France: he was appointed sublector of Limoges in 1291, and prior of Albi in 1294, before going on to serve in the same capacity at Carcassonne in 1297, Castres in 1301, and Limoges in 1305.

Between 1316 and 1320 Gui acted as Procurator General of the Dominican Order, representing its interests within Pope John XXII's court at Avignon, and during this time he also undertook diplomatic missions on behalf of the papacy. In January 1317, accompanied by the Franciscan Bertrand de la Tour, he was sent on a papal mission to Italy to instigate peace negotiations between the cities of northern Italy and Tuscany. Following their return to Avignon early in 1318, the two were sent to Flanders to mediate in the conflict between King Philip V of France and the Count of Flanders, Robert III. Both efforts were ultimately unsuccessful. Pierre Gui's hagiography claims that while in Avignon, Gui also performed two miracles, curing the inquisitor of Barcelona, Arnaldus Borgueti's insomnia and the friar Guillermus de Gardaga's fever and dysentery.

Gui was made Bishop of Tui on 26 August 1323, although his inquisitorial activities meant he was largely absent from the see, and Bishop of Lodève in October 1324. He died in his episcopal residence at Lauroux castle on 30 December 1331, and following his funeral in Lodève Cathedral his body was transported to Limoges to be buried in the church of the Dominican monastery. However, his tomb was looted during the late-sixteenth-century Wars of Religion.

== Inquisitorial career ==
Between 1307 and 1323, at the behest of Pope Clement V and Pope John XXII, Gui served as the chief inquisitor of Toulouse, publicly styling himself as 'Friar Bernard Gui, of the Order of Preachers, inquisitor of heretical depravity delegated to the kingdom of France by the apostolic authority'. He also assisted the inquisitors of Carcassonne, Geoffrey of Ablis and his successor Beaune, and the bishop of Pamiers, Jacques Fournier (later Pope Benedict XII). Gui's inquisitorial work took place in the Languedoc, a region that remained a "stronghold of heresy", in particular Catharism, despite the church's repeated efforts in the area throughout the thirteenth century (such as the Albigensian Crusade of 1209–1229).

In this capacity Gui travelled the region, meeting with local clergy and officials, publicly preaching about the danger of heretical teachings, and inviting those guilty of heretical sins to voluntarily confess in exchange for light penance. He then interrogated those who had been accused of heretical activity by penitents but failed to come forward voluntarily, with the secular authorities enlisted to apprehend and, if necessary, torture the accused. (A papal bull of 1252 permitted torture in cases in which there were "enough partial proofs to indicate that a full proof—a confession—was likely, and no other full proofs were available", although "a confession made after or under torture had to be freely repeated the next day without torture or it would have been considered invalid".)

The inquisitor would then hold a 'general sermon' (sermo generalis), assembling the local populace and publicly declaring the names of those judged guilty of the sin of heresy and their concomitant penances. Typical penalties included fasting, scourging, pilgrimage, the confiscation of property, or the wearing of large yellow crosses (with "the arms of the crosses [to be] two-and-a-half fingers in breadth, two-and-a-half palms in height, and two palms in width") on the front and back of outer clothing. As canon law prohibited the clergy from spilling blood, those who refused to repent or who had relapsed into heresy were handed over to the secular authorities for punishment, typically execution by burning at the stake.

During his tenure Gui held eleven such 'general sermons' in the cathedral of St Stephen in Toulouse and the cemetery of St John the Martyr in Pamiers, at which he judged 627 individuals guilty of heresy. A further nine individuals were also judged guilty at smaller events. In total, the tribunals headed by Gui convicted 636 individuals of 940 counts of heresy. In the nineteenth century the consensus among historians was that Gui had organised the burning of more than 600 individuals. However, more recent research has determined that no more than 45 of the individuals convicted by Gui (approximately 7% of the total) were executed, while 307 were imprisoned, 143 ordered to wear crosses, and nine sent on compulsory pilgrimages.

Janet Shirley states that Gui was "more interested in penitence than punishment" and generally sought to reconcile heretics to the Church. However, this interpretation has been challenged by James B. Given, who compares Gui's rates of execution unfavourably to those of secular courts in France, England, and Italy. Furthermore, based on a close reading of Gui's inquisitorial texts, Karen Sullivan has argued that he "rank[ed] among the more zealous of inquisitors" in his thought, if not actions, claiming that Gui was motivated more by a desire to safeguard the wider church community from heresy than a concern for the salvation of the individual accused heretic.

In the early fourteenth century inquisitorial activities were also characterised by increased attention to unconverted Jews, and in 1319 Gui arranged for copies of the Talmud to be publicly burnt in Toulouse, a tactic commonly used by Dominican inquisitors. Gui was also charged with investigating the lepers' plot of 1321, an alleged well poisoning conspiracy by French lepers, Jews, and Muslims; and provided an account of the event in the Flores chronicorum.

Gui was succeeded as chief inquisitor of Toulouse by Pierre Brun in July 1324.

== Works ==
Gui was one of the most prolific Latin authors of the Late Middle Ages, although he rarely wrote original works, preferring instead to compile and arrange existing texts, anecdotes, and records. He ordered the construction of a library at Limoges to accommodate over one hundred volumes; this was completed in 1306 and represented "one of the earliest efforts in the West to build a room devoted especially to the preservation of books".

The Dominican monastery at Limoges had been a "centre for historical study" for over a century, and Gui compiled numerous works of history (referred to by Gui as 'chronography'). These included the Flores chronicorum, a universal history from the birth of Christ to Gui's death in 1331, and various local histories, including accounts of the saints of Limousin (Traité sur les saints du Limousin), the abbey of Limoges (Traité sur l'histoire de l'abbaye de St. Augustin de Limoges), the priors of Grandmont (Chronique des prieurs de Grandmont) and L'Artige (Chronique des prieurs de l'Artige), and the bishops of Toulouse (Chronique des évêques de Toulouse) and Limoges (Catalogue des Évêques de Limoges). Additionally, he completed and significantly expanded the De Quator in quibus Deus Praedicatorum ordinem insignivit, a historical treatise on the Dominican Order begun in the 1270s by Stephen of Salanhac, and uncompleted at the time of the latter's death in 1291. This was largely completed by 1311, although Gui continued to make minor additions until his death.

Gui also compiled the Chronique des rois de France in 1313, an illustrated genealogy of the kings of France. This included the Arbor genealogiae regum francorum, one of the earliest known examples of a family tree, which was widely reproduced. He also contributed his literary energies to the campaign for the canonisation of Thomas Aquinas, producing the hagiography Vita Sancti Thomae Aquinatis (based largely on extant works by William of Tocco) in 1318 and a catalogue of his works in 1320. He probably attended the canonisation ceremony in Avignon in July 1323.

However, Gui's best-known works are those related to his inquisitorial career: Liber sententiarum, a comprehensive register of the sentences he delivered, and Practica inquisitionis heretice pravitatis, a comprehensive inquisitor's manual. Inquisitors had no standardised or formal training, although they were often educated in theology or law, and practical guides to inquisitorial activities emerged as a distinct literary genre in the late twelfth century. Gui's manual consisted of five books: the first three were formularies, providing templates to be used to deliver sentences during 'general sermons', and the fourth reproduced documents outlining and confirming the powers of the inquisitor (such as papal and conciliar legislation, and royal decrees). The fifth and most famous book provided descriptions of the beliefs and practices of heretics such as Cathars (referred to as 'modern Manicheans'), Waldensians, Pseudo-Apostles, Beguines, and relapsed Jews, in addition to guidance for inquisitors on the best methods of interrogation for each group (including advocating torture if necessary). This was the first inquisitor's manual to refer specifically to penalties for relapsed Jews.

The exact date of the text's composition is unclear, but Janet Shirley suggests a completion date of early 1324 at the latest. The manual was based on Gui's practical experience, but it also relied heavily on the writings of others for subjects in which he had little experience; for example, his description of the Waldensians includes passages lifted directly from Stephen of Bourbon's Tractatus de diversis materiis predicabilibus and David of Augsburg's De inquisitione hereticorum. Gui's text was one of the most widely copied and read inquisitorial manuals during the medieval period, superseded only by the Catalan inquisitor Nicholas Eymerich's fourteenth-century Directorium Inquisitorum, and heavily influenced later inquisitorial practice. Six manuscripts of the work survive, located in the archives of Toulouse, the Vatican Library, the British Museum, and the Bibliothèque Nationale in Paris. The first printed edition was published in 1886, when the text was translated to French by the Bishop of Beauvais, Marie-Jean-Celestin Douais.

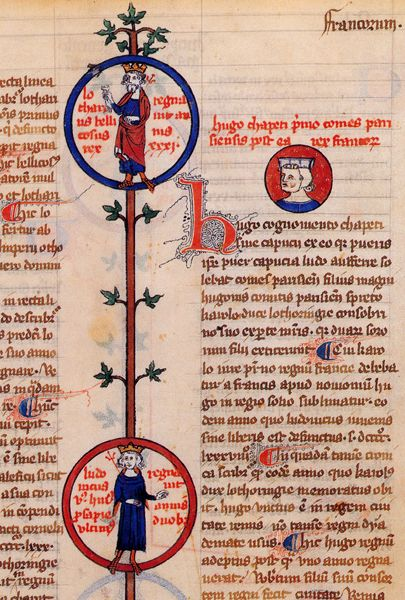
Illustrations from a copy of Gui's Arbor genealogiae regum francorum produced in the 1330s, showing the Carolingian kings Lothair and Louis V

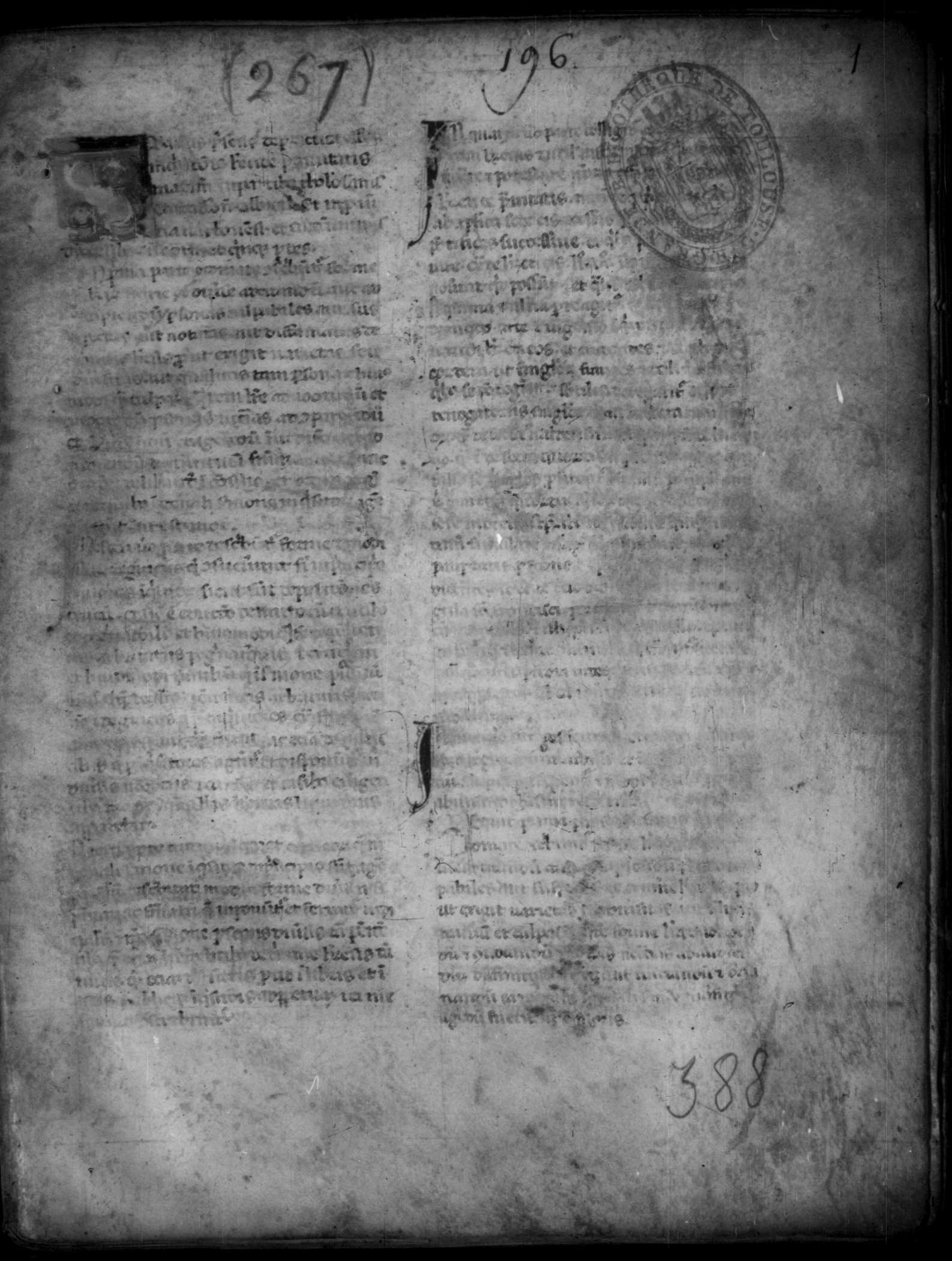
Practica officii inquisitionis heretice pravitatis, manuscript, 14th century. Toulouse, Bibliothèque d'Etude et du Patrimoine, Fonds Manuscrits, Ms 388.

== Popular culture ==
A fictionalised Gui features as a secondary antagonist in the best-selling 1980 historical novel The Name of the Rose (Il nome della rosa) by Italian scholar and cultural critic Umberto Eco; the book has been translated into more than thirty languages and sold over fifty million copies. Gui was portrayed by American actor F. Murray Abraham in the 1986 film adaptation, and by British actor Rupert Everett in an eight-part 2019 television adaptation. As a consequence of the reassessment of the historical figure in the years subsequent to publication of the original novel, the character has been criticised by historians as historically inaccurate. Edward Peters has stated that the character is "rather more sinister and notorious ... than [Gui] ever was historically", and John Aberth has branded the depiction of Gui as a "pyromaniac madman" as a "horrible distortion of history"; and have argued that the character resembles more closely the caricatures of Catholic inquisitors and prelates in eighteenth- and nineteenth-century Gothic literature, such as Matthew Gregory Lewis's The Monk (1796), than the historical Gui.

Gui also appears as an antagonist in David Blixt's 2012 novel Fortune's Fool, where he tries Pietro Alighieri, son of Dante, for heresy and impiety. There is an implied reference to Eco's novel.

Due to his fictionalised portrayals in modern popular culture, most notably The Name of the Rose, he is "perhaps the most famous of all medieval inquisitors", although among his contemporaries and modern historians he is more often noted for his accomplishments in administration, diplomacy, and historical writing.

== Sources ==
- Aberth, John (2003). A Knight at the Movies: Medieval History on Film. London: Routledge. ISBN 9781135257279. OCLC 815653206.
- Arnold, John H.; Biller, Peter, eds. (2016). Heresy and Inquisition in France, 1200–1300. Manchester: Manchester University Press. ISBN 9780719081316. OCLC 920541464.
- Bailey, Michael D. (2006). "Gui, Bernard (ca. 1261–1331)". In Golden, Richard M. (ed.). Encyclopedia of Witchcraft: The Western Tradition. California: ABC-CLIO. ISBN 978-1576072431. OCLC 62089799.
- Barber, Malcolm (1981). "Lepers, Jews and Moslems: The plot to overthrow Christendom in 1321". History. 66 (216): 1–17. doi:10.1111/j.1468-229x.1981.tb01356.x. ISSN 0018-2648. PMID 11614633.
- Caldwell, Christine Ames (2009). Righteous Persecution: Inquisition, Dominicans, and Christianity in the Middle Ages. Philadelphia: University of Pennsylvania Press. ISBN 978-0812201093. OCLC 858934931.
- Dane, Joseph A. (1989). "Inquisitorial Hermeneutics and the Manual of Bernard Gui". Tenso. 4 (2): 59–76. doi:10.1353/ten.1989.0005. ISSN 1944-0146.
- Ganim, John M. (2009). "Medieval noir: anatomy of a metaphor". In Bernau, Anke; Bildhauer, Bettina (eds.). Medieval film. Manchester: Manchester University Press. ISBN 9780719077029. OCLC 313645262.
- Given, James B. (1989). "The Inquisitors of Languedoc and the Medieval Technology of Power". The American Historical Review. 94 (2): 336–359. doi:10.1086/ahr/94.2.336.
- Given, James B. (1996). "A Medieval Inquisitor at Work: Bernard Gui, 3 March 1308 to 16 June 1323". In Cohn Jr., Samuel K.; Epstein, Steven A. (eds.). Portraits of Medieval and Renaissance Living: Essays in Memory of David Herlihy. Ann Arbor: University of Michigan Press. ISBN 9780472106714. OCLC 473320832.
- Guenée, Bernard (1991). Between Church and State: The lives of four French prelates in the late Middle Ages. Translated by Goldhammer, Arthur. Chicago: University of Chicago Press. ISBN 978-0226310329. OCLC 21446817.
- Gui, Bernard (2006). The Inquisitor's Guide: A Medieval Manual on Heretics. Translated by Shirley, Janet. Welwyn Garden City: Ravenhall Books. ISBN 978-1905043095. OCLC 67375516.
- O'Neill, John Philip (1996). Enamels of Limoges: 1100–1350. New York: Metropolitan Museum of Art. ISBN 978-0870997587. OCLC 34338387.
- Peters, Edward (1988). Inquisition. Berkeley: University of California Press. ISBN 978-0520066304. OCLC 18683092.
- Sullivan, Karen (2011). The Inner Lives of Medieval Inquisitors. Chicago: University of Chicago Press. ISBN 9780226781662. OCLC 712599139.
