= Lodève =

Subprefecture of Hérault, Occitanie

- Subprefecture and commune
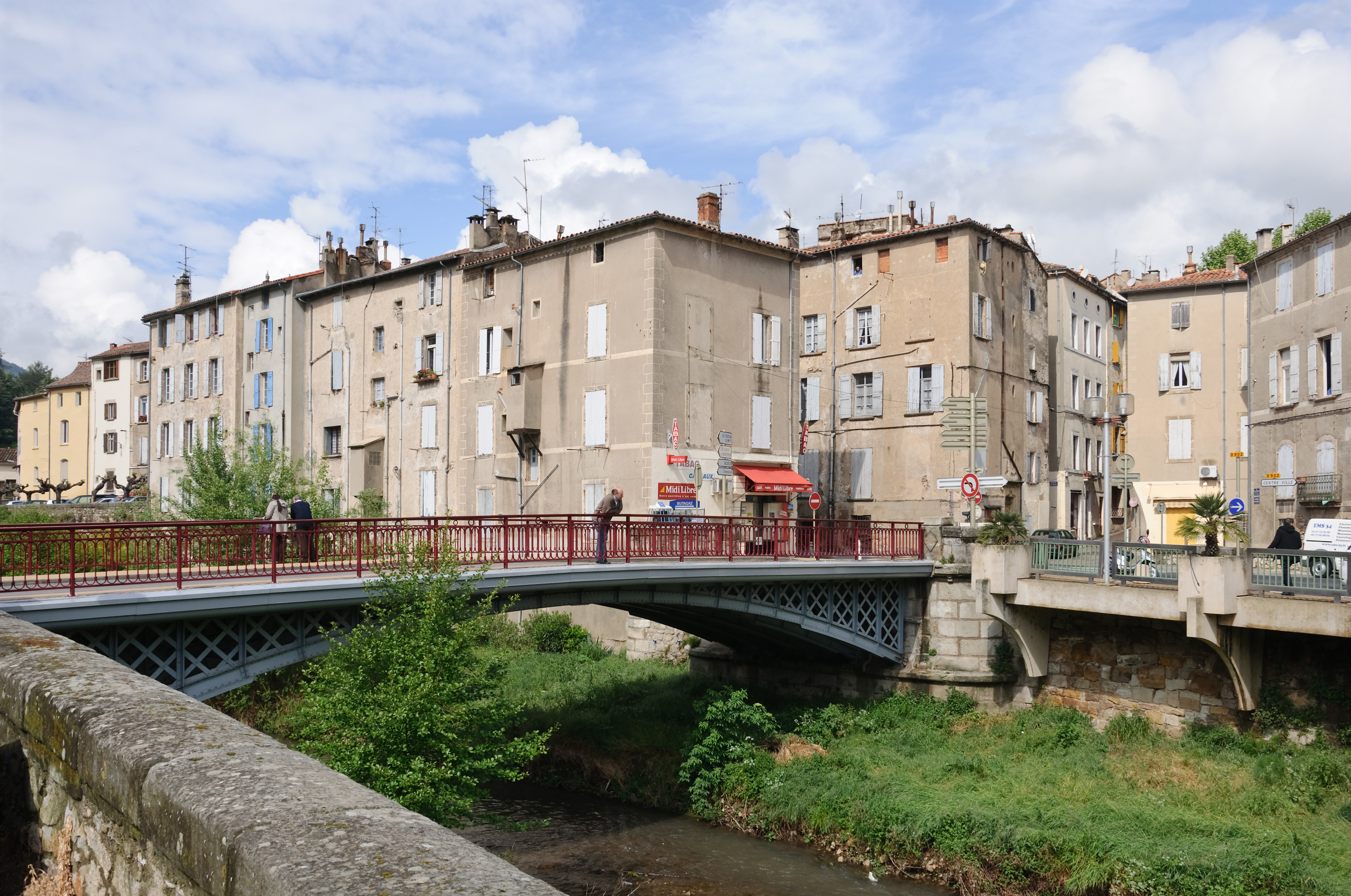
- The iron bridge in Lodève

- Coat of arms
- Location of Lodève
- Location within France Location within Occitanie
- Coordinates: 43°43′57″N 3°19′13″E
- Country: France
- Region: Occitania
- Department: Hérault
- Arrondissement: Lodève
- Canton: Lodève
- Intercommunality: Lodévois et Larzac

Government
  - Mayor (2020–2026): Gaëlle Lévêque (PS)
- Area^{1}: 23.17 km^{2} (8.95 sq mi)
- Elevation: 165 m (541 ft)
- Highest elevation: 700 m (2,300 ft)
- Lowest elevation: 117 m (384 ft)
- Population (2023): 7,251
  - Density: 312.9/km^{2} (810.5/sq mi)
- Demonym(s): Lodévois, Lodévoise
- Time zone: UTC+01:00 (CET)
  - Summer (DST): UTC+02:00 (CEST)
- INSEE/Postal code: 34142 /34700
- Website: http://www.lodeve.com
- ^{1} French Land Register data, which excludes lakes, ponds, glaciers > 1 km^{2} (0.386 sq mi or 247 acres) and river estuaries.

Lodève (French pronunciation: [lodɛv]; Occitan: Lodeva, [luˈðeβɔ]; Latin: Luteva) is a commune in the department of Hérault, in the region of Occitania, southern France. It is a subprefecture of the department. The derivation of the city's name is from Gaulish Luteva, composed of lut-, swamp, mud + suffix -eva. It might therefore translate as the muddy place or the swamp city. This mud could be a clay, called argillite, which was use during ancient history to produce pottery.

== Geography ==
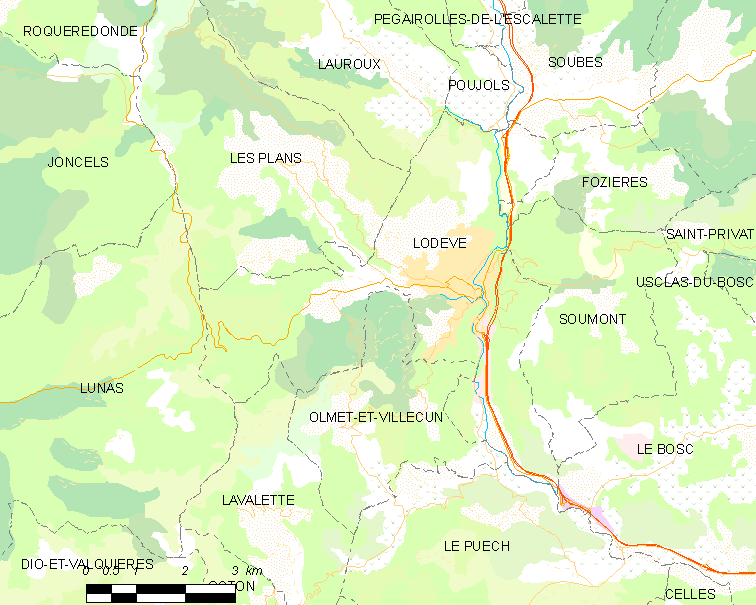
Map

Lodève lies where the coastal plain rises up to the Larzac plateau, 54 km (34 mi) from Montpellier, where the river Lergue and the smaller river Soulondre meet. Lodève is surrounded by green hills and vineyards and lies only 8 km (5.0 mi) from the large man-made Lac du Salagou.

== Climate ==
Lodève has a mostly mediterranean climate, with hot summers favourable to viticulture. Violent storms and torrential rain are frequently seen in late summer, leading to flooding and the muds and swamps that gave the city its name.

== History ==
Lodève started as the capital of a tribe of the Volcae, the Lutevani, before becoming the Roman city Luteva (also known as Forum Neronis). The town was a stopping point on the pilgrimage to Santiago de Compostela via the Arles road. From the 5th century until the French Revolution, it was the seat of the Bishops of Lodève. It was also a centre for textile production under Louis XV and was home to one of only two royal manufactories for tapestry, the other being the Gobelins in Paris.

More recently, the area was the centre of a firm resistance against the Nazi occupation during the Second World War.

== Sights ==
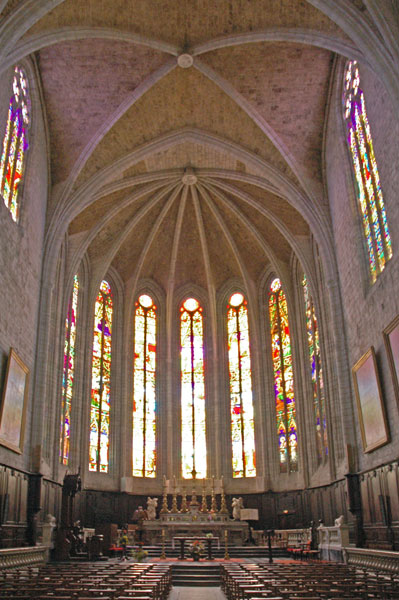
Stained glass in Lodève cathedral

- Lodève Cathedral (Cathédrale Saint-Fulcran de Lodève), parts of which date from the sixth century.
- Museum Fleury (temporary art exhibitions (mainly paintings) and a permanent archaeological collection).
- Halle Dardé, dedicated to local sculptor Paul Dardé.
- L'Atelier national du tapis de Lodève, the French state carpet-making workshop (visits arranged by Tourist Office, Lodève).

In the vicinity:

- Cave: Grotte de Labeil.
- Saint-Michel de Grandmont Priory and its dolmen.
- Lerab Ling: Buddhist Temple in traditional Tibetan form.

== Culture ==
Throughout the year, the town hosts a programme of cultural and sporting events, as well as all sorts of markets. In recent years, the Museum Art Gallery has gained national acclaim for its major art exhibitions.

The "Voix de la Méditerranée" poetry festival, established in 1998, takes place every July for around 9 days, and involves poets, musicians and writers from many different countries on the Mediterranean.

The annual "Fête de St. Fulcran", the patron saint of the town, takes place in May and includes the procession of the saint's relics and a funfair.

== Population ==
Lodève has a fairly large Algerian (see pied noir, harki) population, the first generation of which fought for the French and were housed here after the Algerian War of Independence.

Historical population

Year	Pop.	±% p.a.
1793	7,906	—
1800	7,449	−0.85%
1806	8,317	+1.85%
1821	9,056	+0.57%
1831	9,919	+0.91%
1836	11,208	+2.47%
1841	10,477	−1.34%
1846	10,718	+0.46%
1851	11,238	+0.95%
1856	12,765	+2.58%
1861	11,864	−1.45%
1866	10,571	−2.28%
1872	9,464	−1.83%
1876	10,528	+2.70%
1881	10,185	−0.66%
1886	9,532	−1.32%
1891	9,060	−1.01%
1896	8,416	−1.46%
1901	8,200	−0.52%

Year	Pop.	±% p.a.
1906	7,395	−2.05%
1911	7,668	+0.73%
1921	6,508	−1.63%
1926	6,629	+0.37%
1931	7,020	+1.15%
1936	6,135	−2.66%
1946	6,242	+0.17%
1954	6,426	+0.36%
1962	6,869	+0.84%
1968	7,556	+1.60%
1975	7,910	+0.66%
1982	8,378	+0.82%
1990	7,602	−1.21%
1999	6,900	−1.07%
2007	7,329	+0.76%
2012	7,552	+0.60%
2017	7,441	−0.30%
2023	7,251	−0.43%

Source: EHESS and INSEE (1968-2023)

== Transportation ==
The town lies on the A75 autoroute about 30 minutes south of the new Millau viaduct, the highest bridge in the world.

== Personalities ==
Lodève was the birthplace of:

- André-Hercule de Fleury (1653-1743), a cardinal who served as the chief minister of Louis XV. Lodève's municipal museum is named after him.
- Jean Louis Conneau aka André Beaumont (1880-1937), pioneer aviator.
- Georges Auric (1899-1983), composer.
- Paul Dardé (1888-1963), sculptor. The middle school is named after him.
- Joseph Vallot (1854 – 1925), the alpinist who installed an observatory on Mont Blanc. Lodève's high school is named after him.

== Economy ==
The town houses a famous carpet-manufacturing company, part of the national Savonnerie, which once supplied carpets to the French royal family, and still today produces hand-made carpets for State buildings.

Viticulture, focussed on the Carignan grape variety, is a major industry. The climate is also favourable for fruit production, and the region's peaches, apricots, melons and tomatoes are prized.

== International relations ==
Lodève is twinned with South Kirkby and Moorthorpe, UK and Gjakova, Kosovo.

== See also ==
- Communes of the Hérault department
