= Diocese of Lodève =

Former Roman Catholic diocese in southern France

Coordinates: 43.73°N 3.32°E

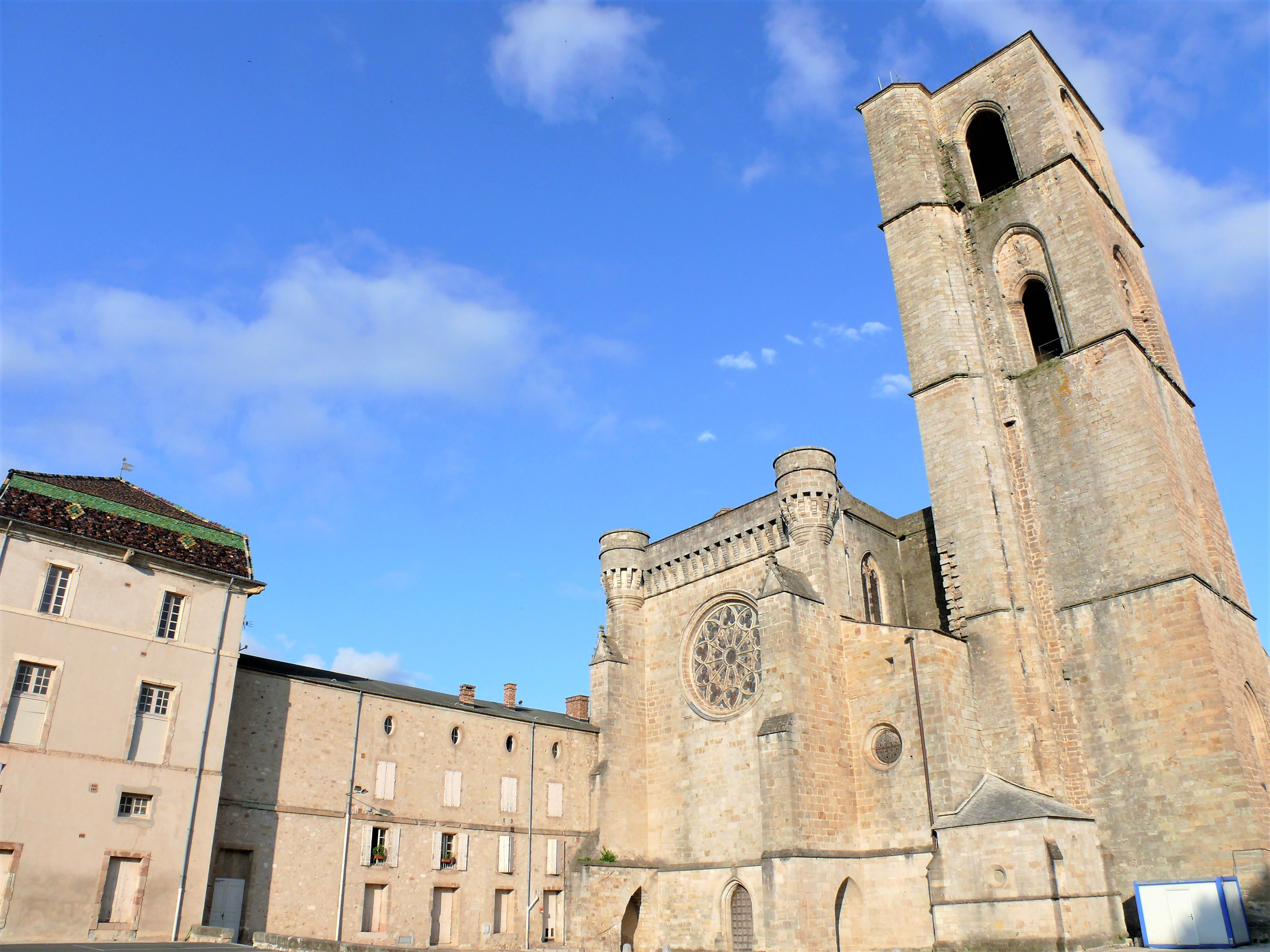
Lodève Cathedral

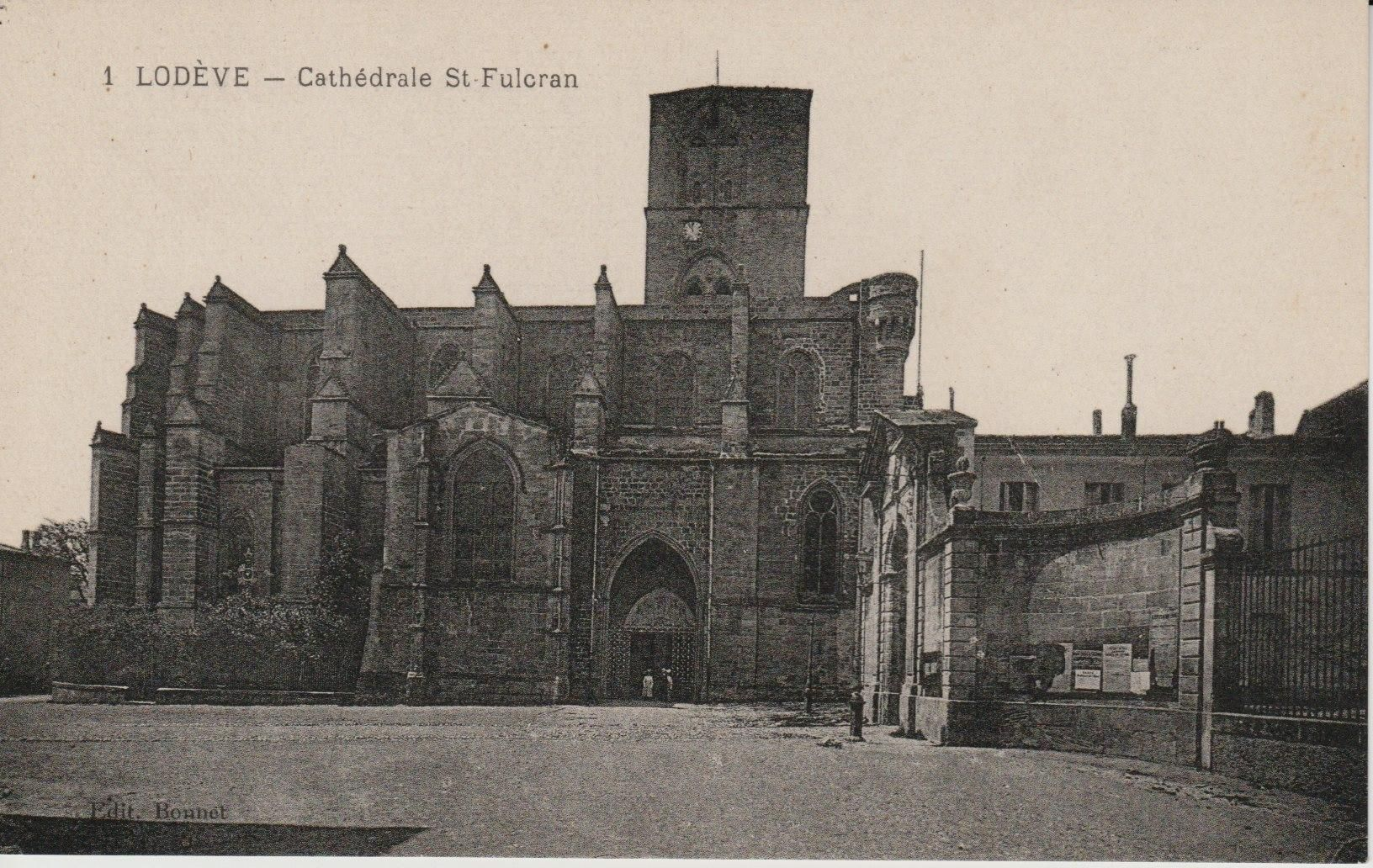
Former cathedral of Saint-Fulcran

The Bishopric of Lodève is a former Roman Catholic diocese in southern France. Its episcopal see was located in Lodève, in the modern department of Hérault. It was a suffragan diocese in the ecclesiastical province of Narbonne. In 1790, the diocese was suppressed by the National Constituent Assembly, and in 1801 by Pope Pius VII. Its territory is now part of the archdiocese of Montpellier.

The seat of the bishop was in the cathedral of Saint Genesius (Saint Genès), dedicated in 975.

== History ==
A local tradition, found in the 14th century, has made Florus of Lodève the first bishop of Lodève, and relates that as a disciple of St. Peter, he afterwards evangelized Haute-Auvergne and died in the present village of Saint-Flour. The legend is without foundation and unworthy of credit.

Bishops of Lodève are believed to have existed since 421. The first bishop known by name is Maternus, who was present at the Council of Agde in 506. The bishops of Lodève possessed the title of Comte de Montbrun. All the nobles in the diocese were his vassals and owed him an oath of fidelity.

Among the bishops of Lodève are: George of Lodève (863–884), who had been a Benedictine monk of Conques and then of Vabres, was granted the royalties (teloneum) of the city of Lodève by Charles the Bald. St. Fulcran (949–1006) in 975 dedicated the cathedral of St. Genès and founded the Abbey of St. Sauveur; The brothers Guillaume Briçonnet (1489–1516) and Denis Briçonnet (1516–1520). were sons of Cardinal Guillaume Briçonnet, who had been the principal minister of state of King Charles VIII of France; both father and sons participated in the false council of Pisa in 1511, against Pope Julius II.

In 1210, King Philip II confirmed the possessions and rights of the Church of Lodève, and granted the bishops full temporal and ecclesiastical jurisdiction. On 13 May 1302, King Philip IV confirmed the complete jurisdiction temporal and ecclesiastical, of the bishops of Lodève over the diocese of Lodève.

The Dominican inquisitor and historian, Bernard Gui (1324–1331), who had been Bishop of Tuy (Spain), was appointed Bishop of Lodève by Pope John XXII on 20 July 1324. He made his ceremonial entry on 15 October, the feast day of the dedication of the cathedral. He had notaries compile four volumes of the old documents concerning feudal grants and other privileges of the bishops; another volume entitled Registrum privilegiorum et ecclesiarum episcopatus Lodovensis; and a Cronica de episcopis Lodovensibus.

=== Chapter and Cathedral ===
The cathedral of Saint Genesius was served and administered by a corporation called the Chapter, consisting of thirteen canons, including the dignities of archdeacon, sacristan, precentor, and archpriest. In May 1336, Bishop Bernard Gui(donis) changed the dignity of archpriest into the office of archpriest and vicar general, with the care of souls, though still retaining his place in the choir and his vote in the Chapter. In 1625, there were three dignities and nine canons. In 1690 and in 1750, three dignities and twelve canons are recorded. Bishop Pierre de la Treille (1430–1441) and the Chapter agreed on a set of statutes for the Chapter in 1440.

In 1573, the cathedral was invaded by Huguenots, and the body of Bishop Fulcran was removed from its tomb in the chapel of S. Michel in the bell tower, drug through the streets, and burned; what was left was thrown in the river. One of his hands, it was said, was rescued by faithful Catholics, and it was seen to work miracles.

=== Bishop Christophe de Lestang ===
Christophe de Lestang (L'Estaing), had been a page and then a protégé of Cardinal René de Birague, Chancellor of France since 1570. On 28 November 1580, at the age of 20, he was made bishop of Lodève by papal dispensation of Pope Gregory XIII. Lestang made it his mission to destroy the power of the Protestants in Languedoc, for which he was given an annual grant of 12,000 ecus by King Henry III. His work brought him into great favor with the Catholic League. In May 1582, he was ordered by Henry de Montmorency, Governor of Languedoc, to tear down the great tower of the episcopal palace, including the prisons which had been built by Bishop Bernard de Gui, because it raised disquiet both among Huguenots and Catholics; the keys to the city gates were to be held by a Calvinist and a Catholic. In 1583, King Henri III personally informed the bishop that Duke Henri was trying to draw Languedoc away from obedience to himself. Working with and receiving funding from the Duke de Joyeuse, Bishop Lestang levied troops for the defense of Lodève, Clermont and other strategic places, actions which enraged Montmorency. He besieged Lodève in September 1585, and the bishop was forced to arrange a negotiated withdrawal, leaving the city to the duke. The bishop lived sometimes at Toulouse, sometimes at Narbonne. In 1586, Henri III granted him the right to live in the episcopal palace in Carcassonne and to enjoy the revenues of that diocese. In 1591 he was sent by the Catholic League to Spain, to thank King Philip II for his assistance, and to request its continuation. He then presided over the Estates of Toulouse in 1591, in cooperation with the Duke de Joyeuse. He presided over the Estates of the League again in 1596. Lestang was transferred to the diocese of Alet on 5 September 1594, but refused the transfer and never took possession of that diocese; the nomination came from Henry IV, whose excommunication was not lifted until 17 September 1595. Lestang's nephew, Pierre de Polverel, was appointed bishop of Alet on 19 February 1603. Lestang was named bishop of Carcassonne on 26 May 1603. He died on 11 August 1621.

=== Jansenists ===
Lodève had no seminary in the 17th century. Bishop François de Bosquet (1648–1655) installed the Congregation de la Doctrine Chretienne in the collège of Lodève, and sent candidates for the priesthood there, though there were courses neither in philosophy nor theology. Advanced priestly education could only be had in institutions in other dioceses, though the costs made this expedient difficult. Bishop Jean-Antoine de La Garde de Chambonas (1671–1690) had to organize monthly seminars in an effort to raise the quality of his clergy.

Bishop de Bosquet also became heavily involved in the Jansenist controversy of the Five Propositions. Pope Innocent X had written to his nuncio in Paris to have some bishops chosen who were conciliatory and well instructed. In 1653, Bosquet, who was a theologian and canonist, and had been friendly to some of the Jansenists, was chosen by Cardinal Mazarin, on the advice of Pierre de Marca, to travel to Rome and represent the ninety French bishops, who were seeking a resolution to the impasse between the Jansenist bishops and the Papacy. His first audience with Pope Innocent X took place on 2 January 1654. His ultimate successes in persuading the pope and the cardinal to agree, and the Jansenist bishops to submit to papal authority, brought him, on 4 June 1654, the title of Assistant at the Papal Throne. He returned to France in September 1654. On 10 July 1655, Bosquet was nominated by King Louis XIV (that is, by Cardinal Mazarin) to be Bishop of Montpellier; on 31 January 1656, Pope Innocent confirmed the appointment.

Bosquet's successor, Roger de Harlay (1657–1669) was doubtless far more sympathetic to Jansenism than he had ever been.

In 1698, the population of the diocese was approximately 26,700. In 1737, it was 28,364. Protestants formed a small minority, in the south-east part of the diocese.

=== French Revolution ===
The National Constituent Assembly ordered the replacement of political subdivisions of the ancien régime with subdivisions called "departments", to be characterized by a single administrative city in the center of a compact area. The decree was passed on 22 December 1789, and the boundaries fixed on 26 February 1790, with the effective date of 4 March 1790. A new department was created, called "Hérault", and its meeting center rotated among Montpellier, Béziers, Lodève, and Saint-Pons.

The National Constituent Assembly then, on 6 February 1790, instructed its ecclesiastical committee to prepare a plan for the reorganization of the clergy. At the end of May, its work was presented as a draft Civil Constitution of the Clergy, which, after vigorous debate, was approved on 12 July 1790. There was to be one diocese in each department, a policy later adhered to by Napoleon. Under the Civil Constitution of the Clergy, the seat of the Constitutional diocese of Hérault was fixed at Béziers, and the diocese of Lodève was consequently suppressed, its territory becoming part of the diocese of Hérault.

The French Directory fell in the coup engineered by Talleyrand and Napoleon on 10 November 1799. The coup resulted in the establishment of the French Consulate, with Napoleon as the First Consul. To advance his aggressive military foreign policy, he decided to make peace with the Catholic Church in France and with the Papacy. In the concordat of 1801 with Pope Pius VII, and in the enabling papal bull, "Qui Christi Domini", the constitutional diocese of Hérault and all the other dioceses in France, including the diocese of Lodève, were suppressed. This removed all the institutional contaminations and novelties introduced by the Constitutional Church, and voided all of the episcopal appointments of both authentic and constitutional bishops. In the new ecclesiastical structure authorized by Pius VII, the departments of Hérault and Tarn were assigned to the restored diocese of Montpellier, and Montpellier was made a suffragan of the metropolitan archbishop of Toulouse. Montpellier became an archdiocese on 8 December 2002.

A papal brief of Pope Pius IX, of 16 June 1877, authorized the bishops of Montpellier to call themselves bishops of Montpellier, Béziers, Agde, Lodève, and Saint-Pons (Saint-Pons-de-Thomières), in memory of the suppressed suffragan dioceses whose territories had at one time or another been added to the archbishopric of Montpellier.

== Bishops of Lodève ==
=== To 1000 ===
[ Florus of Lodève ? ]
[ Ranulphus ? ] 492

- Maternus 506
- Deuterius 535

[Edibius ? 557 ]

- Agrippinus 589
- Leonti(an)us 610
- Anatolius 633

[ Firmin 652 ]

- Ansemundus 683
- [ 694 : Eugenius ? ]
- [ 711 : Bernechaire ]
- [ 769 : Michel]

[ Nebridius ? ]

- Sisemond 817
- 824 :Sylvain
- [ 840 : Radulphus ]
- 844 :Tatila
- c. 863–c. 884 : George
- 884 : Macarius
- 906 : Antgiaire
- ? : Rodulphus
- 911–949 : Thierry
- 949–1006 ; Fulcran

=== 1000–1300 ===
- 1006–1015 : Mainfroi
- c. 1033 : Odo
- 1042–1049 : Bernard
- (1050) : Bernard (II.)
- 1054–ca. 1075 : Rostaing
- 1077–1099 : Bernard de Prévenchères
- 1100–1102 : Dieudonné de Caylus
- 1102–1154 : Pierre de Raymond
- 1155–1161 : Pierre II. de Posquières
- 1162–1182 : Gaucelin de Raymond de Montpeyroux
- 1162–1201 : Raymond Guilhem Madières
- 1200–1207 : Pierre (III.) de Frottier
- 1208–1238 : Pierre (IV.) de Lodève
- 1237–1241 : Bertrand de Mornas
- 1241–1259 : Guillaume de Cazouls
- 1259–1262 : Raymond (II.) de Bellin
- 1263–1280 : Raymond (III.) d'Astolphe de Rocozels
- 1280–1284 : Bérenger (I.) de Boussages
- 1285–1290 : Bérenger (II.) de Guitard
- 1290–1292 : Bernard (IV.) Poitevin
- 1292–1296 : Gaucelin de la Garde
- 1296–1302 : Ithier of Bordeaux, O.Min.

=== 1300–1500 ===
- 1302–1312 : Dieudonné de Boussages
- [ 1313–1313 : Bernard de Guitard ]
- 1313–1318 : Guillaume de Mandegot
- 1318–1322 : Jacques de Cabrerets de Coucots
- 1322–1324 : Jean de Tixerandrerie
- 1324–1331 : Bernard Gui
- 1332–1348 : Bernard Dumas
- 1348–1356 : Robert de la Vie
- 1357–1361 : Gilbert de Montdragon
- 1361–1370 : Aymeric d'Hugues
- 1370–1371 : Gui de Malsec
- 1371–1374 : Jean (II.) Gastel
- 1374–1382 : Ferry Cassinel
- 1382–1385 : Pierre Girard Avignon Obedience
- 1385–1392 : Clément de Grammont Avignon Obedience
- 1392–1398 : Guillaume (IV.) de Grimoard Avignon Obedience
- 1399–1413 : Jean de la Vergne Avignon Obedience
- 1413–1430 : Micuel Le Boeuf
- 1430–1441 : Pierre de la Treille
- 1441–1450 : Jacques de Gaujac
- 1450–1453 : Guillaume d'Estouteville
- 1462–1488 : Jean de Corguilleray
- 1489–1516 : Guillaume Briçonnet

=== 1500–suppression ===
- 1516–1520 : Denis Briçonnet
- 1520–1524 : René du Puy
- 1526–1528 : Jean Mattei Giberti
- 1528–1529 : Laurent Toscan
- 1537–1546 : Lélio des Ursins de Céri
- 1546–1547 : Guido Ascanio Sforza, Cardinal, Administrator
- 1547–1558 : Dominique du Gabre
- 1558–1560 : Bernard del Bene
- 1560–1561 : Michel Briçonnet
- 1561–1566 : Claude Briçonnet
- 1566–1569 : Pierre de Barrault
- 1570–1573 : Alphonse Vercelli
- 1573–1580 : René de Birague
- 1580–1602 : Christophe de Lestang
- 1606–1611 : Gérard de Robin
- [1612–1622] : François de Lévis Ventadour, bishop-elect

? Anne de Lévis-Ventadour (Administrator ?)

- 1625–1651 : Jean Plantavit de la Pause
- 1648–1655 : François de Bosquet
- 1657–1669 : Roger de Harlay de Cési
- 1669–1671 : Jean-Armand de Rotundis de Biscarras
- 1671–1690 : Jean-Antoine de La Garde de Chambonas
- 1690–1732 : Jacques-Antoine de Phelypeaux
- 1732–1750 : Jean-Georges de Souillac
- 1750–1790 : Jean-Félix-Henri de Fumel

1790 : [ Jean-Georges Gabriel de Levezou ]

== See also ==
- Roman Catholic Archdiocese of Montpellier
- Catholic Church in France
- List of Catholic dioceses in France

== Bibliography ==
=== Reference works ===
- Gams, Pius Bonifatius (1873). Series episcoporum Ecclesiae catholicae: quotquot innotuerunt a beato Petro apostolo. Ratisbon: Typis et Sumptibus Georgii Josephi Manz. (Use with caution; obsolete)
- Eubel, Conradus, ed. (1913). Hierarchia catholica (in Latin). Vol. 1 (second ed.). Münster: Libreria Regensbergiana.
- Eubel, Conradus, ed. (1914). Hierarchia catholica (in Latin). Vol. 2 (second ed.). Münster: Libreria Regensbergiana.
- Eubel, Conradus; Gulik, Guilelmus (1923). Hierarchia catholica (in Latin). Vol. 3 (second ed.). Münster: Libreria Regensbergiana.
- Gauchat, Patritius (Patrice) (1935). Hierarchia catholica (in Latin). Vol. IV (1592–1667). Münster: Libraria Regensbergiana.
- Ritzler, Remigius; Sefrin, Pirminus (1952). Hierarchia catholica medii et recentis aevi (in Latin). Vol. V (1667–1730). Patavii: Messagero di S. Antonio.
- Ritzler, Remigius; Sefrin, Pirminus (1958). Hierarchia catholica medii et recentis aevi (in Latin). Vol. VI (1730–1799). Patavii: Messagero di S. Antonio.

=== Studies ===
- Alzieu, Gérard (1998). Les églises de l'ancien diocèse de Lodève au Moyen-Age (in French). Montpellier: Editions P. Clerc. ISBN 9782904091063.
- Duchesne, Louis (1907). Fastes épiscopaux de l'ancienne Gaule: I. Provinces du Sud-Est (in French) (2nd ed.). Paris: Fontemoing. pp. 313–314.. Archived.
- Du Tems, Hugues (1774). Le clergé de France, ou tableau historique et chronologique des archevêques, évêques, abbés, abbesses et chefs des chapitres principaux du royaume, depuis la fondation des églises jusqu'à nos jours (in French). Vol. Tome premier. Paris: Delalain.
- Fisquet, Honoré (1864). La France pontificale (Gallia Christiana): Beziers, Lodève, Saint-Pons de Thomières (in French). Paris: Etienne Repos.
- Jean, Armand (1891). Les évêques et les archevêques de France depuis 1682 jusqu'à 1801 (in French). Paris: A. Picard. pp. 266–267.
- Martin, Ernest (1900). Histoire de la ville de Lodève depuis ses origines jusquà̕ la Révolution. (in French). Montpellier: Serre, 1900 Volume 1. Volume 2.
- Paris, H.-G. de Mazamet (1851). Histoire de la ville de Lodève, de son ancien diocèse et de son arrondissement actuel. (in French). Montpellier: Boehm 1851. Volume 1. Volume 2.
- Pisani, Paul (1907). Répertoire biographique de l'épiscopat constitutionnel (1791–1802) (in French). Paris: A. Picard et fils.
- Plantavit de La Pause, Jean (1634). Chronologia praesulum Lodouensium. Authore Ioanne Plantauitio de La Pause episcopo et domino Lodouensi Montis-bruni comite (in Latin). sumptibus authoris, in vsum Cleri Lodouensis. [tendentious, inventive]
- Sainte-Marthe, Denis de; Hauréau, Barthélemy (1739). Gallia Christiana: In Provincias Ecclesiasticas Distributa, De provincia Narbonensi (in Latin). Vol. Tomus sextus (VI). Paris: Typographia Regia. pp. 525–609, Instrumenta, 263–294.

== Sources ==
- Gallia Christiana ;
- Histoire de Lodève, by Ernest Martin
