= Loches-sur-Ource =

Commune in Grand Est, France

- Commune
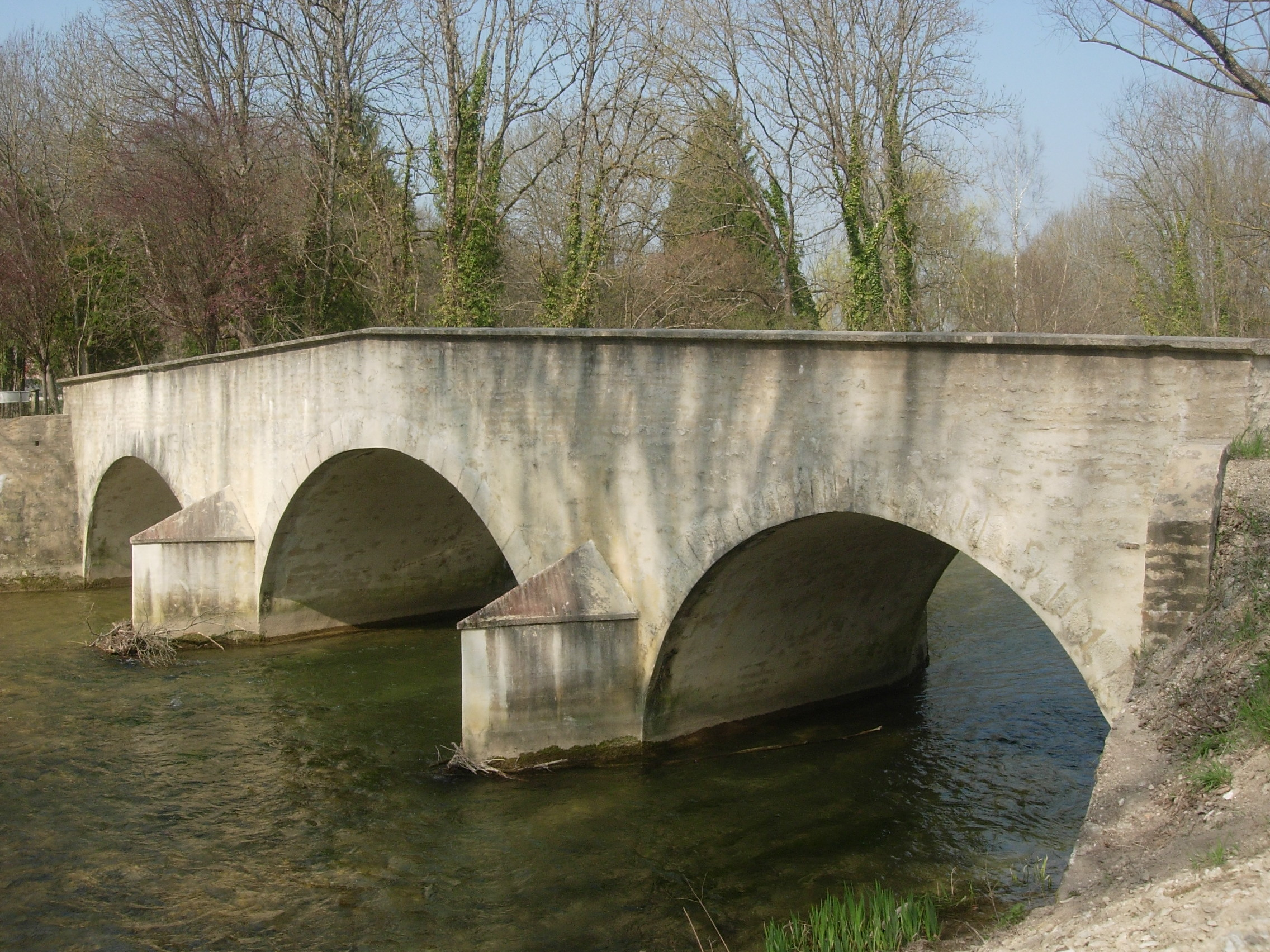
- Roman bridge over the Ource
- Location of Loches-sur-Ource
- Location within France Location within Grand Est
- Coordinates: 48°03′51″N 4°30′19″E
- Country: France
- Region: Grand Est
- Department: Aube
- Arrondissement: Troyes
- Canton: Bar-sur-Seine
- Intercommunality: Barséquanais en Champagne

Government
  - Mayor (2025–2026): Martine Kucharski
- Area^{1}: 13.71 km^{2} (5.29 sq mi)
- Elevation: 182 m (597 ft)
- Population (2023): 350
  - Density: 26/km^{2} (66/sq mi)
- Time zone: UTC+01:00 (CET)
  - Summer (DST): UTC+02:00 (CEST)
- INSEE/Postal code: 10199 /10110
- ^{1} French Land Register data, which excludes lakes, ponds, glaciers > 1 km^{2} (0.386 sq mi or 247 acres) and river estuaries.

Loches-sur-Ource (French pronunciation: [lɔʃ syʁ uʁs], literally Loches on Ource) is a commune in the Aube department in north-central France.

== Population ==
Historical population
Year	Pop.	±% p.a.
1968	397	—
1975	468	+2.38%
1982	431	−1.17%
1990	389	−1.27%
1999	397	+0.23%
2007	358	−1.28%
2012	370	+0.66%
2017	353	−0.94%
2023	350	−0.14%
Source: INSEE

== See also ==
- Communes of the Aube department
