= Lucien Corpechot =

French journalist and author (1871–1946)

Lucien Corpechot (French pronunciation: [lysjɛ̃ kɔʁp(ə)ʃo]; 27 March 1871 – 30 January 1946) was a French journalist and author. He was the editor-in-chief of Le Gaulois, L'Écho de Paris and Le Figaro. Six of his works were awarded prizes by the Académie Française.

== Biography ==
Lucien Corpechot served as editor-in-chief of Le Figaro, Le Gaulois, and L'Écho de Paris.

Associated with Maurice Barrès,Paul Bourget, and Charles Maurras, and a friend of Gyp—whose salon he frequented—he contributed to numerous newspapers under his own name or under the pseudonym “Curtius.”

Beginning in 1936, he published his Memoirs of a Journalist in three volumes. In the first volume, he sketches portraits of the Duke of Aumale, General Marchand, Paul de Kermaingant (editor of Le Soleil), Arthur Meyer (editor of Le Gaulois), his friend René Quinton, and Remy de Gourmont.

His works have earned him six awards from the Académie Française.
