= Le Bousquet-d'Orb =

- Commune
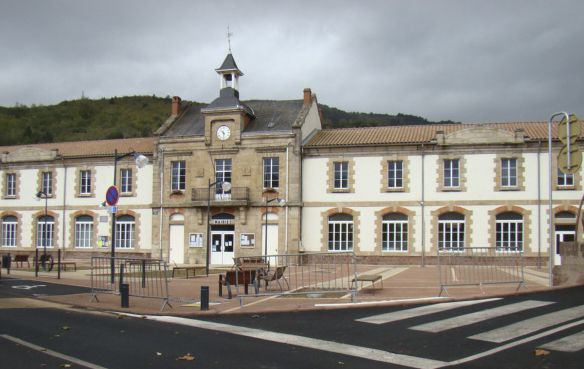
- Town hall

- Coat of arms
- Location of Le Bousquet-d'Orb
- Location within France Location within Occitanie
- Coordinates: 43°41′37″N 3°10′02″E
- Country: France
- Region: Occitania
- Department: Hérault
- Arrondissement: Béziers
- Canton: Clermont-l'Hérault

Government
  - Mayor (2025–2026): Jean-Luc Lanneau
- Area^{1}: 11.83 km^{2} (4.57 sq mi)
- Elevation: 257 m (843 ft)
- Highest elevation: 787 m (2,582 ft)
- Lowest elevation: 236 m (774 ft)
- Population (2023): 1,599
  - Density: 135.2/km^{2} (350.1/sq mi)
- Time zone: UTC+01:00 (CET)
  - Summer (DST): UTC+02:00 (CEST)
- INSEE/Postal code: 34038 /34260
- ^{1} French Land Register data, which excludes lakes, ponds, glaciers > 1 km^{2} (0.386 sq mi or 247 acres) and river estuaries.

Le Bousquet-d'Orb (French pronunciation: [lə buskɛ dɔʁb]; Languedocien: Lo Bosquet d’Òrb) is a commune in the Hérault department in southern France.

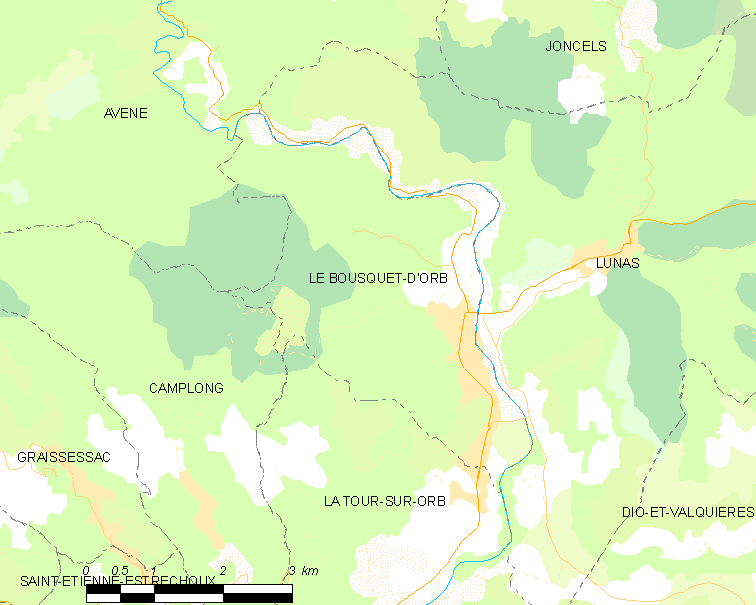
Map

== Population ==
Historical population
| Year | Pop. | ±% p.a. |
|---|---|---|
| 1968 | 2,270 | — |
| 1975 | 1,944 | −2.19% |
| 1982 | 1,816 | −0.97% |
| 1990 | 1,702 | −0.81% |
| 1999 | 1,483 | −1.52% |
| 2007 | 1,584 | +0.83% |
| 2012 | 1,583 | −0.01% |
| 2017 | 1,580 | −0.04% |
| 2023 | 1,599 | +0.20% |
Source: INSEE

== See also ==
- Communes of the Hérault department
