= Salamon =

Salamon is a name. Notable people with the name include:

== Given name ==
- Salamon Berger (1858–1934), Croatian industrialist
- Salamon Mørkved (1891–1978), Norwegian politician

== Surname ==
- Salamon family, Venetian noble family
- Andrzej Salamon (1936–2000), Polish swimmer
- Bartosz Salamon (born 1991), Polish professional footballer
- Bradford J. Salamon (born 1963), American academic
- Dietmar Salamon (born 1953), German mathematician
- Ed Salamon, American entertainment industry executive
- Ferenc Salamon (1825–1892), Hungarian historian
- Ferenc Salamon, Hungarian former water polo player
- Julian Salamon (born 1991), Austrian footballer
- Julie Salamon (born 1953), American author
- László Salamon (born 1947), Hungarian jurist, academic and politician
- Lester Salamon (born 1943), American academic
- Louis-Siffren-Joseph de Salamon (1750–1829), French diplomat and bishop
- Marina Salamon (born 1958), Italian entrepreneur
- Ödön Salamon (1864–1903), Hungarian journalist
- Peter Salamon, American mathematics professor
- Samantha Salamon, American politician
- Sergej Šalamon (born 1975), Slovenian sprinter
- Thomas Salamon (born 1989), Austrian footballer

== Fictional characters ==
- Salamon, a character in Digimon Adventure

== See also ==
- Suleiman, a name, including a list of variants
