= Ferenc Salamon =

Ferenc Salamon may refer to:

- Ferenc Salamon (historian) (1825–1892), historian, translator, and literary critic known for his writings on Ottoman Hungary
- Ferenc Salamon (water polo) (?1930–), Hungarian former water polo player, Olympian, and physician
