= Jules-Géraud Saliège =

French Cardinal of the Roman Catholic Church

His Eminence Jules-Géraud Saliège
- Cardinal, Archbishop of Toulouse
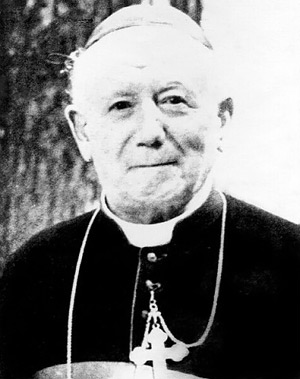
- Church: Catholic Church
- Archdiocese: Toulouse
- Appointed: 6 December 1928
- Installed: 14 February 1929
- Term ended: 5 November 1956
- Predecessor: Jean-Augustin Germain
- Successor: Gabriel-Marie Garrone
- Other post: Cardinal-Priest of Santa Pudenziana (1946-56)
- Previous post: Bishop of Gap (1925-28)

Orders
- Ordination: 21 September 1895 by Jean-Marie-François Lamouroux
- Consecration: 6 January 1926 by Paul-Augustin Le Coeur
- Created cardinal: 18 February 1946 by Pius XII
- Rank: Cardinal-Priest

Personal details
- Born: Jules-Géraud Saliège; 24 February 1870 Mauriac, Cantal, France
- Died: 5 November 1956 (aged 86) Toulouse, France
- Motto: Sub umbra illius
- Coat of arms

Styles of Jules-Géraud Saliège
- Reference style: His Eminence
- Spoken style: Your Eminence
- Informal style: Cardinal
- See: Toulouse

Jules-Géraud Saliège (24 February 1870 – 5 November 1956) was a French Cardinal of the Roman Catholic Church. He served as Archbishop of Toulouse from 1928 until his death, and was a significant figure in Catholic resistance to Nazism in France. He was elevated to the cardinalate in 1946 by Pope Pius XII. For his efforts to protect Jews during the Nazi Holocaust he was recognised as Righteous among the Nations by Yad Vashem.

== Biography ==
Born in Mauriac, Cantal, in the Diocese of Saint-Flour, Jules-Géraud Saliège studied at the Seminary of Saint-Sulpice in Paris before being ordained to the priesthood on 21 September 1895. He then taught at the minor seminary in Pleaux until 1903, and at the seminary in Saint-Flour from 1903 to 1907, when he was named its rector. He was made an honorary canon of the cathedral chapter of Saint-Flour on 14 September 1905, before becoming an honorary vicar general on 31 March 1918. During World War I, he served as a military chaplain.

On 29 October 1925, Saliège was appointed Bishop of Gap by Pope Pius XI. He received his episcopal consecration on 26 January 1926, from Bishop Paul-Augustine Lecoeur, with Bishops Benjamin Roland-Gosselin and Hippolyte de La Celle serving as co-consecrators, in Saint-Flour Cathedral. Saliège was later named Archbishop of Toulouse on 17 December 1928.

=== Nazi period ===
During the Nazi occupation of France, he was outspoken in attacking the German treatment of Jews and conscription of Frenchmen. For his criticism of the Nazis' and Vichy's anti-Jewish policies, he was praised by the Vatican newspaper.

With the free press silenced in Vichy France, Charles Lederman, a Jewish Communist, approached Saliège to alert public opinion to what was being done to the Jews. He told Saliège of the arrests, kidnappings and deportations. Saliège read his famous Pastoral letter the following Sunday. Other bishops - Monseigneur Théas, Bishop of Montauban, Monseigneur Delay, Bishop of Marseilles, Cardinal Gerlier, Archbishop of Lyon, Monseigneur Vansteenberghe of Bayonne and Monseigneur Moussaron, Archbishop of Albi - also denounced the roundups from the pulpit and through parish distributions, in defiance of the Vichy regime. The protest of the bishops is seen by various historians as a turning point in the formerly passive response of the Catholic Church in France.

Saliège wrote to his parishioners: "The Jews are real men and women. Not everything is permitted against these men and women, against these fathers and mothers. They are part of the human species. They are our brothers like so many others. A Christian should not forget this". The words encouraged other clerics like the Capuchin priest Père Marie-Benoît.

=== Post-war ===
Pope Pius XII created him Cardinal Priest of S. Pudenziana in the consistory of 18 February 1946. In 1950, the Cardinal excommunicated a priest within his archdiocese for rejecting the dogma of the Assumption of Mary. He also encouraged the Christianization of society.

Saliège died in Toulouse, at age 86. He is buried in Saint-Étienne Cathedral, Toulouse.

He was posthumously awarded the title Righteous among the Nations by Yad Vashem.

Preceded by Gabriel-Roch de Llobet	Bishop of Gap; 1925–1928	Succeeded by Camille Pic
Preceded by Jean-Augustin Germain	Archbishop of Toulouse; 1928–1956	Succeeded by Gabriel-Marie Garrone
