= Florus (disambiguation) =

Florus is a Roman cognomen.

Florus may also refer to:

- Gessius Florus, Roman governor of Judaea from 64 to 66
- Lucius Annaeus Florus, Roman historian
- Publius Annius Florus, Roman poet and rhetorician
- Florus of Lodève, legendary first bishop of Lodève
- Florus of Lyon, ecclesiastical writer
- Florus and Laurus, Christian martyrs
