= René Séjourné =

French Roman Catholic bishop (1930–2018)

- Bishop of Saint-Flour
- Church: Catholic Church
- Diocese: Diocese of Saint-Flour
- In office: 13 September 1990 – 16 January 2006
- Predecessor: Jean Cuminal
- Successor: Bruno Grua
- Previous post: Titular Bishop of Labicum (1987-1990)

Orders
- Ordination: 7 October 1955 by Henri Alexandre Chappoulie
- Consecration: 5 September 1987 by Pope John Paul II

Personal details
- Born: René Pierre Louis Joseph Séjourné; 20 May 1930 Aviré, Maine-et-Loire, France
- Died: 1 June 2018 (aged 88) Angers, Pays de la Loire, France

René Séjourné (20 May 1930 – 1 June 2018) was a French Roman Catholic bishop.

Séjourné was born in France and was ordained to the priesthood in 1995. He served as titular bishop of Labico from 1987 to 1990. Séjourné then served as the bishop of the Roman Catholic Diocese of Saint-Flour, France, from 1990 to 2006.
