= Louis-Siffren-Joseph de Salamon =

French bishop and papal diplomat

His Excellency, The Most Reverend Louis-Siffrein-Joseph de Salamon
- Bishop of Saint-Flour
- Church: Roman Catholic Church
- In office: 1820-1829
- Other post: Titular Bishop of Orthosia of Caria (1807-1820)

Orders
- Consecration: 1807 by Cardinal Giuseppe Maria Doria Pamphilj

Personal details
- Born: Louis-Siffrein-Joseph de Salamon; 1750 Carpentras
- Died: 1829 (aged 78–79) Saint-Flour

Styles of Louis-Siffrein-Joseph de Salamon
- Reference style: His Excellency; The Most Reverend
- Spoken style: Your Excellency
- Religious style: Bishop

Louis-Siffren-Joseph de Salamon (b. at Carpentras, 22 October 1750; d. at Saint-Flour, 11 June 1829) was a French Bishop of Saint-Flour, and papal diplomat of the period of the French Revolution.

== Life ==
After studying law and theology at Avignon, at that time belonging to the Papal States, he was made auditor of the Roman Rota by the favour of Pope Pius VI. This office he resigned for a post in the Parlement of Paris, where he took part in the famous case of the Diamond Necklace (1784), which Cardinal de Rohan had supposedly purchased for Marie Antoinette, but which was later revealed to have been purchased for Jeanne de la Motte. He continued to be a member until the Parliament was abolished (1790).

Meanwhile he had kept up a correspondence with the cardinal Secretary of State, informing him of all that passed in Paris and could be of interest to Pius VI. When the nuncio, Antonio Dugnani, left Paris towards the end of 1790, the Pope appointed Salamon to be his internuncio at the Court of Louis XVI. His Catholicism marked him out for persecution, and accordingly he was thrown into prison at the time of the September massacres, 1792. Twice he narrowly escaped death.

On his release he wandered about in disguise, acting as vicar Apostolic. In 1801 Giovanni Battista Caprara arrived in France as papal legate and appointed him administrator general of the dioceses of Normandy. The new pontiff, Pope Pius VII, did not select him for one of the sees under the Concordat, but made him titular bishop of Orthosia of Caria. It was not until after the Restoration that he received a French see at the suggestion of Louis XVIII (1820).

== Works ==
His "Memoires" were discovered at Rome and published by Abbé Bridier (Mémoires inédits de l'internonce à Paris pendant la Révolution, Paris, 1890). They have been translated by Frances Jackson (A Papal Envoy during the Reign of Terror, London, 1911).
