= Ethnographic Museum, Zagreb =

Croatian museum

Coordinates: 45°48′30″N 15°58′01″E

Etnographic Museum Zagreb
- Etnografski muzej Zagreb

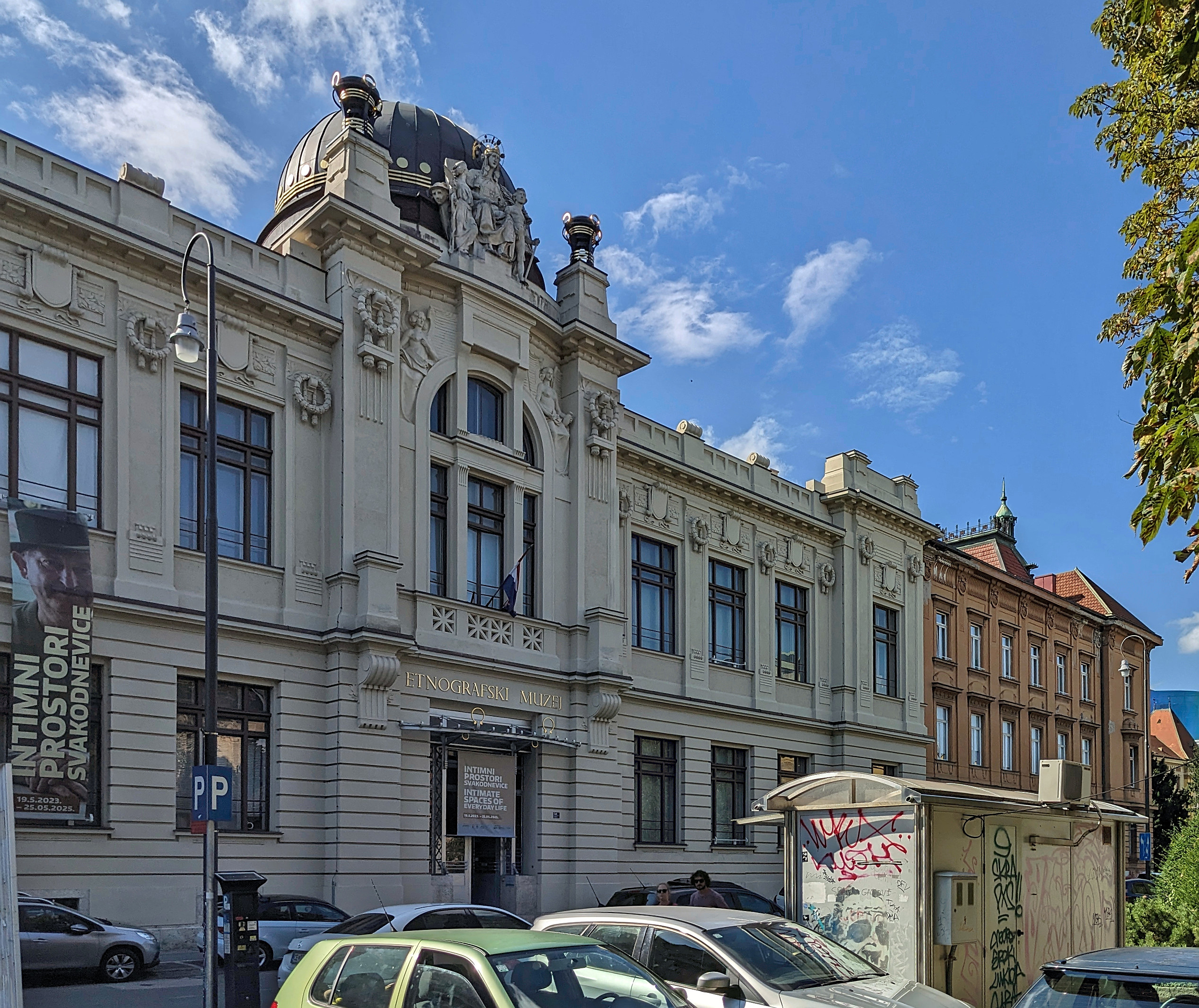
- Ethnography museum entrance
- Former name: Ethnography Museum in Zagreb
- Established: 22 October 1919; 106 years ago
- Location: Ivan Mažuranić Square 14, Zagreb, Croatia
- Type: Ethnography museum
- Collection size: 85.000
- Director: dr. sc. Zvjezdana Antoš
- Curator: Tea Rittig
- Public transit access: Bus line 118, Tram lines: 1, 11, 12, 13, 14, 17, 32, 34
- Website: emz.hr

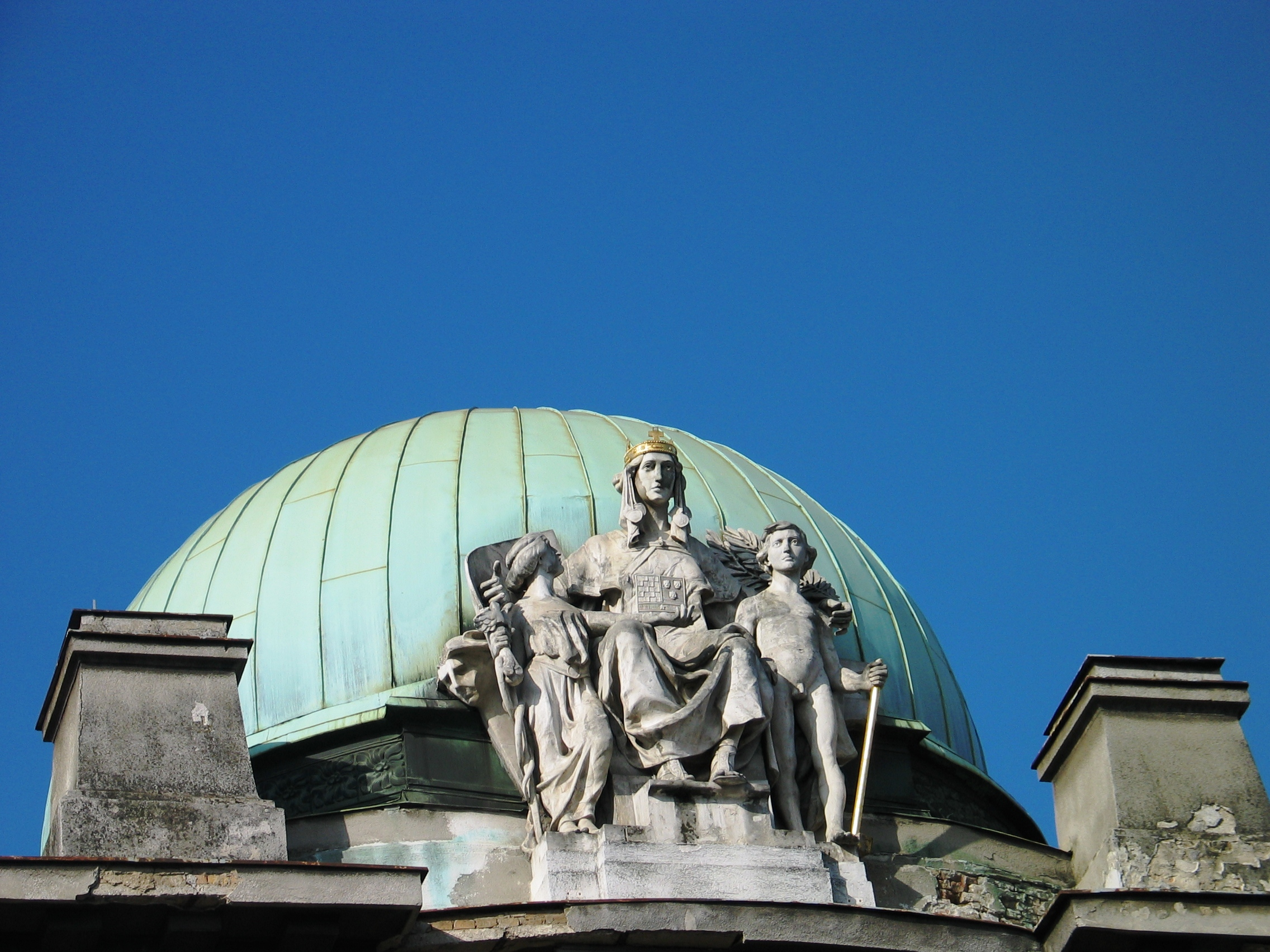
Dome and statues on the facade of museum

The Ethnographic Museum Zagreb is ethnography museum which is located at 14 Ivan Mažuranić Square in Zagreb, Croatia. It was founded in 1919 by Salamon Berger. It lies in the Secession building of the one-time Trades Hall of 1903, designed by the architect Vjekoslav Bastl. The statues in the central part of the façade are the work of Rudolf Valdec. The frescoes on the interior part of the cupola were painted by Oton Iveković.

== Overview ==
The holdings of about 80,000 items cover the ethnographic heritage of Croatia, classified in three cultural zones: the Pannonian, Dinaric and Adriatic. Only about 2,800 items are on display. The exhibits richly illustrate the traditional way of life in Croatia, with a display of gold embroidered costumes and ceremonial dresses, music instruments, furniture, cooking utensils and tools. The reconstruction of farms and rooms gives an insight in the traditional life of farmers and fishermen. The Ljeposav Perinić collection consists of a number of dolls, dressed in traditional costumes. The museum features permanent exhibitions relating to life in Kosovo during the Ottoman era and focuses on a circle of life theme, with displays focusing on birth, life, death and heritage. Divided among two buildings, visitors will see rooms furnished just as they would have been during Ottoman times, as well as a traditional "room of birth" and "room of death." Other rooms display traditional jewelry, costumes, pottery, weapons and other tools. Enthusiastic and knowledgeably English-speaking guides are available to walk you through the museum and share even more of the area's history and culture.

The museum also houses a large collection based on non-European cultures from Latin America, Central Africa, India, Melanesia, Polynesia and Australia.

== Gallery ==
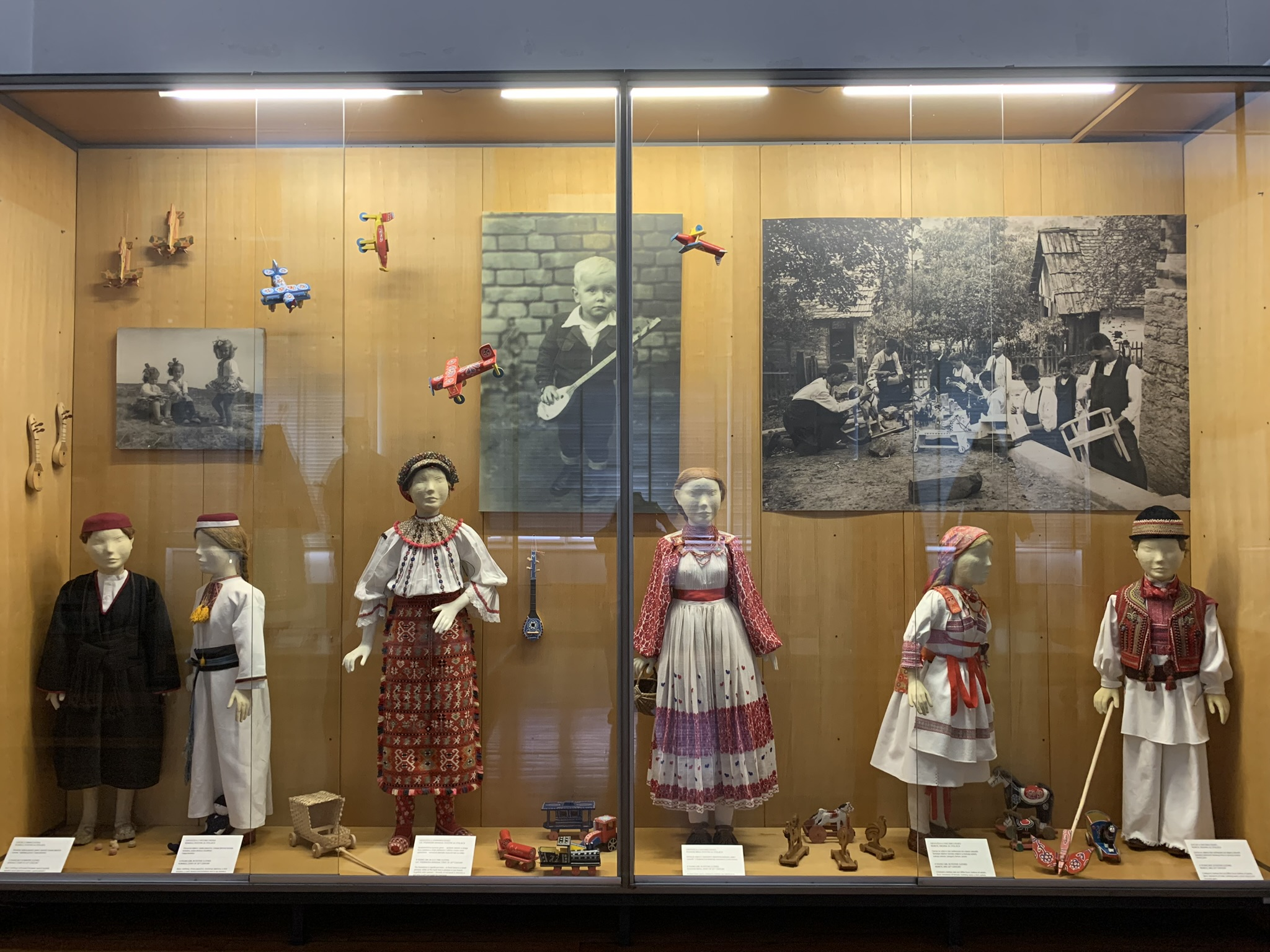
Traditional Croatian kids clothing

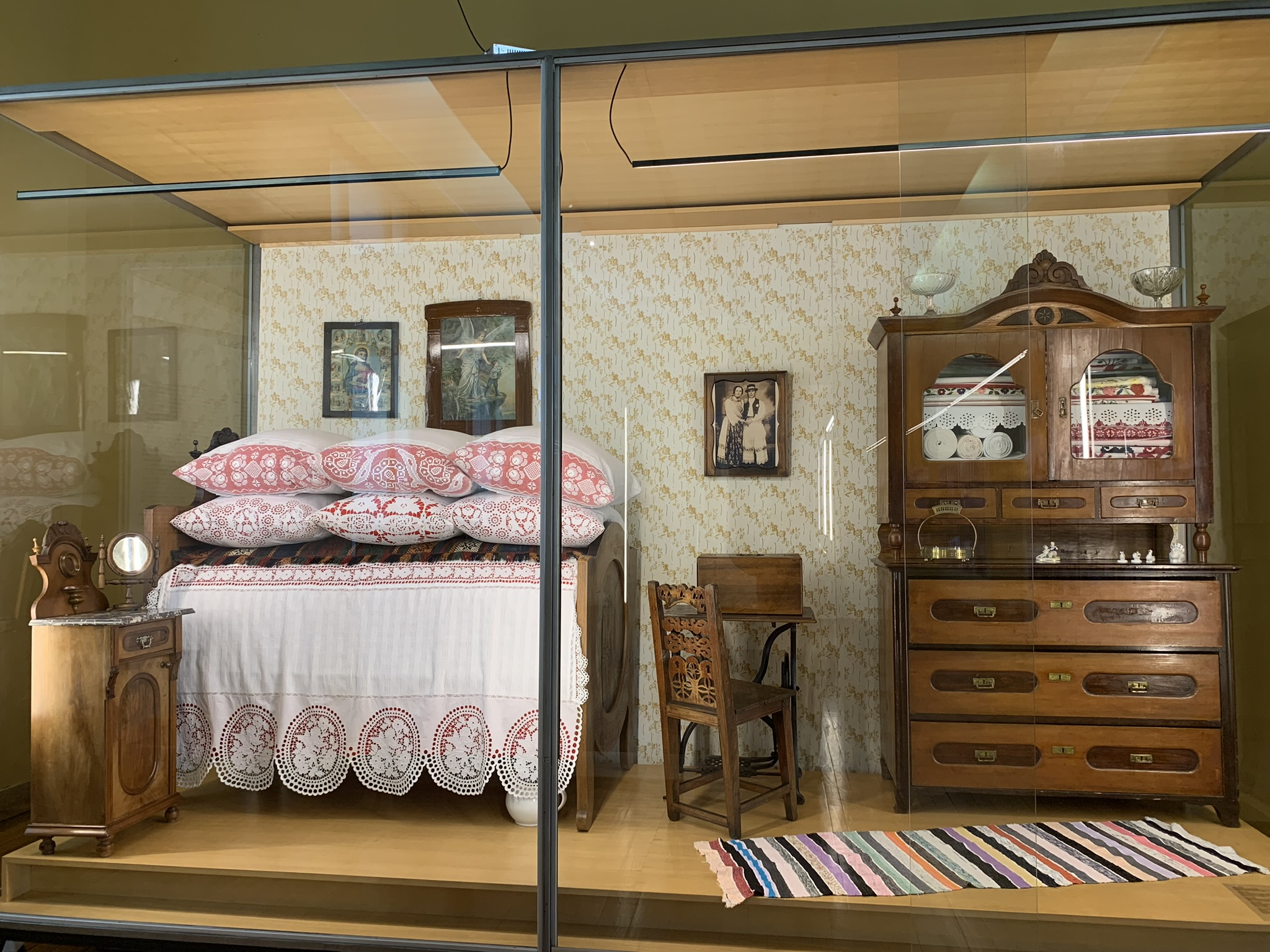
Traditional Croatian room

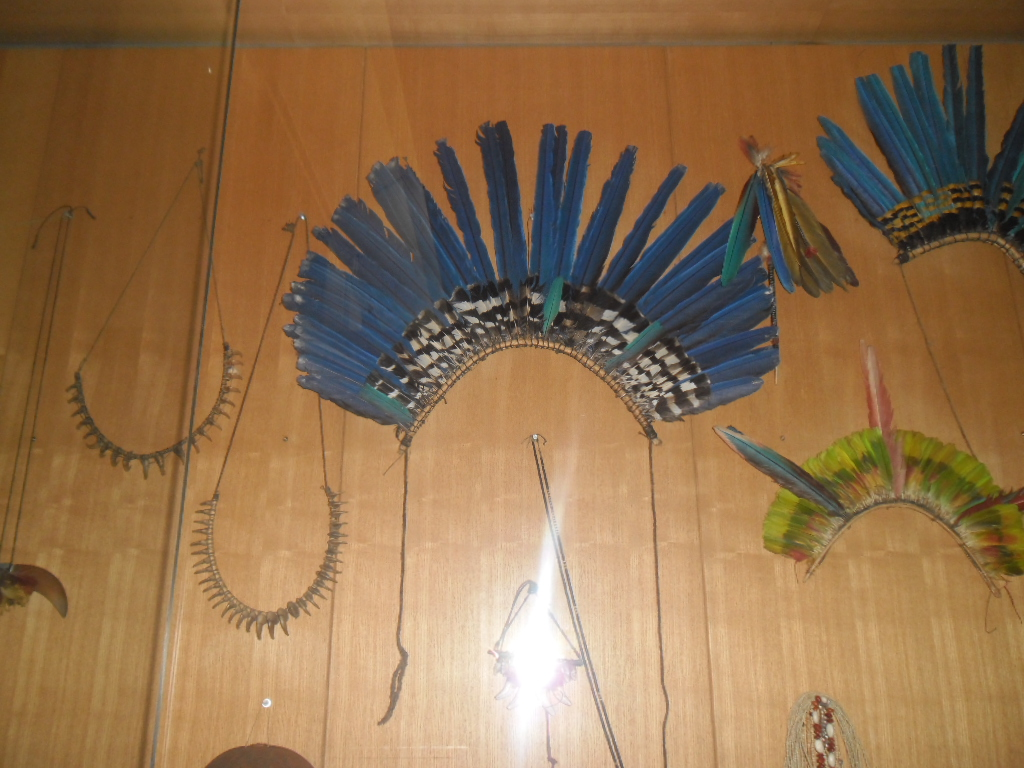
Collection from Latin America

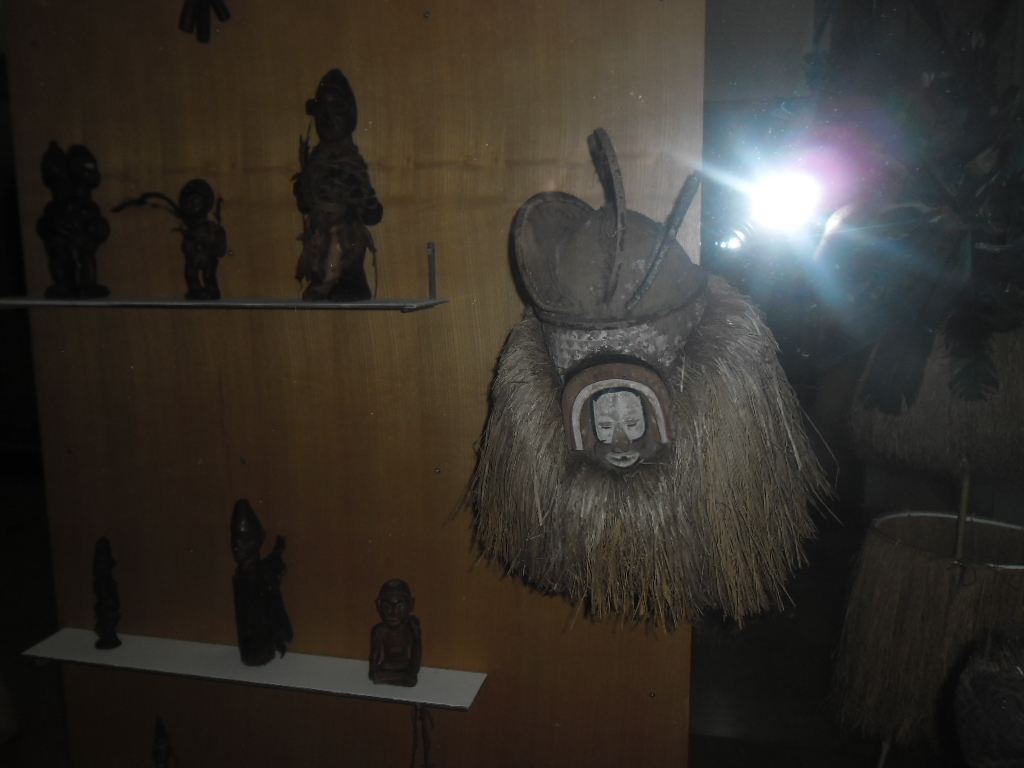
Mask

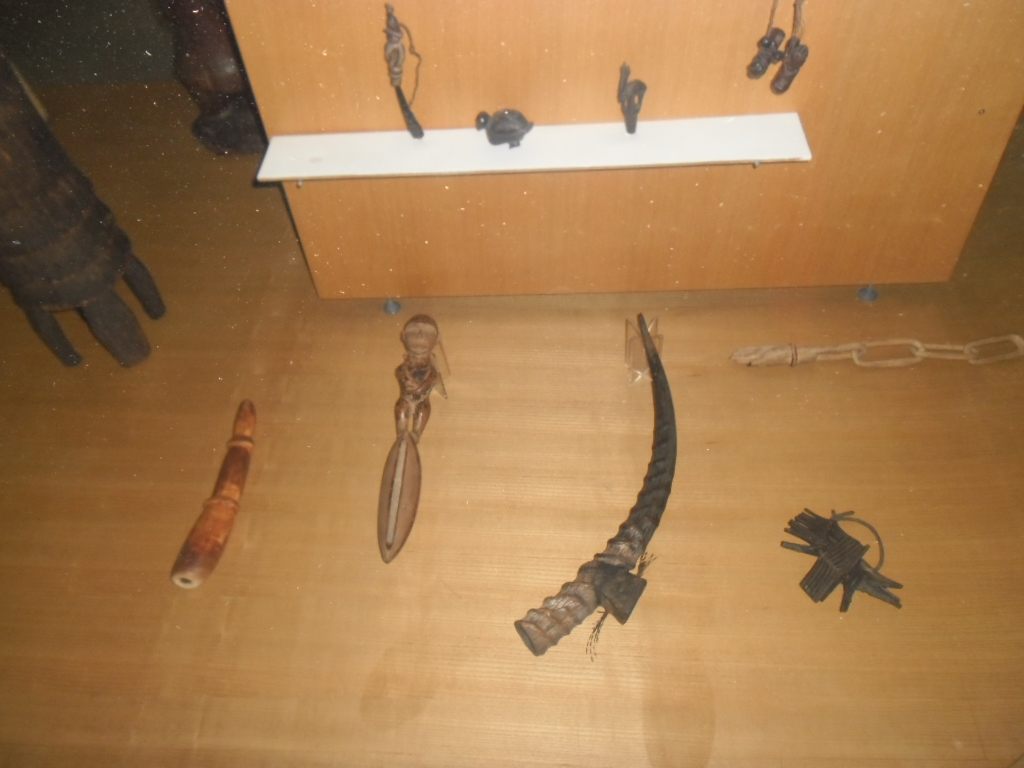
African weapon collection

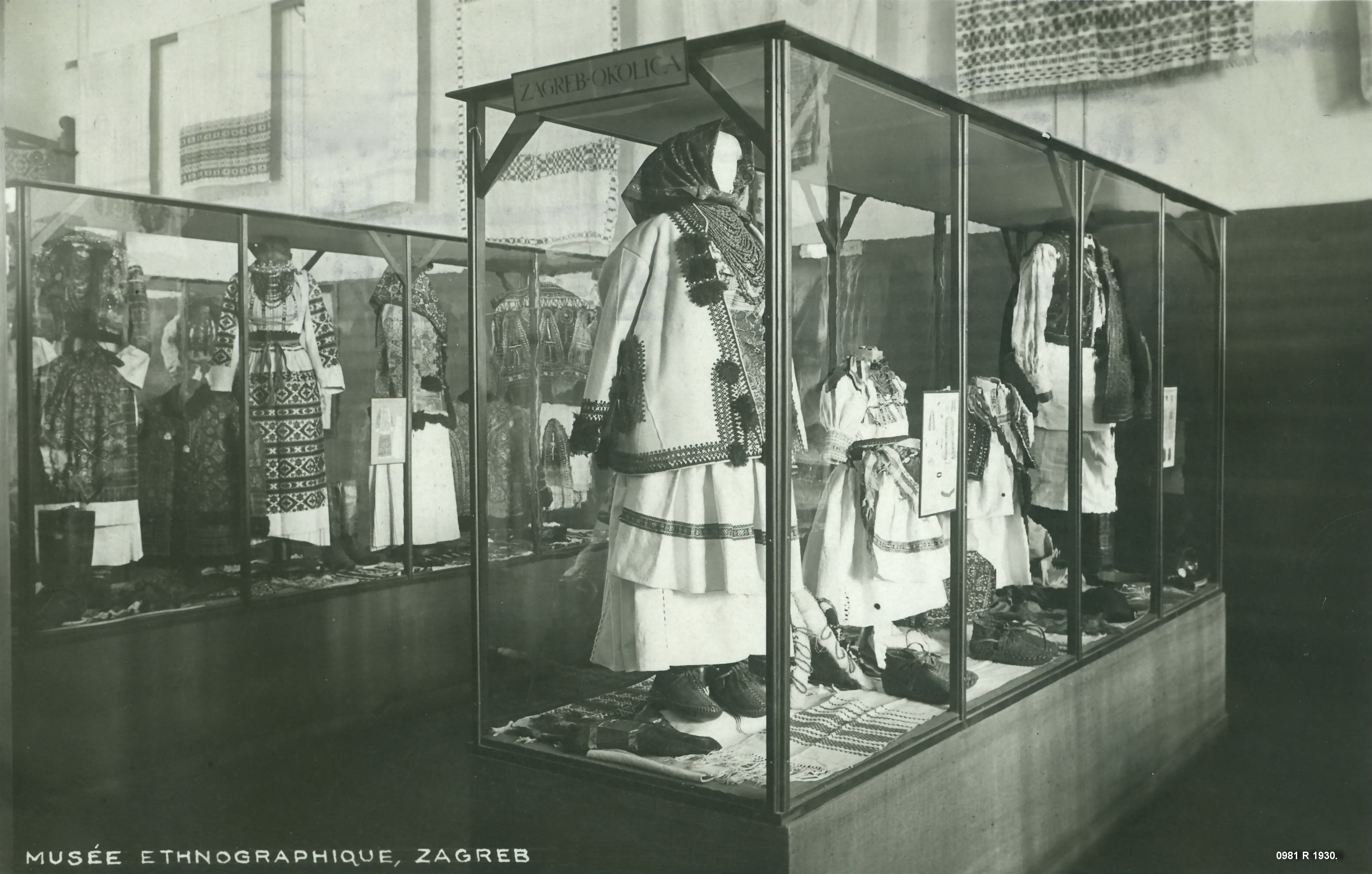
Traditional Croatian dress

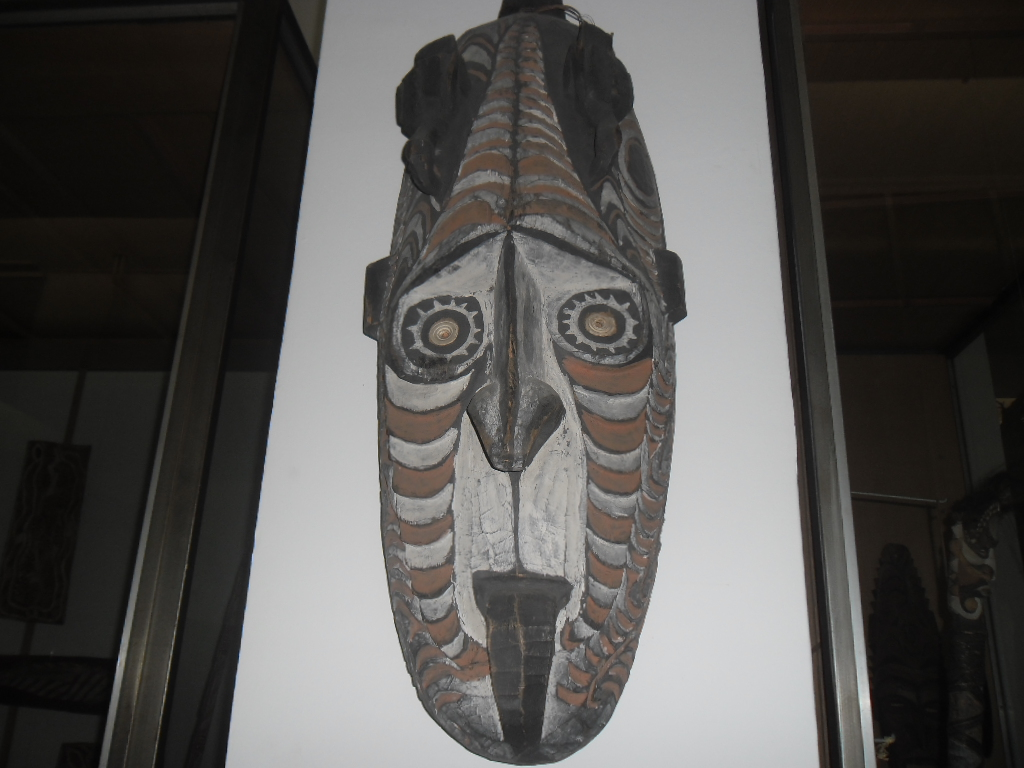
African collection

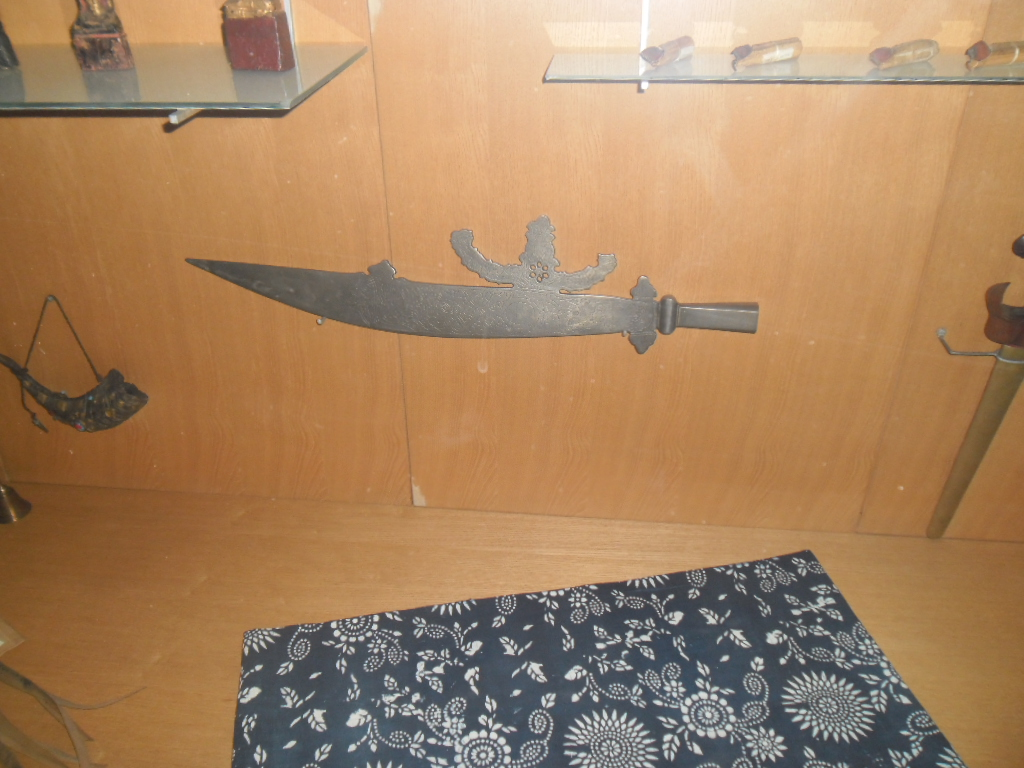
weapon collection

== See also ==
- List of museums in Croatia
