= Saint-Flour Cathedral =

Cathedral in Saint-Flour, France

Coordinates: 45°02′00″N 3°05′42″E

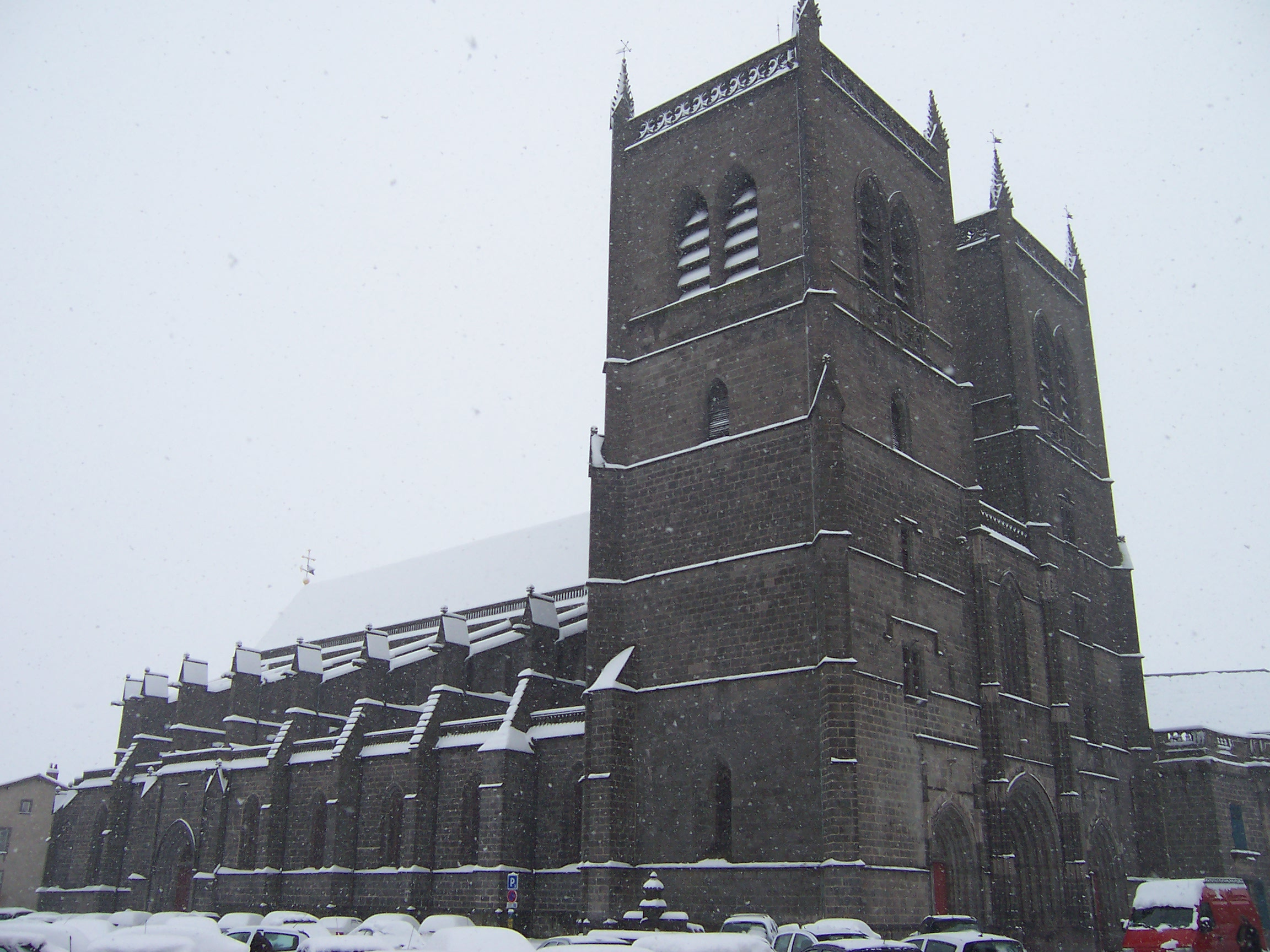
Saint-Flour Cathedral.

Saint-Flour Cathedral (French: Cathédrale Saint-Pierre-et-Saint-Flour de Saint-Flour) is a Roman Catholic church located in the town of Saint-Flour in the Auvergne, France. The dedication is to Saint Peter and Saint Florus, the first bishop of Lodève, who is also the eponym of the town. It has been a monument historique since 30 October 1906.

The cathedral is the seat of the Bishops of Saint-Flour.

It is a Gothic structure, built between 1398 and 1466.

== History ==
A first church was built to house the remains of Florus, a bishop of dubious historicity and first legendary apostle of Upper Auvergne. This building is attested by a papal bull of Pope Gregory V at the end of the 10th century.

In the 11th century, Odilon de Mercœur, Abbot of Cluny built a Romanesque basilica that Pope Urban II consecrated in 1095 under the triple name of Saint-Sauveur, Saint-Pierre and Saint-Flour.

In the 14th century, Pope John XXII created the dioceses of Saint Flour.

In 1396 there was a partial collapse of the north side of the building. Bishop Hugues de Manhac oversaw the reconstruction in spite of a difficult situation (Hundred Years' War, plague). A new, Gothic cathedral with three naves and four towers (two on the west and one on each side) was consecrated by Bishop Antoine de Montgon in 1466.

During the French Revolution in 1793, the building was ransacked and transformed into a temple of the Supreme Being. The cathedral was restored to a church in 1802.

Between 1846 and 1856, important restoration work was undertaken under the leadership of Monseigneur de Marguerye, bishop of Saint-Flour. The two lateral towers are demolished between 1862 and 1866.

The cathedral is classified as a historical monument on October 30, 1906. In 2010, Bruno Grua, bishop of Saint-Flour commissioned new works on the building.

== Gallery ==
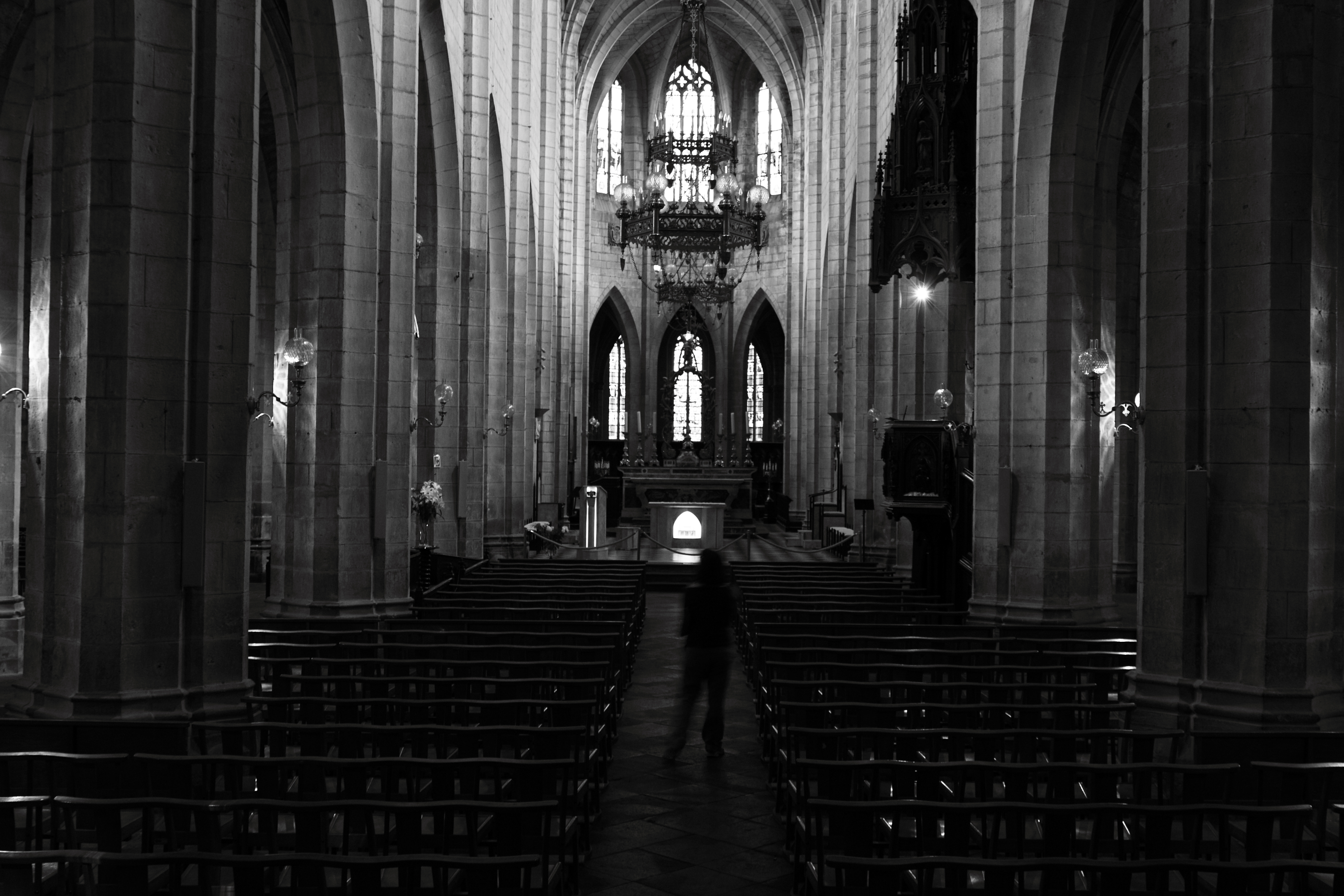
Saint-Flour Cathedral interior

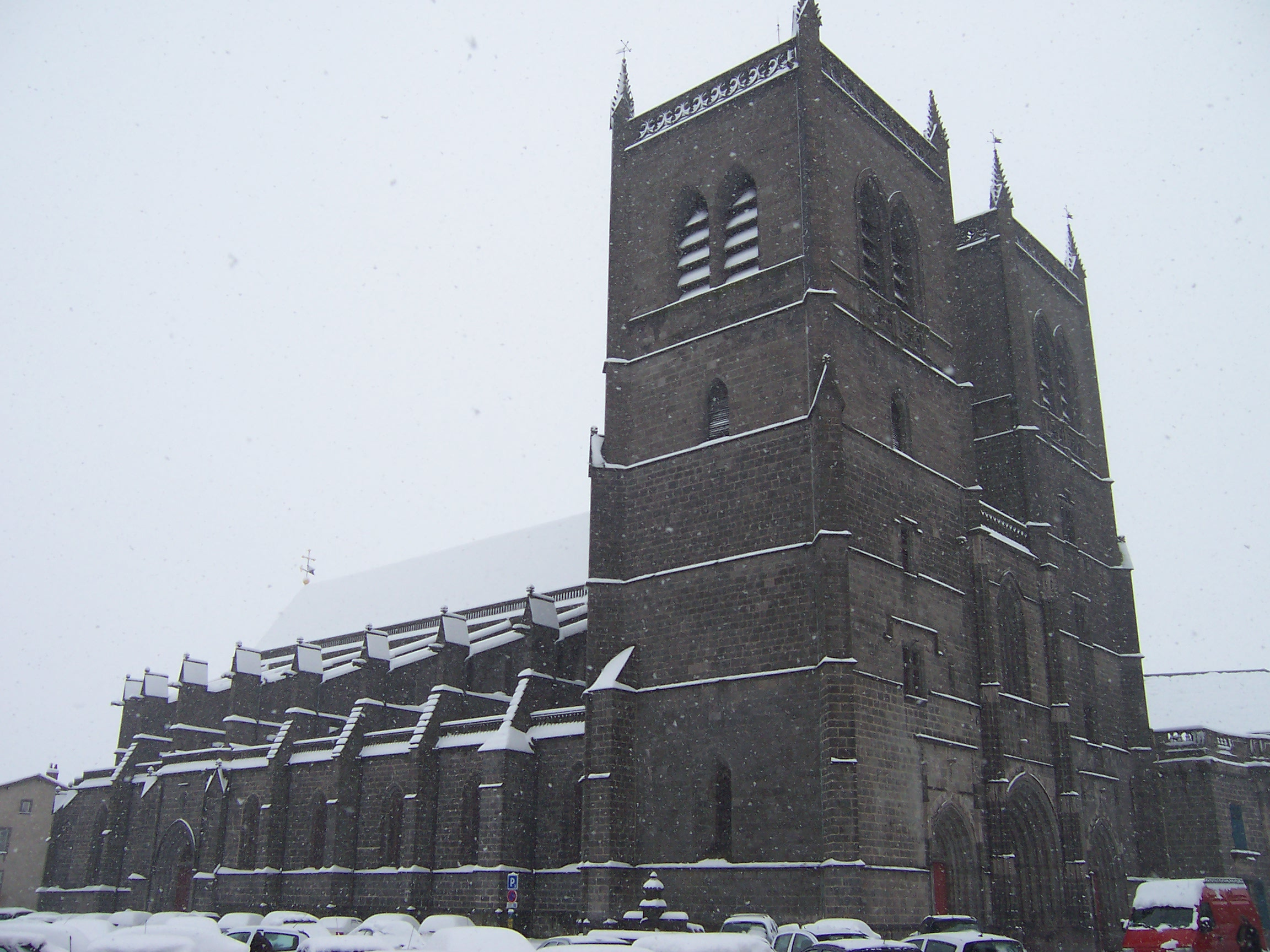
Saint-Flour Cathedral in winter

== Sources and external links ==
- Saint-Pierre-et-Saint-Flour Cathedral at Structurae
- Catholic Hierarchy: Diocese of Saint-Flour
- Location of cathedral
