= Aurillac Abbey =

Abbey in Aurillac, France

- Abbey of Saint Gerald, Aurillac
- Abbaye Saint-Géraud d'Aurillac
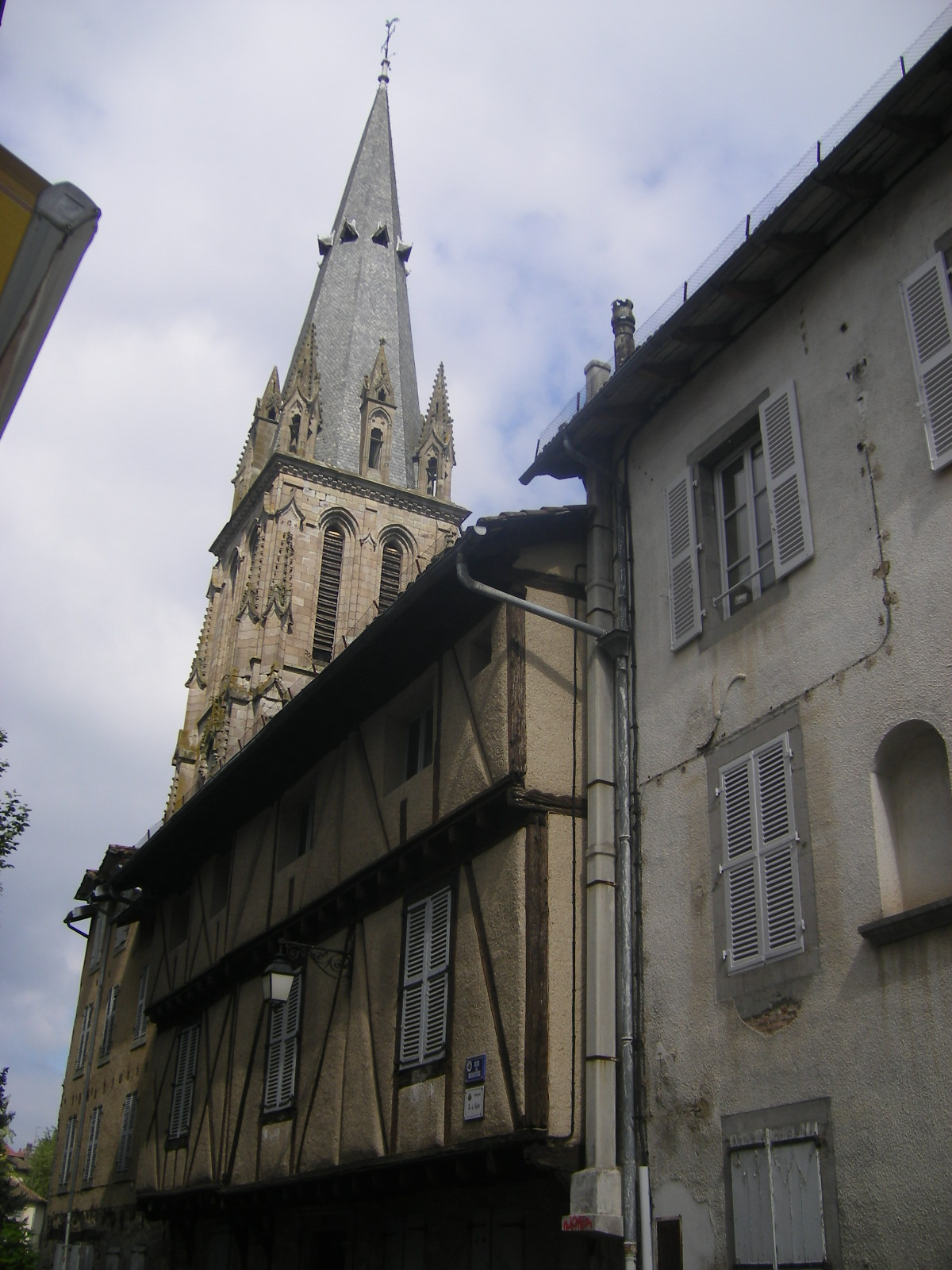
- Aurillac Abbey
- 44°55′53″N 2°26′54″E
- Location: Aurillac, Auvergne, France
- Address: Place Saint-Géraud
- Denomination: Catholic
- Religious institute: Order of Saint Benedict

History
- Founder: Gerald of Aurillac

Architecture
- Style: Romanesque
- Groundbreaking: 885
- Completed: 916

Administration
- Diocese: Roman Catholic Diocese of Saint-Flour

Aurillac Abbey, otherwise the Abbey of Saint Gerald, Aurillac (French: Abbaye Saint-Géraud d'Aurillac), founded around 895 in Auvergne (in the present department of Cantal) by Count Gerald of Aurillac, destroyed during the French Wars of Religion and suppressed with the Revolution, was one of the oldest Benedictine abbeys, and probably influenced, in its arrangements and organization, the foundation of Cluny itself.

The abbey was also a leading intellectual center in the Middle Ages, the cradle of the French cultural and literary renewal of the 10th century: it formed among others Gerbert, later Pope Sylvester II, who maintained strong ties with his monastery of origin until his death.

== History ==
=== Foundation ===
Count Gerald, considering that his vast domains, which stretched between the Monts of Auvergne, Rouergue, Périgueux and Tulle were allodial, never wanted to pay homage to any lord for his own lands, except for those of Talizat because, as explains Odo of Cluny in his biography of Gerald, his isolated position in the Planèze, outside the Monts of Auvergne, did not allow him to defend it. In vain his cousin William the Pious, Duke of Aquitaine and Count of Auvergne, proposed that he take the vassal oath: Gerald would answer only to the sovereign.

During one of his frequent pilgrimages to Rome (893-894), he formalized by public deed his willingness to donate his seigniorial estates and benefices of Aurillac to St. Peter the Apostle, for the purpose of building an abbey dedicated to him and maintaining “an abbot, 39 monks and some persons, lay or regular, in the service of the house,” and to pay an obolus of five solidi to St. Peter each year; the abbey, according to Gerald's intentions, was placed by Pope Formosus directly under the dependencies of the Holy See.

In the following years Gerald began the construction of the abbey church, initially ex novo on the plain below the castle of Aurillac, then, abandoning this first project following a collapse, renovating and enlarging the pre-existing church of St. Clement, built by his father and in which his parents rested.

To populate the abbey Gerald turned to the Benedictine abbey of Vabres, where he sent a group of his young followers, eager to take up the monastic life, to be formed. The first abbot was Adalgarius (or Adelgarius), chosen by Gerald himself by virtue of papal privilege.

Gerald, wishing to take the abbey away from local powers (whether secular or religious), placed Aurillac under the direct protection of the sovereign, obtaining to this end a letter of exemption from Charles the Simple, which was issued in Bourges on June 2, 899, and sanctioned for the abbey to be free and exempt from all civil and episcopal jurisdictions; the abbot of Aurillac could therefore wear - like a bishop - the symbols of the miter and crosier.

The consecration of the first abbey church took place in 907, in honor of St. Peter and St. Clement; in 909 Gerald of Aurillac wished to dispose of his remaining property and possessions, which were nonetheless substantial, and with a clause to his deed of gift from twenty years before, he gave possession to the abbey, dividing its usufruct rights in part among some of his servants and his nephew (who simultaneously inherited the rights of justice and protection over the monastery); it was for Aurillac the beginning of an economic rise that reached its peak in the 16th century.

=== Rise ===
After the founder's death, except for the biography of him compiled by Odo of Cluny, very little is known about the abbey until the 12th century: it is through an anonymous chronicle written around 1137 by a monk from Aurillac that the succession of the first abbots is known. Gerald died in the odor of sanctity on October 13, 909; only a few days before him in the tomb was the first abbot, Adelgarius: he was succeeded by Jean, a relative of the count, on good terms with Pope John X, who confirmed the relationship of dependence with Aurillac in exchange for an annual obolus of 12 solidi.

Odo of Cluny was abbot of Aurillac around 924, for a short time (in 926 he was called to Cluny upon the death of Berno). It was during that time that the cult of Gerald probably began, to which an impetus certainly came from Odo himself, who later wrote his biography.

Odo, after taking over the leadership of Cluny, did not abandon Aurillac altogether, leaving Arnulf as his own coadjutor and co-abbot; in the following years the two of them made a decisive impact on the destiny of the abbey: by introducing to Aurillac the customs of Cluny they elevated its prestige, then founded a school of theology, grammar and music later renowned for centuries. Pilgrimages began, and the abbey's enclosure soon proved too cramped.

In 936 Count Raymond Pons I of Toulouse founded the abbey of Saint-Pons-de-Thomières, and asked Aurillac for some monks to populate it. In the same year, with the involvement of the count himself, the monastery of Saint-Sauveur was founded, still as an emanation of Aurillac, on the lands of the lord of Chanteuge. The following year it was the bishop of Puy, Godescalc, who submitted the monastery of Saint Théofrède at Le Monastier-sur-Gazeille to Arnulf for reform. From then on, foundations and dependencies multiplied.

The fifth abbot of Aurillac, Adralde, initiated the construction of a new church, which was brought to completion by his successor Géraud de Saint-Céré, and dedicated in 962.

=== Apogee ===
At the turn of the 10th and 11th centuries, the cult of St. Gerald spread rapidly, partly due to the intervention of the various pontiffs, from Nicholas II onward, who in the course of time took charge of the abbey, gratifying its founder with the titles of blessed and saint.

Aurillac grew rapidly through the support of notable patrons such as the Counts of Toulouse, the Counts of Poitiers, and the Viscounts of Narbonne, but also through the offerings of simple believers and pilgrims, which were numerous given its strategic location along the pilgrimage route to Rome, Catalonia, and Santiago de Compostela. These routes also had a network of priories serving travelers, such as the hospice of Sainte-Marie-du-Mont, at the hill of Mont-Cébro in Cerdanya.

In 1061, by Pope Nicholas II, and then again in 1068 by Pope Alexander II, Aurillac saw its privileges confirmed before the sovereign, bishops and local lords: right of justice, free election of the abbot, direct dependence on the Holy See, etc. At that time at least five priories depended on Aurillac.

Pope Urban II, after the Council of Clermont in which Abbot Pierre II de Cisières had also taken part, visited Aurillac in December 1095 and consecrated the renovated abbey church; in the following March he confirmed Aurillac's status with a bull.

According to a bull of Pope Nicholas IV issued around 1290, the abbey of Aurillac owned more than a hundred priories, which later became as many parishes, then communes, located in 17 different dioceses. Their estates produced more than 80,000 livres of income at that date.

The abbey, which possessed a library and scriptorium, was a very important intellectual and cultural center for the 10th century: it is known from Gerbert's correspondence with his old master that he procured ancient manuscripts for his old abbey; there is also John of Salisbury's testimony about the monks of Luxeuil: “They are masters, not only of eloquent men, but of eloquence itself, for [they are] equal in many respects to the monks of Aurillac, who have acquired great skill and long practice in a great number of sciences.”

=== Distinguished guests ===
The following people have stayed or lived in Aurillac:

- Borrell II, count of Barcelona
- Gerbert of Aurillac
- Robert the Pious, king of France
- Pope Urban II
- William of Auvergne, minister and adviser to Louis IX of France

=== Secularization ===
The abbey retained a very important patrimony in which income in kind gradually declined, with most priories being secularized to become parishes.

The strict application of the Benedictine Rule according to Cluniac observance gradually diminished during the last centuries of the Middle Ages, in Aurillac as in many other Benedictine foundations, partly because of the long crisis brought about by the Hundred Years' War; with the modern era a slow and imperceptible secularization took place with the abandonment of the cloister and the communal dormitory, and the allocation of prebends.

Beginning with a bull of Pope Pius IV dated May 13, 1561, under the abbey of Martin de Beaune, chancellor of Queen Catherine de' Medici, who had appointed him against the advice of the monks, the abbots became commendatories and ceased to be elected by the chapter and to reside in the abbey, while enjoying its prebends.

=== Destruction by the Calvinists ===
Shortly afterwards, under the abbey of Cardinal Luigi Pisani, a Venetian nobleman who stayed there only for investiture, the town of Aurillac was attacked, on September 6, 1569, by a band of Calvinists: church, convent, abbey palace, sculptures, tombs, everything was destroyed and set on fire. Precious metals were melted down and taken to Geneva, books, manuscripts, and archives were burned in the square. In the name of the princes of Navarre and Condé all the abbey's property was sold at auction. During 14 months the townspeople were cut up, tortured, sometimes murdered, to extort their money.

Today not much remains of the old monastery: the Romanesque facade of the old hospice, a few square towers that were part of the defensive system, a few walls of the church of Saint Peter incorporated into the church of Saint-Géraud, a new 17th-century reconstruction by Charles de Noailles, abbot of Aurillac in 1606, then bishop of Saint-Flour in 1610 (the work was finished in 1643).

The last reconstruction of the church was finished in the second half of the 19th century to the design of architect Jules Lisch, who also rebuilt the Château Saint-Étienne, or Jean-Baptiste-Antoine Lassus, according to sources, with the addition of two bays to the nave and a portico, as well as the complete reconstruction of the bell tower.

== Chronotaxis of abbots ==
=== Elected abbots ===
The abbey's coat of arms and its motto

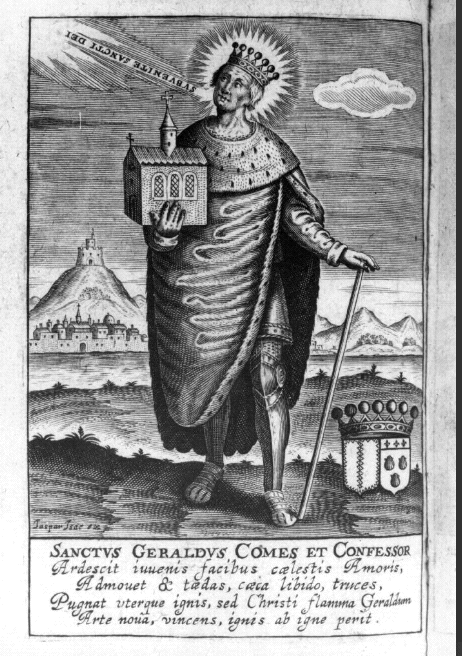
St. Gerald with the arms of the abbey and the city of Aurillac

Ancient blazon (in use until the 15th century)

1. 898 Adalgario (Adalgarius)
2. 907 Jean I
3. 920 Odo of Cluny
4. 926 Arnulf
5. Adralde I
6. Géraud I de Saint-Céré, he finished the construction of the second abbey church, dedicated in 962; he rebuilt the church founded by Gerald's father
7. 987 Raimond de La Vaur, teacher of Gerbert of Aurillac.
8. 1010 Adralde II de Saint-Christophe
9. 1039 Géraud II du Bex
10. Géraud III de Caussade
11. Géraud IV de Capdenac
12. Pierre I de Limagne
13. Émile
14. Pierre II de Cisières
15. Gosbert
16. Pierre III de La Roque d'Aton
17. Pierre IV d'Alzon
18. Gaucelin d'Alzon
19. 1141 Guillaume I
20. 1144 Ebles
21. 1167 Pierre V Brun
22. 1195 Guillaume II
23. 1203 Ramnulphe
24. 1204 Géraud V de Cardaillac
25. 1233 Bertrand I
26. 1252 Aymard de Valette; first cellarer of the abbey, was then appointed abbot of Figeac by the abbot of Cluny, and later elected abbot of Aurillac
27. 1262 Guillaume III Arnaud
28. 1291 Pierre VI de Malfayde
29. 1303 Draconnet de Montauban
30. 1311 Guillaume IV; under his abbacy, a bull by Pope Clement V authorized abbots to celebrate Mass in pontifical dress. He refused the elevation of Aurillac to a diocese; instead, the episcopal see was installed in Saint-Flour
31. 1320 Archambaud; already bishop of Auvergne at the time of his election, the consuls refused him entry into Aurillac in bishop's dress, claiming that the city of St. Gerald was directly dependent on the Holy See
32. 1335 Guillaume V d'Angles
33. 1340 Aymeric de Montal, son of Bertrand, lord of Laroquebrou, and Gaillarde de Sévérac
34. 1356 Pierre VII de Saint-Exupéry
35. 1424 Bertrand II de Saint-Beauzire
36. 1440 Hugues de Roche d'Agoux
37. 1464 Jean II d'Armagnac de Pardiac, bishop of Castres, son of Bernard VIII, count of Pardiac, and Éléonore de Bourbon, countess of La Marche. He was brother of Jacques d'Armagnac, duke of Nemours.
38. 1489 Pierre VIII de Balzac
39. 1490 Gratien de Villeneuve
40. 1499 Antoine II de Cardaillac
41. 1502 Charles I de Saint-Nectaire
42. 15?? Jean of Lorraine
43. 1550 Agostino Spinola
44. 1556 Charles II de Saint-Martin
45. 1558 Jean IV de Cardaillac
46. 1559 Charles III de Saint-Nectaire
47. 1560 Antoine III de Saint-Nectaire, son of Nectaire and Marguerite d'Estampes; elected bishop of Le Puy in 1561, he requested mass in commendam of the abbey.

=== Commendatory abbots ===
48. 1561 Martin Fournier de Beaune-Semblançay
49. 1565 Guillaume VI Viole, bishop of Paris
50. 1568 Cardinal Luigi Pisani
51. 1570 Paul de Foix
52. 1578 Cardinal Georges d'Armagnac
53. 1585 Philippe des Portes
54. 1603 Cardinal François de Joyeuse
55. 1615 Pierre IX de Réveilles
56. 1616 Cardinal Charles IV de Noailles, bishop of Saint-Flour, bishop of Rodez, deputy to the 1614 Estates General
57. 1648 Louis II Barbier de La Rivière
58. 1670 Hercule de Mauziéri
59. 1679 Cardinal Léon Potier de Gesvres
60. 1744 Jean V Sébastien François de Barral, bishop of Castres
61. 1752 Claude-Mathias de Barral, brother of the previous one, bishop of Troyes
62. 1787 Jacques de Cambefort de Serieys.

== See also ==
- Aurillac

== Bibliography ==
- Besse, Jean-Martial (1912). Abbayes et prieurés de l'ancienne France [Abbeys and priories of old France] (in French). Vol. 5. Parigi: Jouve et C.ie. pp. 266–269.
- Bouange, Guillaume-Marie-Frédéric (1899). Histoire de l'abbaye d'Aurillac, précédée de la vie de saint Géraud son fondateur (894-1789) [History of the abbey of Aurillac, preceded by the life of Saint Géraud, its founder (894-1789)] (in French). Vol. 1. A. Fontemoing. OCLC 27462755.
- Joubert, Edouard (1981). L'Abbaye bénédictine de Saint Géraud d'Aurillac (894-1561) [The Benedictine Abbey of Saint Géraud d'Aurillac (894-1561)] (in French). Aurillac: Imprimerie moderne.
- Olleris, Alexandre (1862). Gerbert. Aurillac et son monastère [Gerbert. Aurillac and its monastery] (in French). Clermont: F. Thibaud.
- de Sainte-Marthe, Denis (1720). Gallia christiana [Christian France] (in French). Vol. 2. Parigi. pp. 438 ff.
- Revue de La Haute-Auvergne : 972-1972 - Aurillac, n°1, Jul-Dec 1972
- Revue de La Haute-Auvergne : 972-1972 - Aurillac, n°2, Jan-Jun 1973
- Monboisse, René (1966). L'ordre féodal des Montagnes d'Auvergne du XIIe au XVe siècle [The feudal order of the Auvergne Mountains from the 12th to the 15th century] (in French). Aurillac: Imprimerie moderne. OCLC 490012314.
