= Salamon Berger =

Croatian Jewish industrialist (1858–1934)

Salamon Berger Ouz
- Born: 25 February 1858; Mnešice, Nové Mesto nad Váhom, Austrian Empire, (now Slovakia)
- Died: 11 January 1934 (aged 75); Zagreb, Kingdom of Yugoslavia, (now Croatia)

Salamon Berger Ouz (25 February 1858 – 11 January 1934) was a Croatian Jewish industrialist, textile trader, and founder and first director of the Ethnographic Museum in Zagreb.

Berger Ouz was born on 25 February 1858 in Mnešice, Nové Mesto nad Váhom, in present-day Slovakia. When he lost his parents at 16 years of age, Berger moved to Zagreb. As a textile merchant and manufacturer, Berger presented the products of Croatian industry on 96 exhibitions across the Europe, United States and Australia. Over the course of his business travels around Croatia and Kingdom of Yugoslavia, he amassed a collection of ethnographic artefacts. The biggest portion of textile artefacts in his collection – such as weavings and lace items – Berger had collected in the Posavina region. In 1919, Berger founded the Ethnographic Museum in Zagreb, featuring over 8,000 textile items from his collections, titled "The Land Collection of Salamon Berger". He also served as museum's first director until 1925, when he retired and was named honorary director. Berger died in Zagreb in 1934 and was buried at Mirogoj Cemetery.

== Bibliography ==
- Snješka Knežević, Aleksander Laslo (2011). Židovski Zagreb. Zagreb: AGM, Židovska općina Zagreb. ISBN 978-953-174-393-8.
