= Ödön Salamon =

Hungarian journalist

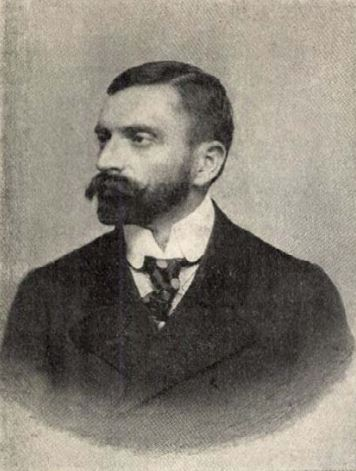
Salamon Ödön

Ödön Salamon (Érsekújvár Hungary (today Nové Zamsky in Slovakia) 17. February 1864 – Budapest Lands of the Crown of Saint Stephen, Austria-Hungary 6. November 1903) is a Hungarian journalist.

== His life ==
He finished secondary school in Budapest and started working as a journalist. He travelled to Paris in 1888, where he spent three years. He was the reporter of Vasárnapi Újság and Egyetértés. He wrote the history of the Hungarian Society of Paris. After going back to Budapest in 1891, he wrote pocket-books and interviews. These publications made him well known. He worked for the Hungarian State Opera House for two and a half years.

== His works ==
- Józan szerelmesek. Bpest, 1893. (Elbeszélések. Ism. Élet 111. l., Vasárnapi Ujság 2. sz.)
- A párbajhős. Bpest, 1897. (Monologok 65.)
- Kocsin és gyalog. Bpest, 1897. (Ism. M. Hirlap 343. sz., Hét 50., Vasárnapi Lapok 37., M. Kritika 1898. 8. sz.)
- Szervusz! Magánjelenet. Bpest, 1897. (Monologok 68.)
- A hosszú ruha. Bpest, 1898. és 1901. (Monologok gyűjteménye 5. és 96.)
- Vörös és fekete. (Monte-Carlo és a Riviera.) Bpest, 1900. (Az Uránia látványos darabja 2000 péld. nyom. Ism. Vasárnapi Ujság 44. sz.).
- Egyetlen szó miatt. Bpest, 1903. (Monologok 111.).
- Gondolatok és ötletek. Az előszót írta Bródy Sándor. Bpest, 1904.

== Sources ==
- Szinyei József: Magyar írók élete és munkái
