= Saint-Flour =

Subprefecture and commune in Auvergne-Rhône-Alpes, France

- Subprefecture and commune
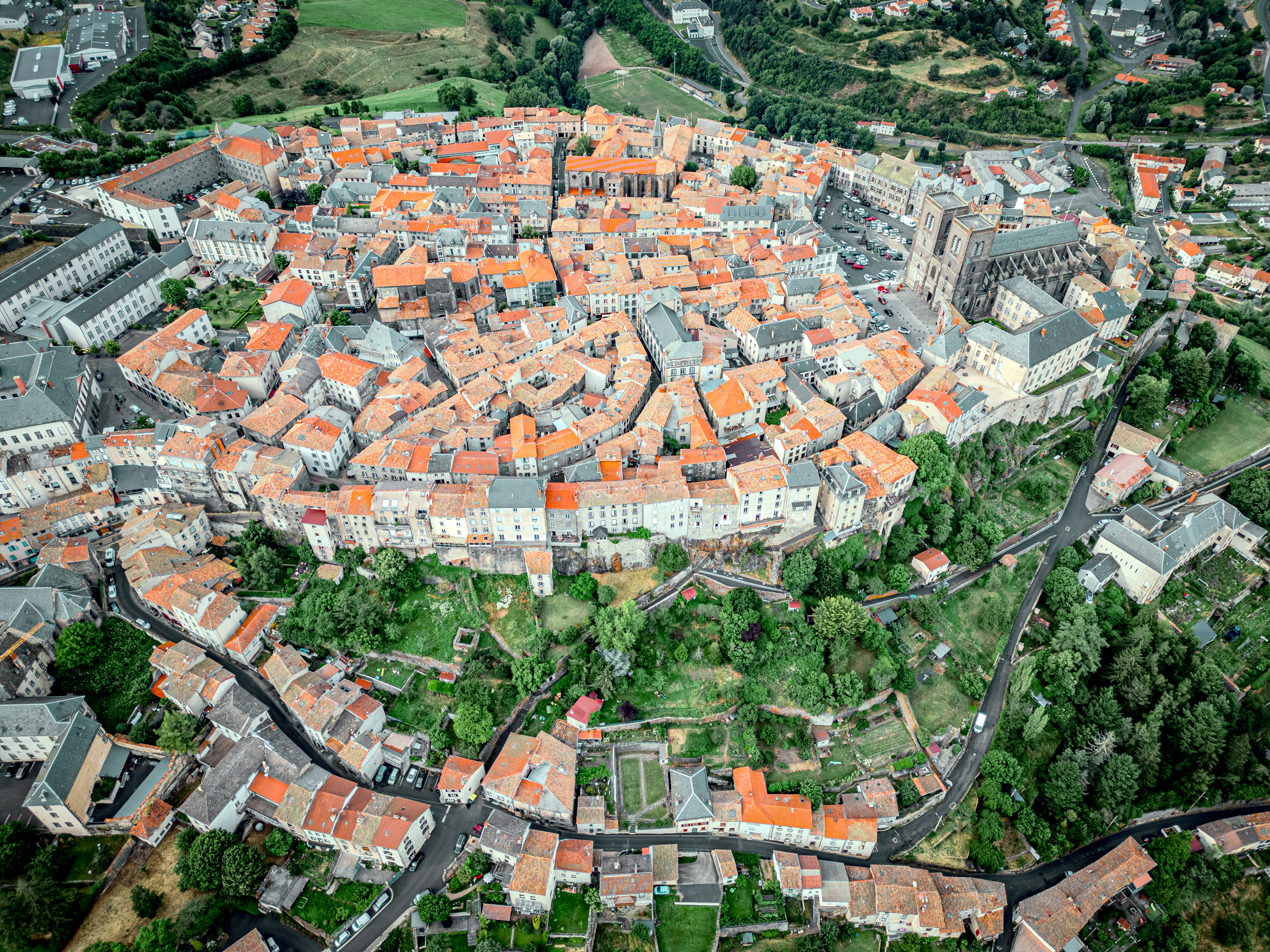
- Aerial view of Saint-Flour

- Flag Coat of arms
- Location of Saint-Flour
- Location within France Location within Auvergne-Rhône-Alpes
- Coordinates: 45°02′04″N 3°05′37″E
- Country: France
- Region: Auvergne-Rhône-Alpes
- Department: Cantal
- Arrondissement: Saint-Flour
- Canton: Saint-Flour-1 and 2
- Intercommunality: Saint-Flour Communauté

Government
  - Mayor (2020–2026): Philippe Delort
- Area^{1}: 27.14 km^{2} (10.48 sq mi)
- Elevation: 783 m (2,569 ft)
- Highest elevation: 1,040 m (3,410 ft)
- Lowest elevation: 757 m (2,484 ft)
- Population (2023): 6,391
  - Density: 235.5/km^{2} (609.9/sq mi)
- Time zone: UTC+01:00 (CET)
  - Summer (DST): UTC+02:00 (CEST)
- INSEE/Postal code: 15187 /15100
- ^{1} French Land Register data, which excludes lakes, ponds, glaciers > 1 km^{2} (0.386 sq mi or 247 acres) and river estuaries.

Saint-Flour (French: [sɛ̃fluʁ]; Auvergnat: Sant Flor) is a commune in the south-central French department of Cantal, approximately 100 km south of Clermont-Ferrand. Its inhabitants are called Sanflorains.

== Geography ==
The upper city (ville haute) of Saint-Flour is located on the abrupt volcanic dike Planèze, the lower city (ville basse or "Faubourg") extends on the banks of the Ander.

== History ==
=== Early history ===
There are numerous dolmens in the neighborhood and scattered traces of Bronze Age occupation. Roman occupation is signalled by two Roman villas of middling importance, one near the railroad station, the other a modest Augustan-age villa near the hamlet of Roueyre, part of Saint-Flour. The Roman name of this small vicus was Indiciacum or Indiciacus, which evolved into Indiciat in the sub-Roman period, a reference to the landmark of Planèze.

=== Middle Ages ===
Early, perhaps as early as the fifth century, Florus of Lodève, credited in medieval tradition with being the first bishop of Lodève and belonging to the apostolic era, arrived to Christianize the valley, and gave his name to the area, striking a rock with his staff, it was said, to create a holy spring that continued to be venerated under its Christianized guise, into the 20th century.

The present town called Indiciac took shape only around the millennium, clustered around the monastery founded on the high rock in 996, at first little more than an oratory. The site, already occupied by a small monastic community, was donated to Odilo of Cluny by the Auvergnat seigneur, Astorg de Brezons; the donation was confirmed by Pope Gregory V, i.e. in 996–99, but Astorg's nephew, Amblard "le mal Hiverné" ("the furious"), the comptour perhaps asserting residual family interests in the place, seized it and laid it waste, sparing the church. Astorg and Amblard together then donated it to St Peter's, but Amblard reconsidered and erected a fortress in the ruins of the monastery, but, seized with remorse, donated it once more to Odilo of Cluny. Urban II, following the Council of Clermont (1095) consecrated the new abbey church, which received a triple dedication reflecting local tradition and present affiliations: Saint-Sauveur, Saint Pierre and Saint Flour.

The diocese of Saint-Flour was established in August 1317 by the Avignon pope, John XXII.

=== French Revolution ===
During the French Revolution, the commune took several dechristianized successive names, Fort-Cantal'l, Fort-Libre and Mont-Flour. It returned to its ancient historic designation in the An II (1793). The territory of the commune was never changed. Briefly, between 1790 and 1795, it served as the préfecture, of the newly created département, before Aurillac had succeeded to that position.

== Population ==
Historical population

Year	Pop.	±% p.a.
1793	5,282	—
1800	5,312	+0.08%
1806	5,687	+1.14%
1821	6,372	+0.76%
1831	6,464	+0.14%
1836	5,640	−2.69%
1841	5,484	−0.56%
1846	5,473	−0.04%
1851	5,786	+1.12%
1856	5,661	−0.44%
1861	5,288	−1.35%
1866	5,218	−0.27%
1872	5,037	−0.59%
1876	5,381	+1.67%
1881	5,745	+1.32%
1886	5,477	−0.95%
1891	5,308	−0.62%
1896	5,605	+1.09%
1901	5,634	+0.10%

Year	Pop.	±% p.a.
1906	5,065	−2.11%
1911	5,777	+2.67%
1921	5,134	−1.17%
1926	5,201	+0.26%
1931	5,156	−0.17%
1936	5,384	+0.87%
1946	5,590	+0.38%
1954	5,763	+0.38%
1962	5,846	+0.18%
1968	5,997	+0.43%
1975	7,272	+2.79%
1982	7,950	+1.28%
1990	7,417	−0.86%
1999	6,625	−1.25%
2007	6,637	+0.02%
2012	6,645	+0.02%
2017	6,435	−0.64%
2023	6,391	−0.11%

Source: EHESS and INSEE (1968-2023)

== Notable natives ==
The troubadour Bernart Amoros recalled to his readers that he came from Saint-Flour:

Eu Bernartz Amoros clerges scriptors daquest libre si fui d'Alvergna don son estat maint bon trobador, e fui d'una villa que a nom Saint Flor de Planeza

Poet Pierre-Laurent Buirette de Belloy (1727–95), author of a once-celebrated tragedy on the Siege of Calais, was born at Saint-Flour.

== École d'Eté de Probabilités ==
The annual École d'Eté de Probabilités de Saint-Flour has resulted in a series of volumes concerning probability theory. Founded in 1971, the summer school is sponsored by Clermont Auvergne University, the European Mathematical Society, and CNRS.

== Monuments ==
- Saint-Flour Cathedral: a Gothic cathedral dating back to the 15th century. In the cathedral, there is a black Christ, stained-glass windows presenting the history of Florus, the Frescoes of Hell and Purgatory, and organs.
- Notre-Dame Collégiale: Gothic style, dating from the 14th century, served as a hall for the grain trade in the 19th century. It was rehabilitated between 2005 and 2008, and houses a rose window, designed by the sculptor Francesco Marino Di Teana, who also worked on the bronze door and stained glass.
- Saint Vincent Church: a Gothic style church which reflects the importance of religion in the Middle Ages in Saint-Flour and was a privileged place in the city, testified in its various uses: convent of the Jacobins, then court, Masonic temple and monastery of the Visitation. The Saint Vincent Church has been listed as a monument historique since 1960. Frescoes of great historical importance dating from the 15th century were discovered by Yves Morvan, a specialist in medieval wall paintings. These frescoes depicting Saint Anna are a tribute by the Dominicans to the mother of the Virgin Mary.

== Climate ==
Climate data for Saint-Flour, elevation 909 m (2,982 ft), (1991–2020 normals, extremes 1988–present)
Month	Jan	Feb	Mar	Apr	May	Jun	Jul	Aug	Sep	Oct	Nov	Dec	Year
Record high °C (°F)	17.0 (62.6)	23.0 (73.4)	22.6 (72.7)	28.0 (82.4)	31.6 (88.9)	37.0 (98.6)	36.8 (98.2)	36.6 (97.9)	31.9 (89.4)	29.5 (85.1)	20.9 (69.6)	15.9 (60.6)	37.0 (98.6)
Mean daily maximum °C (°F)	4.5 (40.1)	5.7 (42.3)	9.6 (49.3)	12.3 (54.1)	16.6 (61.9)	20.9 (69.6)	23.8 (74.8)	23.7 (74.7)	19.0 (66.2)	14.3 (57.7)	8.4 (47.1)	5.3 (41.5)	13.7 (56.7)
Daily mean °C (°F)	1.2 (34.2)	1.7 (35.1)	4.8 (40.6)	7.3 (45.1)	11.2 (52.2)	15.1 (59.2)	17.4 (63.3)	17.2 (63.0)	13.3 (55.9)	9.8 (49.6)	4.9 (40.8)	1.9 (35.4)	8.8 (47.8)
Mean daily minimum °C (°F)	−2.2 (28.0)	−2.3 (27.9)	0.1 (32.2)	2.3 (36.1)	5.9 (42.6)	9.3 (48.7)	11.0 (51.8)	10.7 (51.3)	7.6 (45.7)	5.3 (41.5)	1.3 (34.3)	−1.4 (29.5)	4.0 (39.2)
Record low °C (°F)	−15.3 (4.5)	−17.3 (0.9)	−20.5 (−4.9)	−8.0 (17.6)	−2.5 (27.5)	−0.4 (31.3)	3.0 (37.4)	1.3 (34.3)	−1.9 (28.6)	−8.4 (16.9)	−13.1 (8.4)	−18.4 (−1.1)	−20.5 (−4.9)
Average precipitation mm (inches)	51.6 (2.03)	42.5 (1.67)	43.4 (1.71)	72.3 (2.85)	83.1 (3.27)	73.2 (2.88)	60.2 (2.37)	75.0 (2.95)	83.0 (3.27)	80.8 (3.18)	72.7 (2.86)	62.5 (2.46)	800.3 (31.51)
Average precipitation days (≥ 1.0 mm)	8.6	7.3	7.8	10.3	10.6	8.1	7.1	8.2	8.2	9.2	9.6	8.9	104.0
Source: Meteociel

== Gallery ==
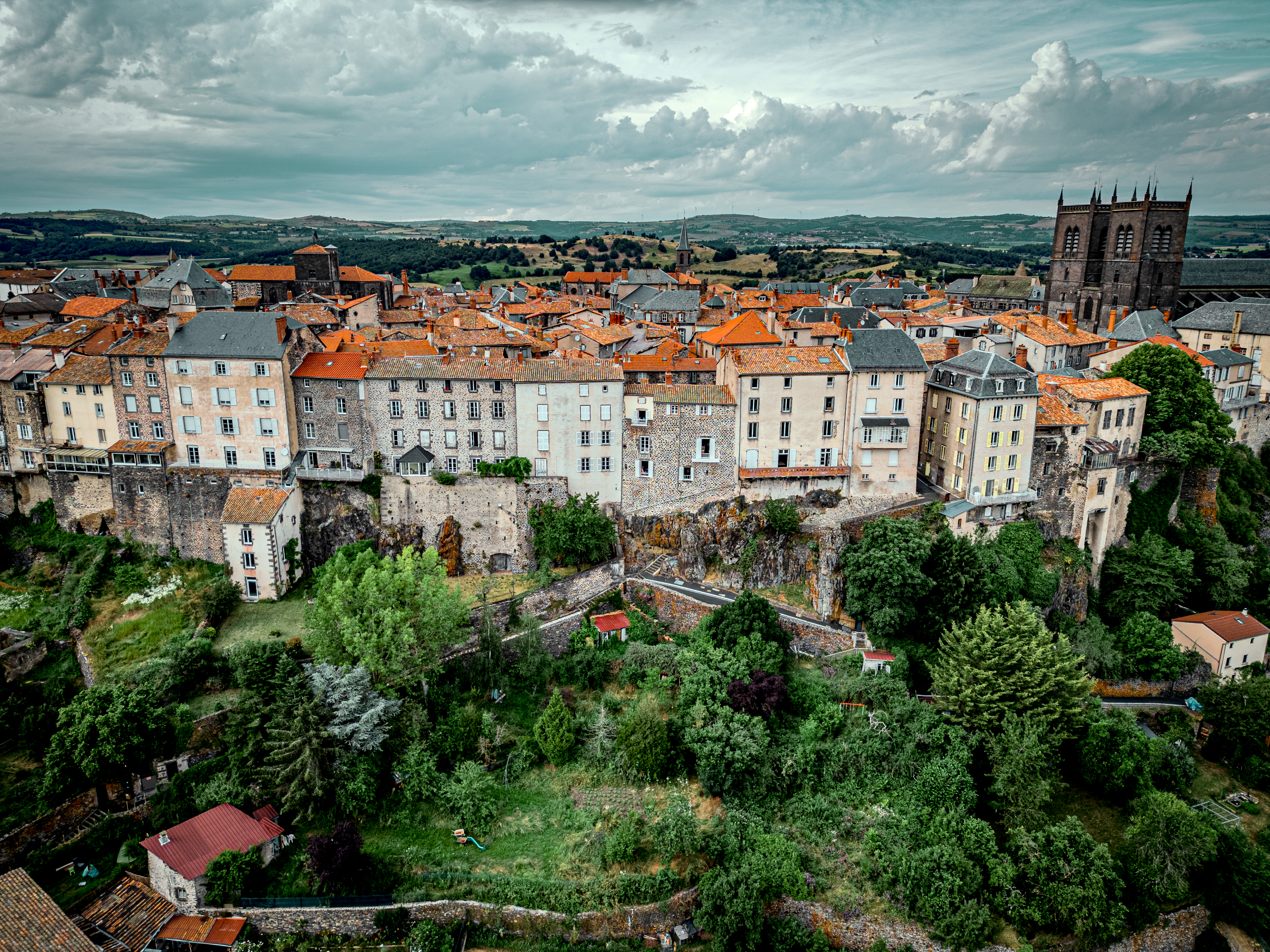
Skyline of the upper town

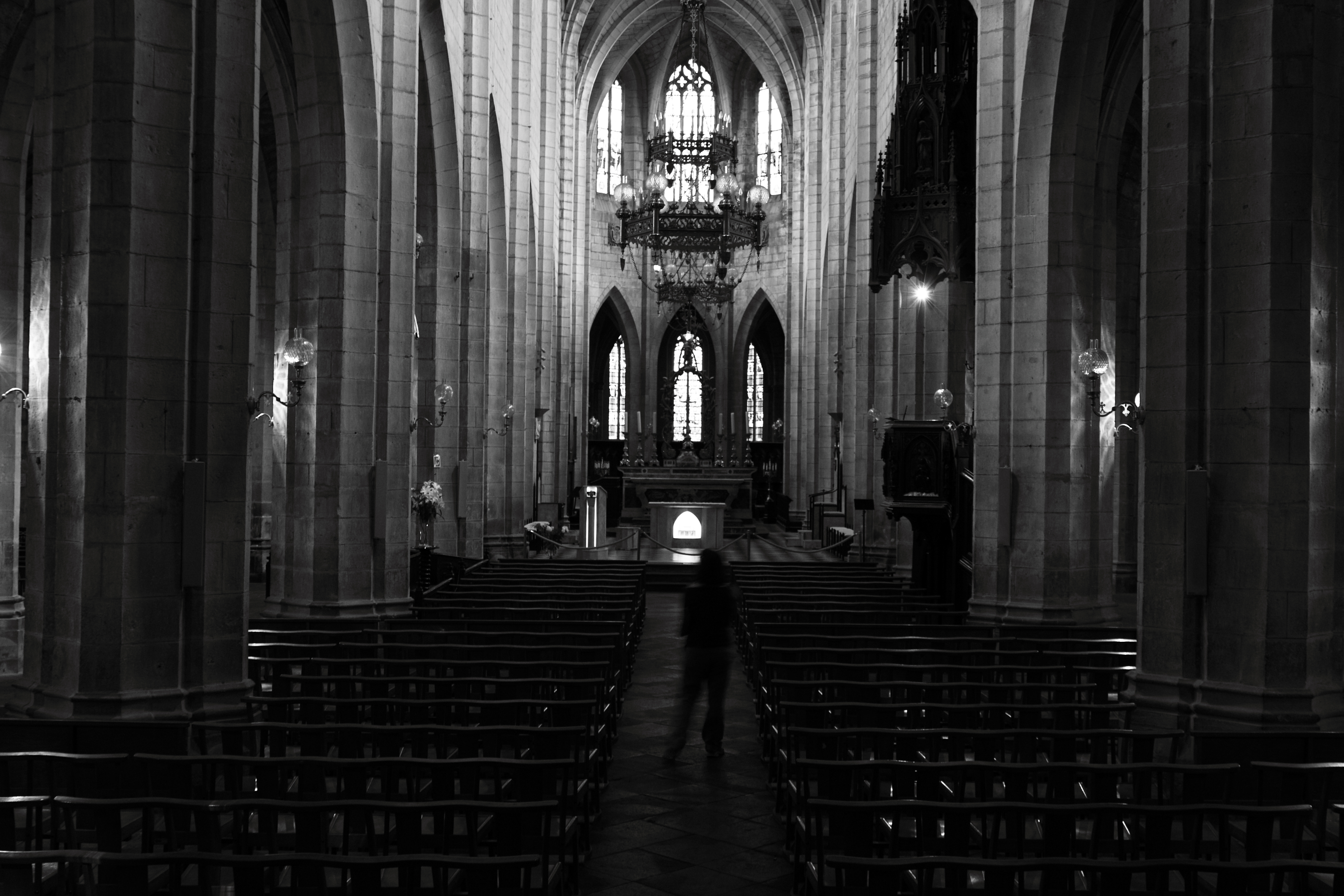
Saint-Flour Cathedral

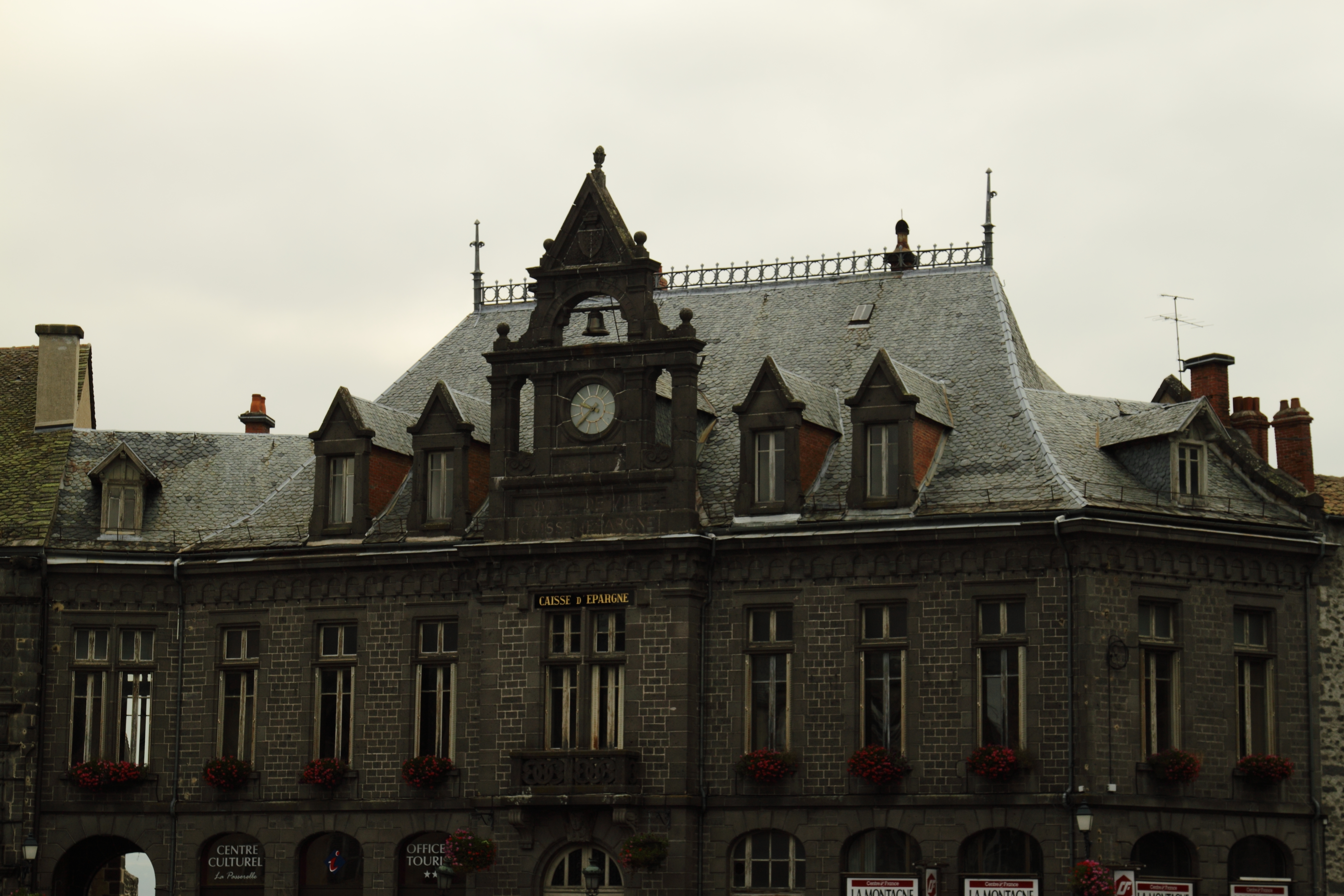
Tourist office

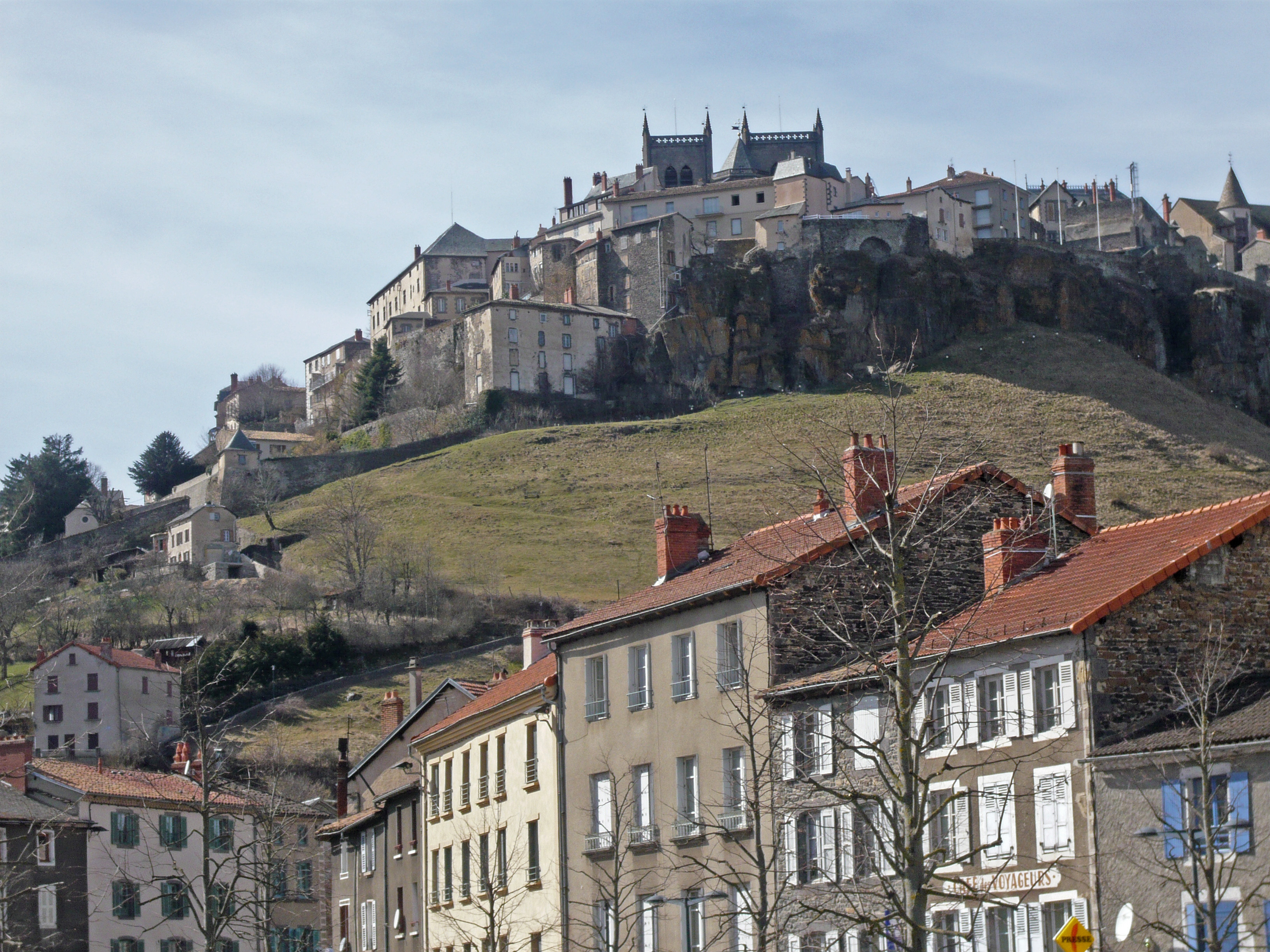
The upper part of the town with its wall

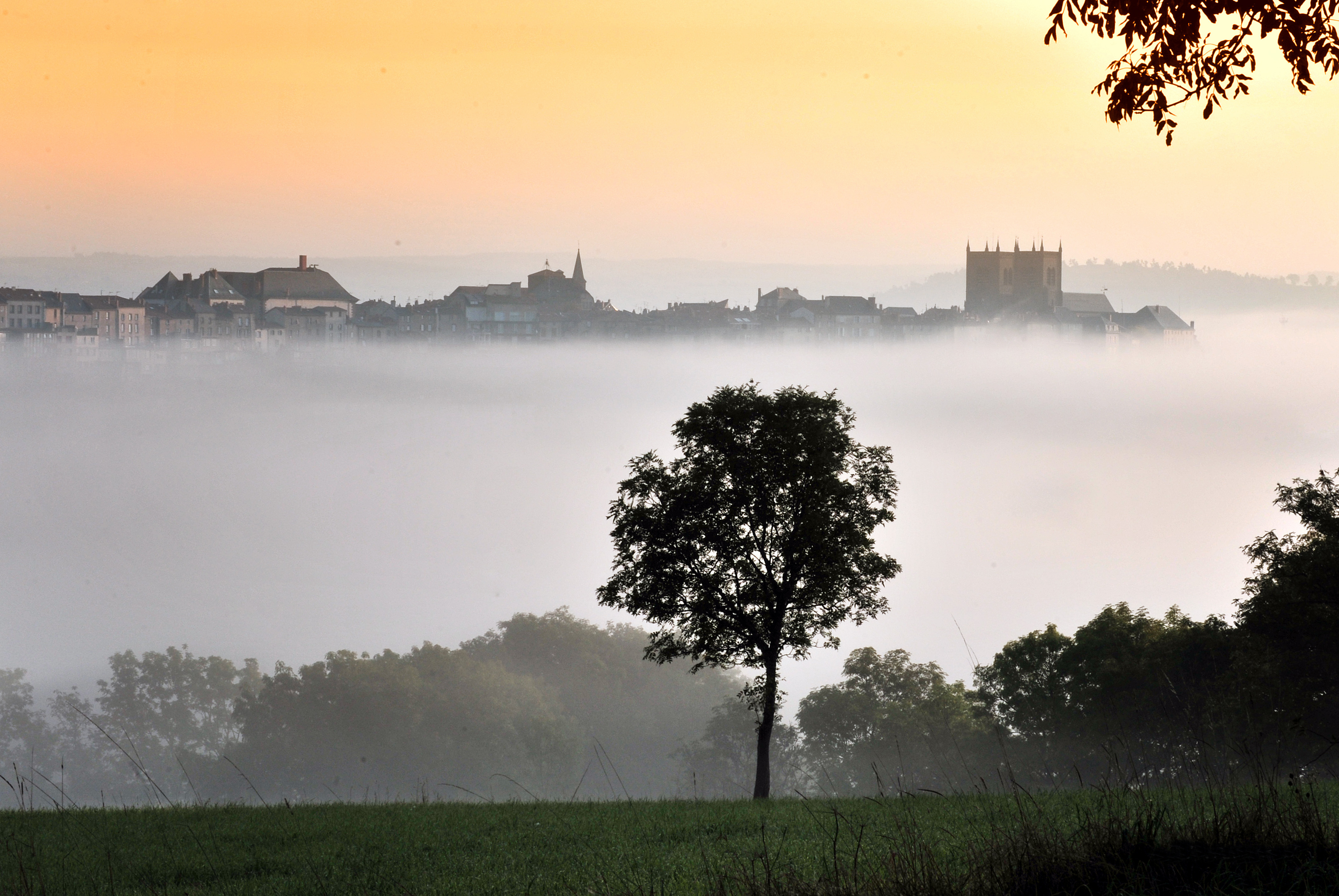
Upper part of the town in the mist

== See also ==
- Roman Catholic Diocese of Saint-Flour
- Saint-Flour Cathedral
