= Ferenc Salamon (water polo) =

Hungarian water polo player

Ferenc Salamon is a Hungarian former water polo player, Olympian, and physician.

== Playing career ==
Salamon started playing water polo in 1949, and joined the Hungarian National Team and won a silver medal at the Universiade Games in Paris. He retired from playing in 1966 but remained active in the sport.

== Later career ==
Salamon became a referee and officiated at the 1972 Summer Olympics in Munich. He organized, directed, or officiated many water polo events between 1970 and 2004, including ten Olympic Games and every World championship.

Salamon is also a hospital physician.

In 2019, he was inducted into the International Swimming Hall of Fame.
