= Florus of Lodève =

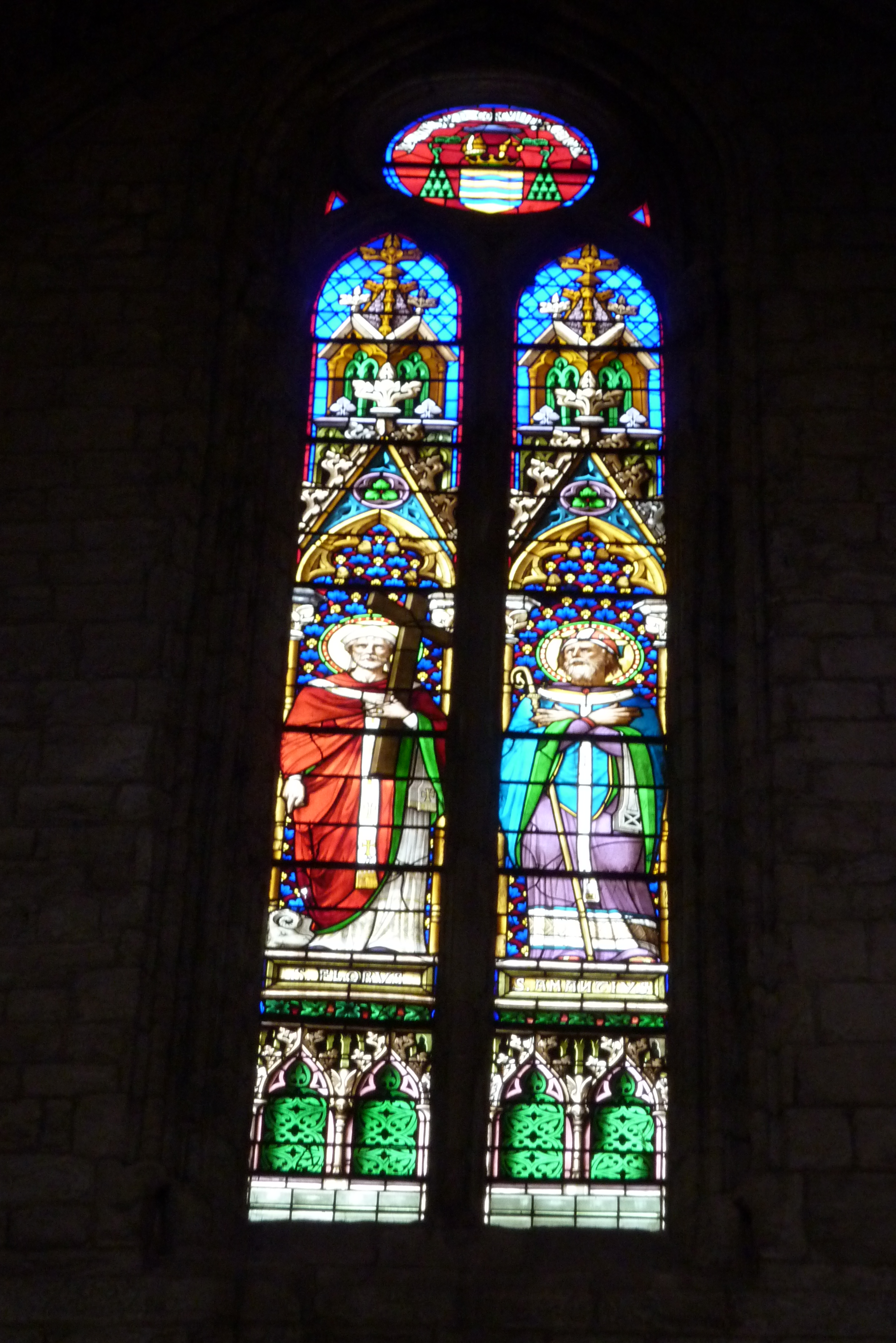
- Saint Florus (left) depicted next to Saint Amantius, Lodève Cathedral
- Born: France
- Died: 389 AD
- Feast: 1 June, 4 November

Saint Florus (French: Saint Flour) (died c. 389) was the legendary first bishop of Lodève. He evangelised in Languedoc and the Auvergne, and was martyred in about 389.

His historical record is unclear. The first written references only appear in the 10th century, and the first vita was added to Bernard Gui's collection of the lives of saints Speculum sanctorale in the 14th century.

His tomb was the origin of a monastery, re-founded in the 11th century by Saint Odilo of Cluny, fifth abbot of Cluny. Around this abbey there grew the town of Saint-Flour, later the seat of the diocese of the same name, of which Florus is the patron saint.

His feast is kept either on 1 June or on 4 November.
