= Ferenc Salamon (historian) =

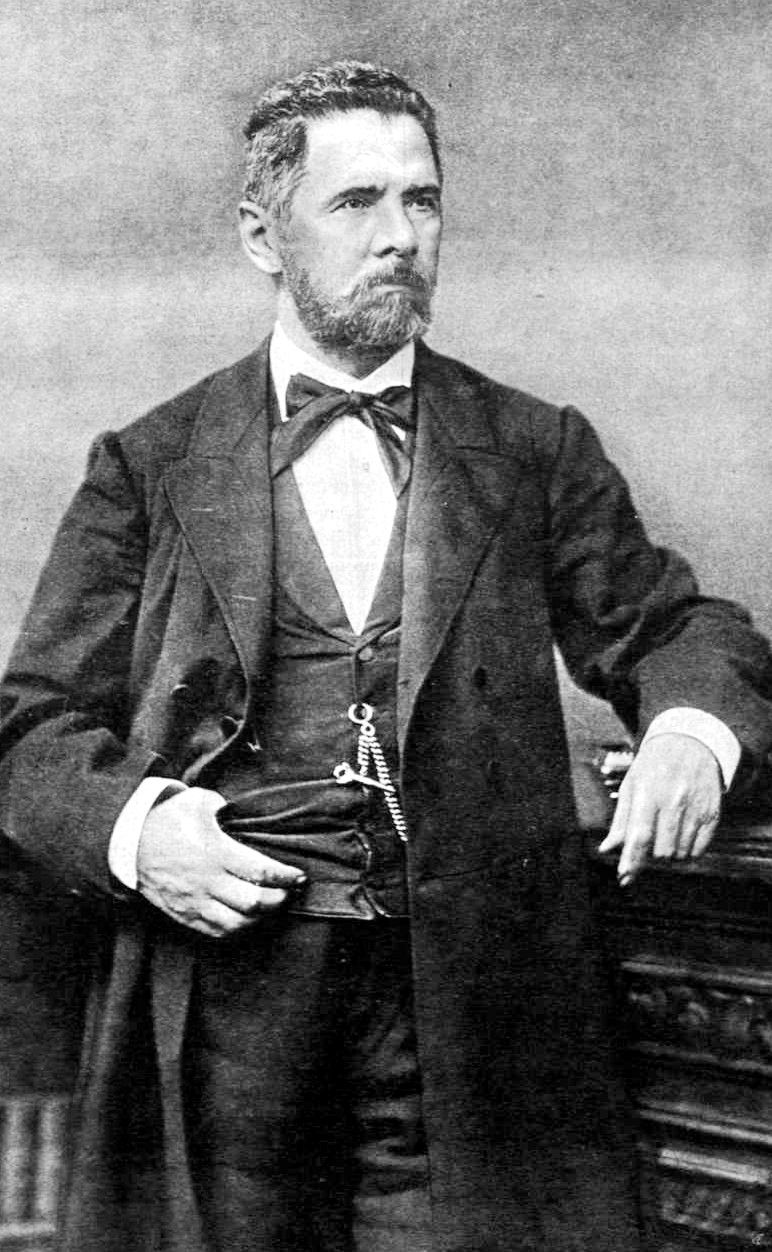
- Born: August 29, 1825; Déva, Austrian Empire
- Died: October 9, 1892 (aged 67); Budapest, Austria-Hungary

Ferenc Salamon (1825-1892) was a historian, translator, and literary critic known for his writings on Ottoman Hungary.

== Career ==
In 1854, Ferenc went to Pest (now Budapest) and worked as a journalist for various magazines. In 1870, be was named Professor of Hungarian History at the University of Pest.
