= Studley Priory =

Studley Priory may refer to:

- Studley Priory, Oxfordshire
- Studley Priory, Warwickshire

== See also ==
- Studley (disambiguation)
- Priory (disambiguation)
