= Priory Church =

Priory Church is the name of many Christian churches which have had a connection with a priory.

Examples (arranged by order of country, then place-name) include:

== France ==
- Saint-Michel de Grandmont Priory, Saint-Privat, Hérault

== Spain ==
- Priory Church, El Puerto de Santa María

== United Kingdom ==
When monasteries were closed in the Protestant Reformation of the sixteenth century, the churches were often given a new role as parish churches. At Oxford a priory church became the city's cathedral.

While priory churches are usually associated with former priories rather than active priories, a few priories have been constructed since the Reformation, for example St Dominic's Priory Church.

- Priory Church of St Mary, Abergavenny
- St Mary's Church, Bungay
- Bridlington Priory
- Cartmel Priory
- Christchurch Priory
- Dunstable Priory
- Edington Priory
- Priory Church of St George, Dunster
- Lancaster Priory
- Priory Church of St. Anthony, Lenton
- Priory Church, Leominster
- St Bartholomew-the-Great, London
- St Dominic's Priory Church, London
- Clerkenwell Priory (Priory Church of St John of Jerusalem), London
- Oxford Cathedral (Priory Church of St Frideswide)
- Priory of St. Andrews of the Ards, Stogursey
- Priory Church of St. Peter, Thurgarton

== See also ==
- List of English abbeys, priories and friaries serving as parish churches
