= Priory (disambiguation) =

A priory is a house of men or women under religious vows headed by a prior or prioress.

Priory may also refer to:

== Places ==
- Priory (Abergavenny ward), an electoral district in Monmouthshire, Wales
- Priory, Pembrokeshire, a location in Wales
- Priory (Trafford ward), electoral district in Manchester, England
- Priory, an electoral ward for the town council in Lewes, East Sussex, England

== Arts and culture ==
- Priory (band), an American rock band
- The Priory (play), a 2009 play by Michael Wynne
- Priory Records, a British record label
- Priory: The Only Home I've Got, a 1978 Canadian documentary film
- The Priory, a Channel 4 television series hosted by Zoe Ball and Jamie Theakston

== Buildings ==
- The Priory, Balham, London, listed building, scene of a notorious 1876 poisoning
- The Priory, Brighton, England, also known as Gothic House
- The Priory, Burwood, Australia, a heritage-listed residence
- The Priory, Gladesville, Australia, a heritage-listed building
- The Priory, York, England, a pub
- Priory Hospital, a London mental health hospital commonly known as The Priory
- Priory Palace, Gatchina, Russia
- Monmouth Priory, Monmouth, Wales

== See also ==
- Priory Church (disambiguation)
- Priory School (disambiguation)
