= Cloister =

Open space surrounded by covered walks or open galleries

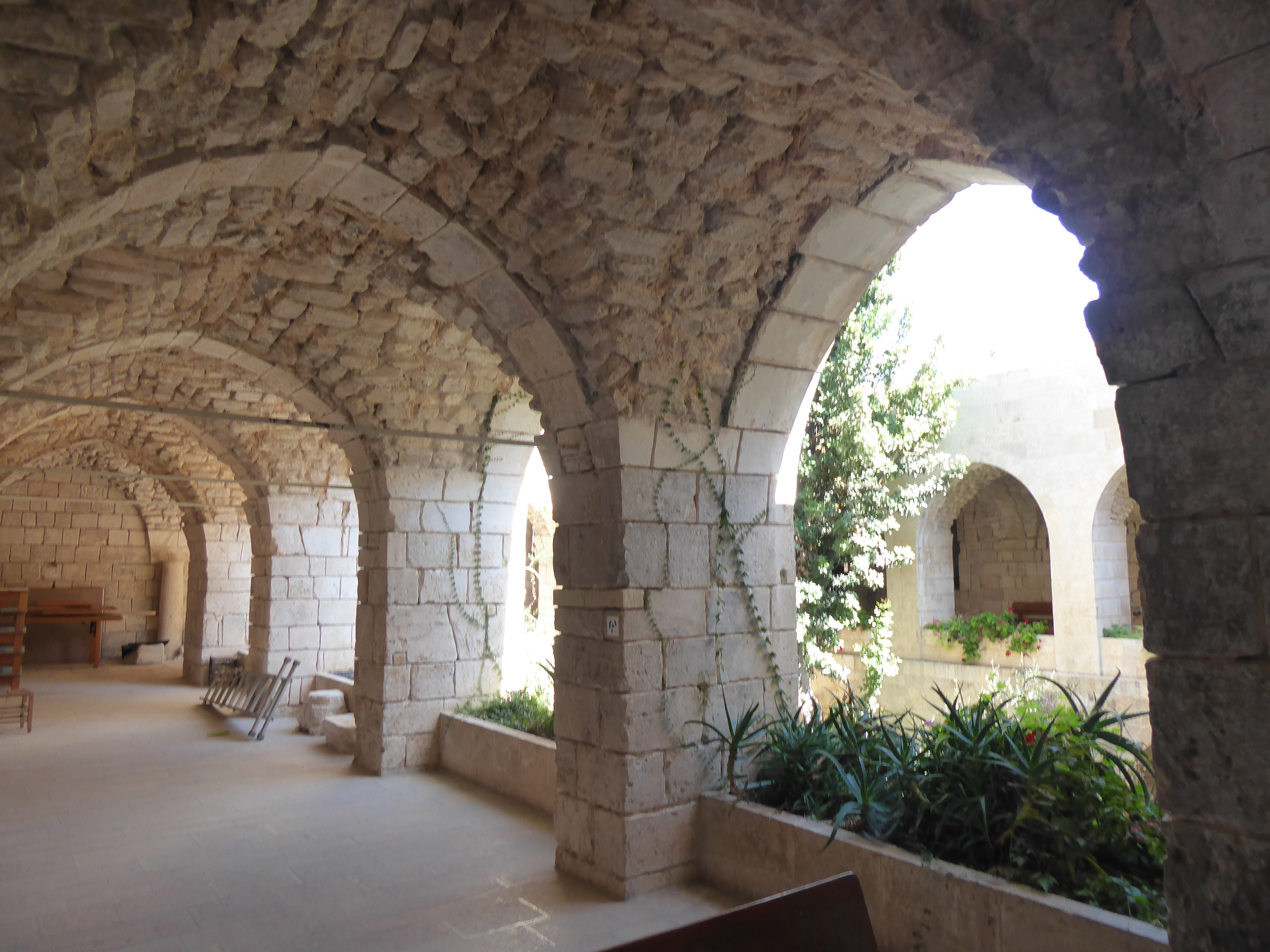
The cloister at the Evangelical-Lutheran Church of the Redeemer, Jerusalem

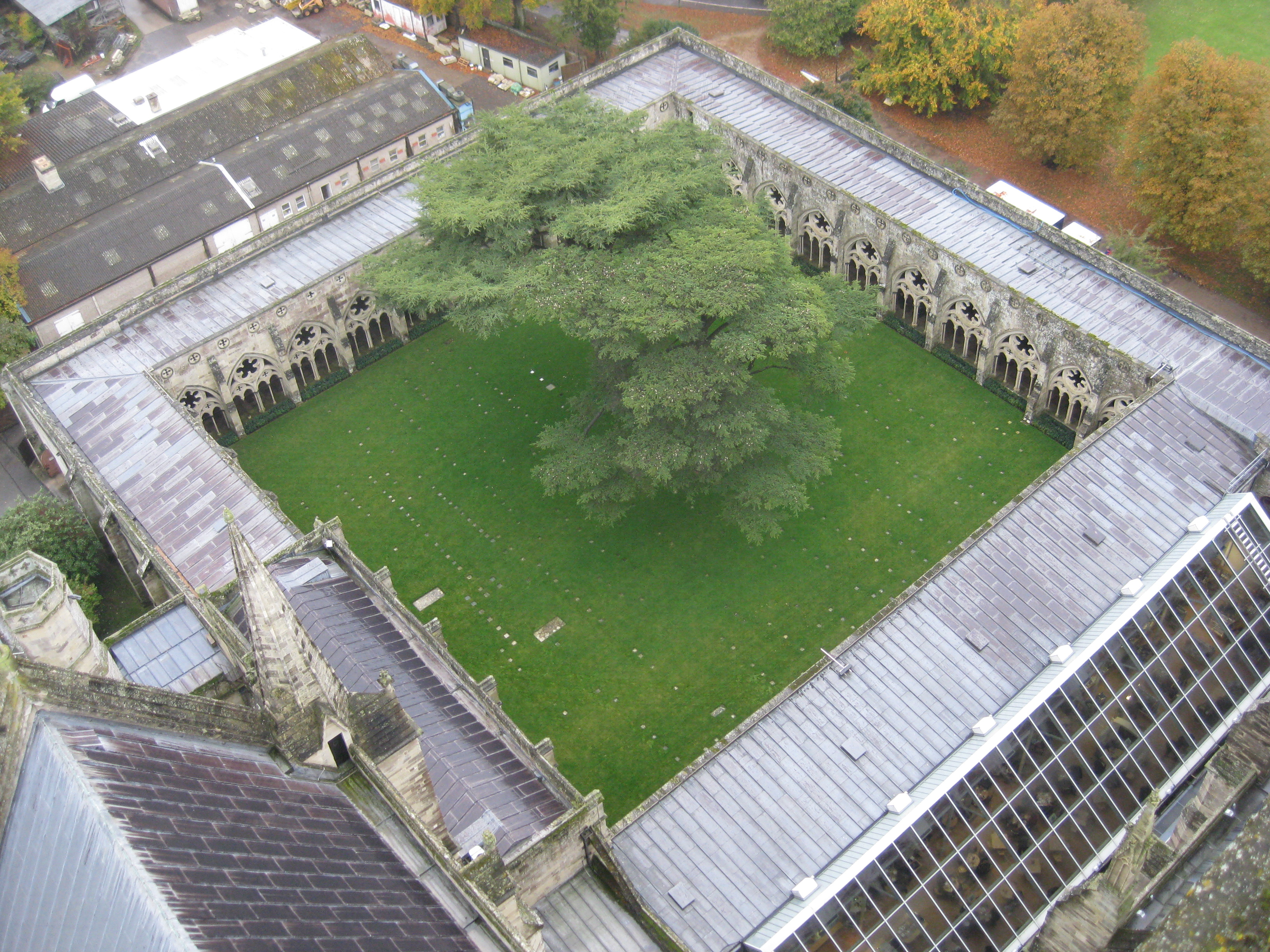
The cloister (1240) at Salisbury Cathedral, England

A cloister (from Latin claustrum 'enclosure') is a covered walk, open gallery, or open arcade running along the walls of buildings and forming a quadrangle or garth. The attachment of a cloister to a cathedral or church, commonly against a warm southern flank, usually indicates that it is (or once was) part of a monastic foundation, "forming a continuous and solid architectural barrier... that effectively separates the world of the monks from that of the serfs and workmen, whose lives and works went forward outside and around the cloister."

Cloistered (or claustral) life is also another name for the monastic life of a monk or nun. The English term enclosure is used in contemporary Catholic church law translations to mean cloistered, and some form of the Latin parent word "claustrum" is frequently used as a metonymic name for monastery in languages such as German. Cloistered clergy refers to monastic orders that strictly separate themselves from the affairs of the external world.

== History of the cloister ==
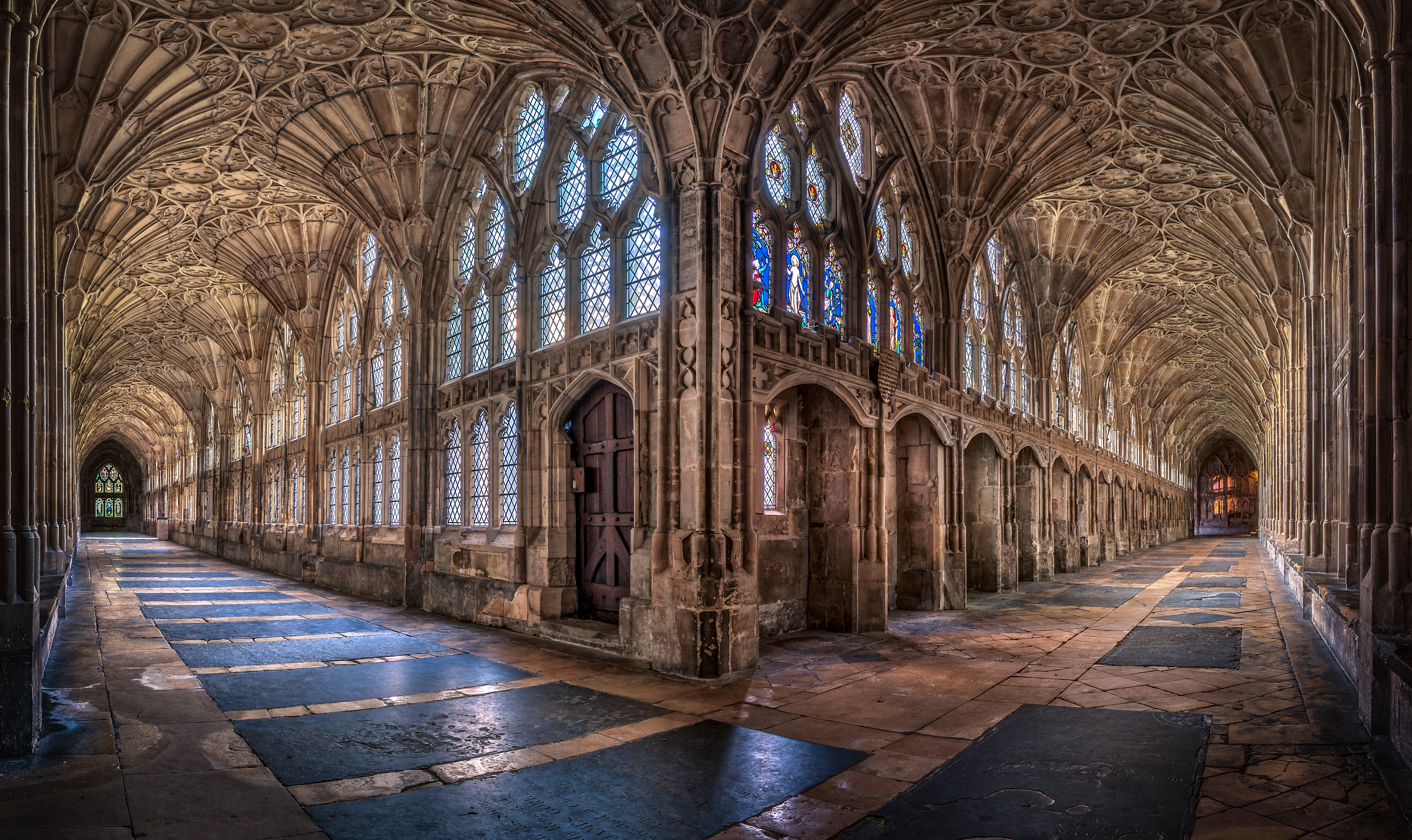
The Cloisters (1351–77) at Gloucester Cathedral, UK

The early medieval cloister had several antecedents: the peristyle court of the Roman domus, the atrium and its expanded version that served as forecourt to early Christian basilicas, and certain semi-galleried courts attached to the flanks of early Syrian churches. Walter Horn suggests that the earliest coenobitic communities, which were established in Egypt by Saint Pachomius c. 320, did not result in cloister construction, as there were no lay serfs attached to the community of monks, and thus no need for separation within the walled community.

Horn finds the earliest prototypical cloisters in some exceptional late fifth-century monastic churches in southern Syria, such as the Convent of Saints Sergius and Bacchus, at Umm-is-Surab (489), and the colonnaded forecourt of the convent of Id-Dêr, but nothing similar appeared in the semi-eremitic Irish monasteries' clustered roundhouses nor in the earliest Benedictine collective communities of the West.

In the time of Charlemagne (r. 768–814) the requirements of a separate monastic community within an extended and scattered manorial estate led to the development of a "monastery within a monastery" in the form of the locked cloister, an architectural solution allowing the monks to perform their sacred tasks apart from the distractions of laymen and servants. Horn offers as early examples Abbot Gundeland's "Altenmünster" of Lorsch abbey (765–774), as revealed in the excavations by Frederich Behn. Lorsch was adapted without substantial alteration from a Frankish nobleman's villa rustica, in a tradition unbroken from late Roman times.

Another early cloister, in the abbey of Saint-Riquier (790–799), took a triangular shape, with chapels at the corners, in conscious representation of the Trinity. A square cloister sited against the flank of the abbey church was built at Inden (816) and the abbey of St. Wandrille at Fontenelle (823–833). At Fulda, a new cloister (819) was sited to the liturgical west of the church "in the Roman manner" familiar from the forecourt of Old St. Peter's Basilica because it would be closer to the relics. More recently, John D. Rockefeller Jr. commissioned the construction of The Cloisters museum and gardens in medieval style in Manhattan in 1930–1938.

== Gallery ==
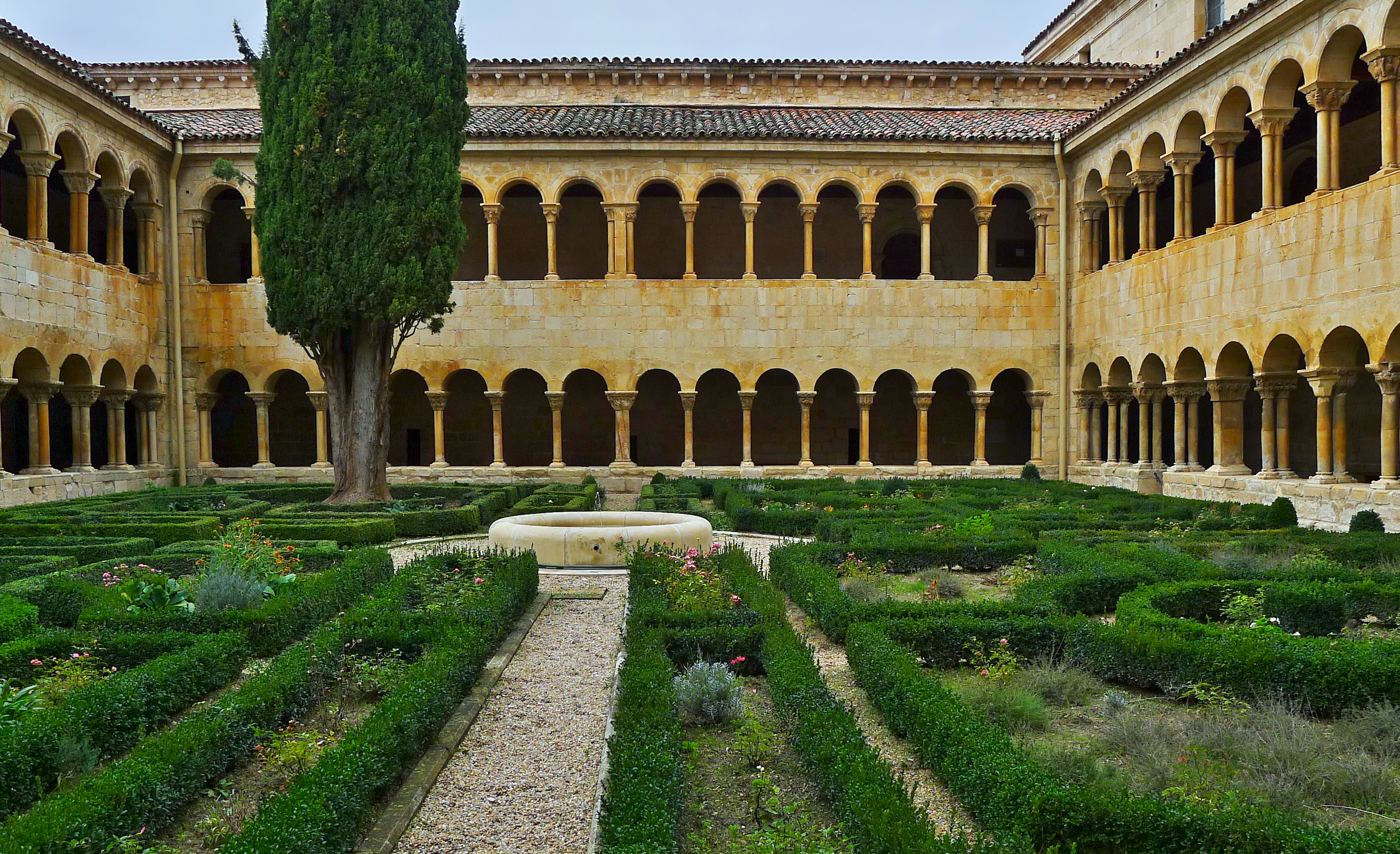
The Romanesque cloister (between 1075–1150) of Santo Domingo de Silos, Spain

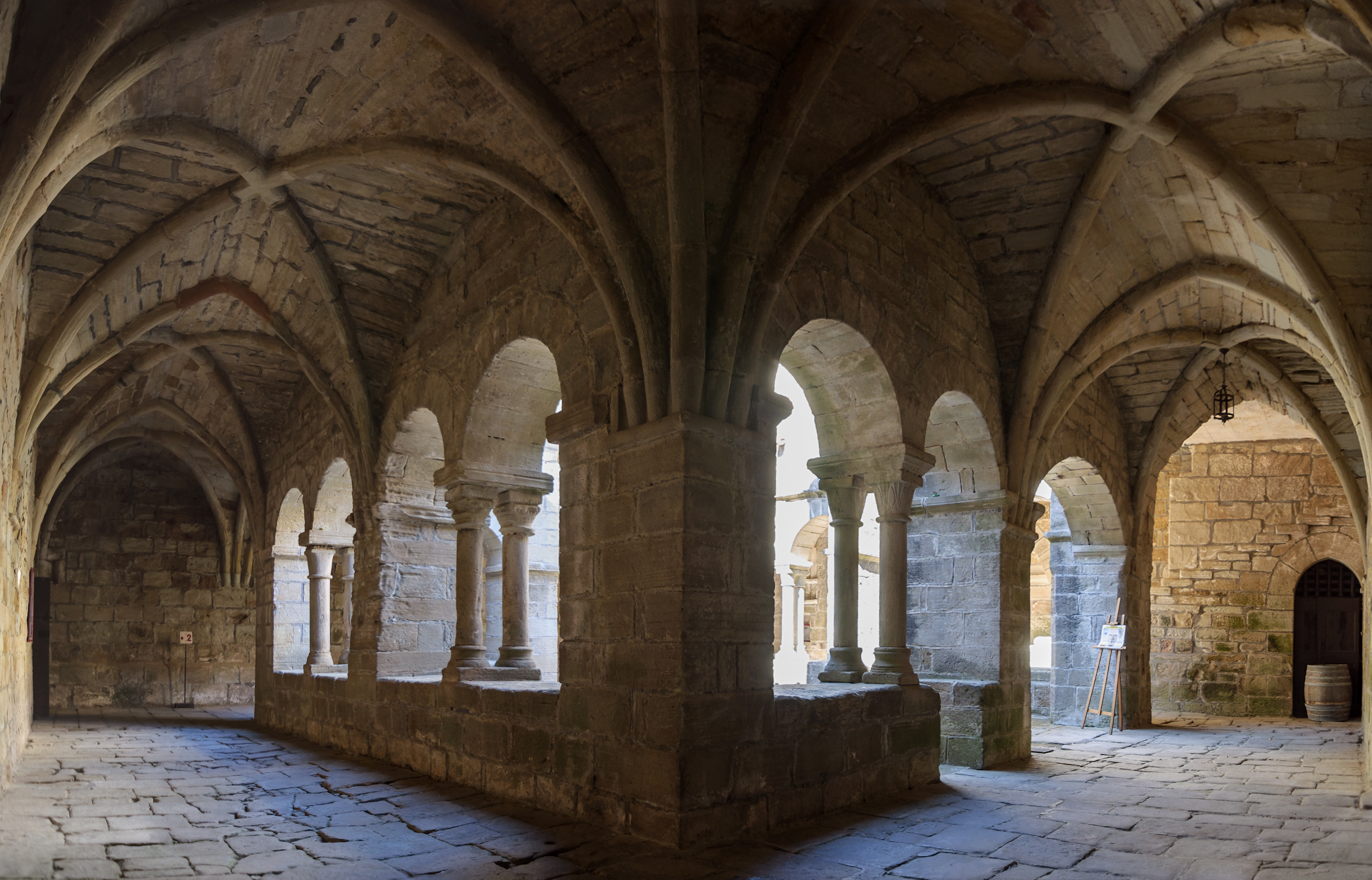
Cloister of Saint-Michel de Grandmont Priory (est. 1128), Languedoc-Roussillon, France

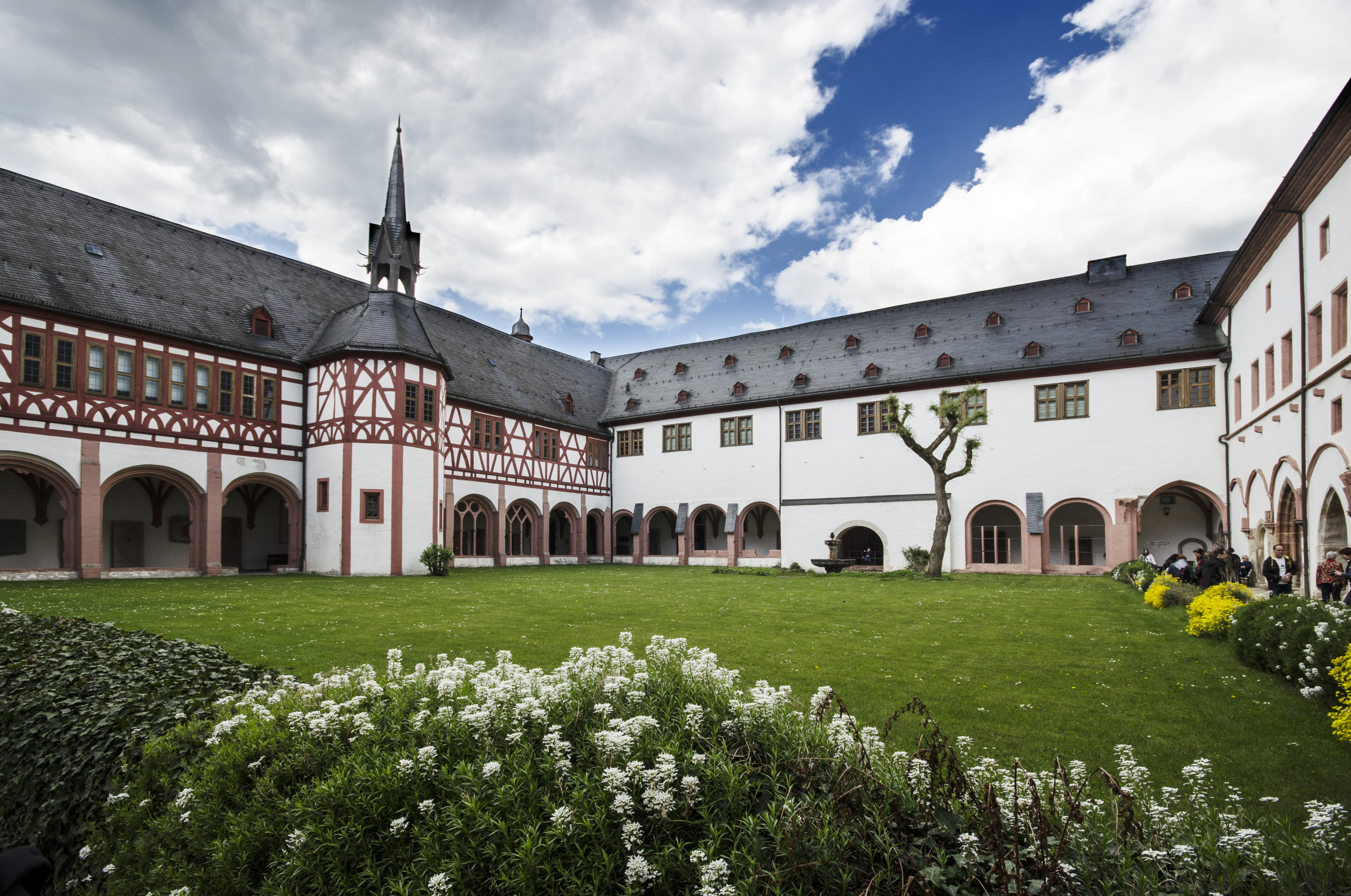
Cloister (12th/13th and 19th century) of the former Cistercian Eberbach Abbey, Germany

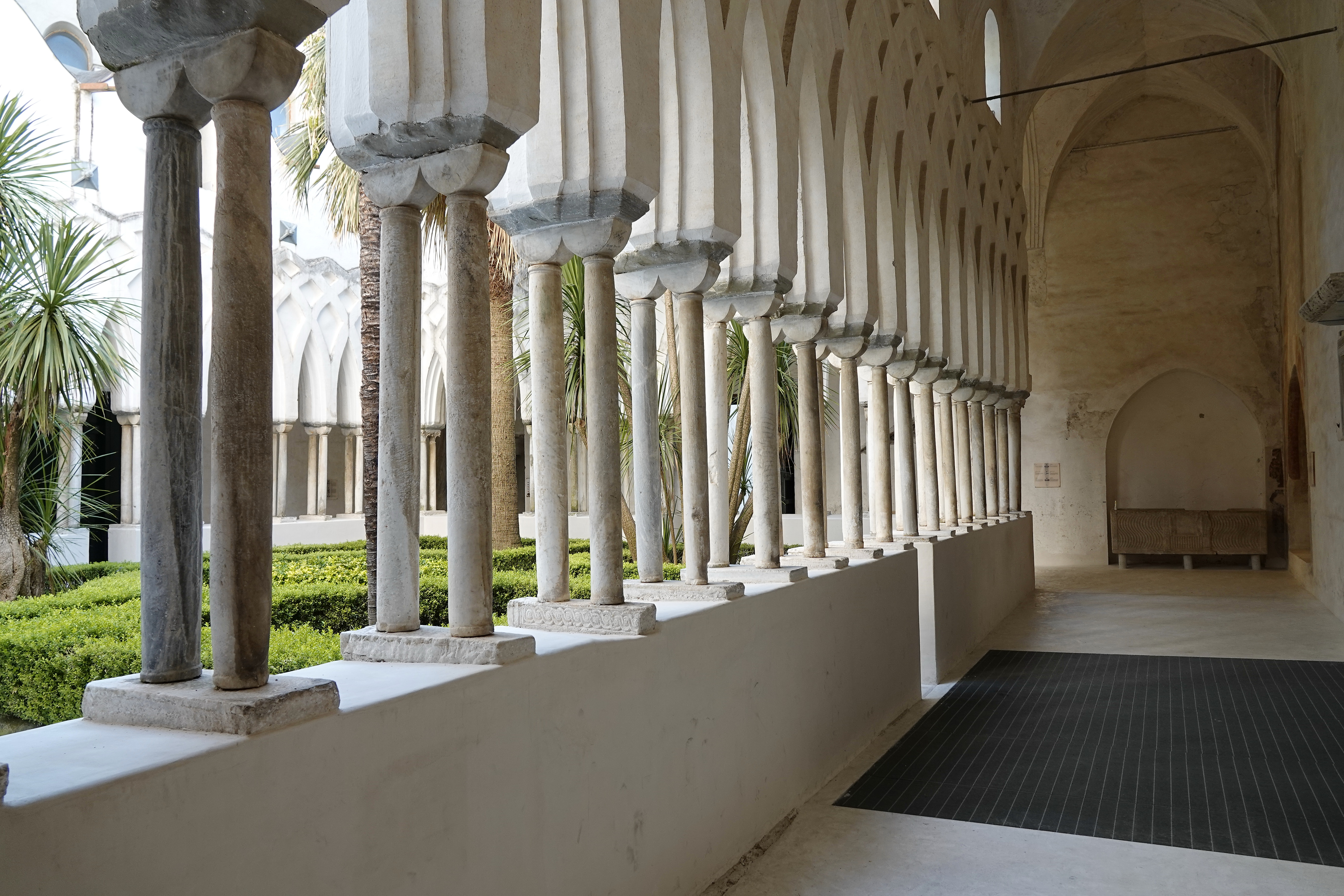
Chiostro del Paradiso (1268), Amalfi Cathedral, Italy

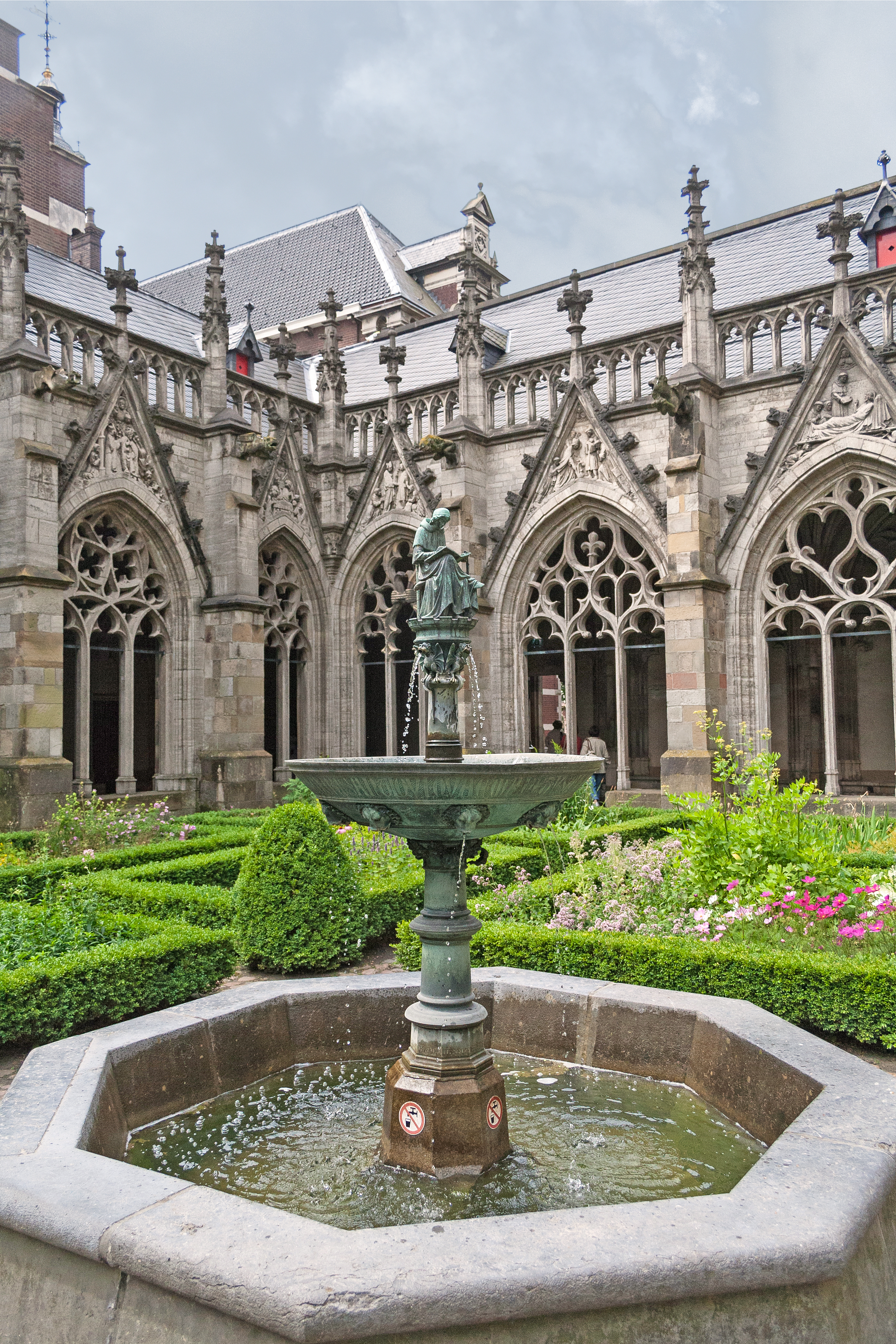
Cloister (1254–1500) of the St. Martin's Cathedral, Utrecht, Netherlands

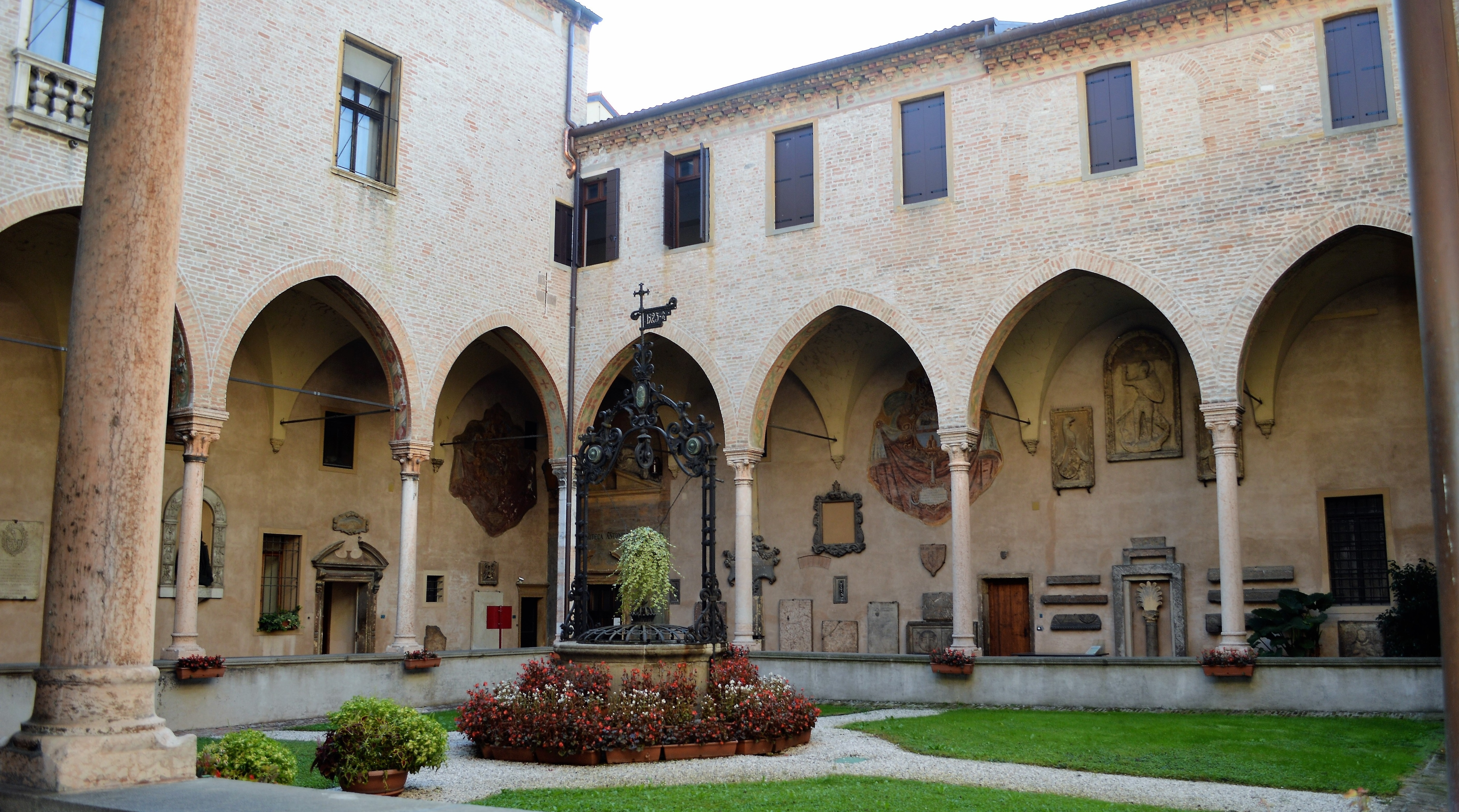
Cloister of the General (1435), one of five cloisters at Basilica of Saint Anthony, Padua

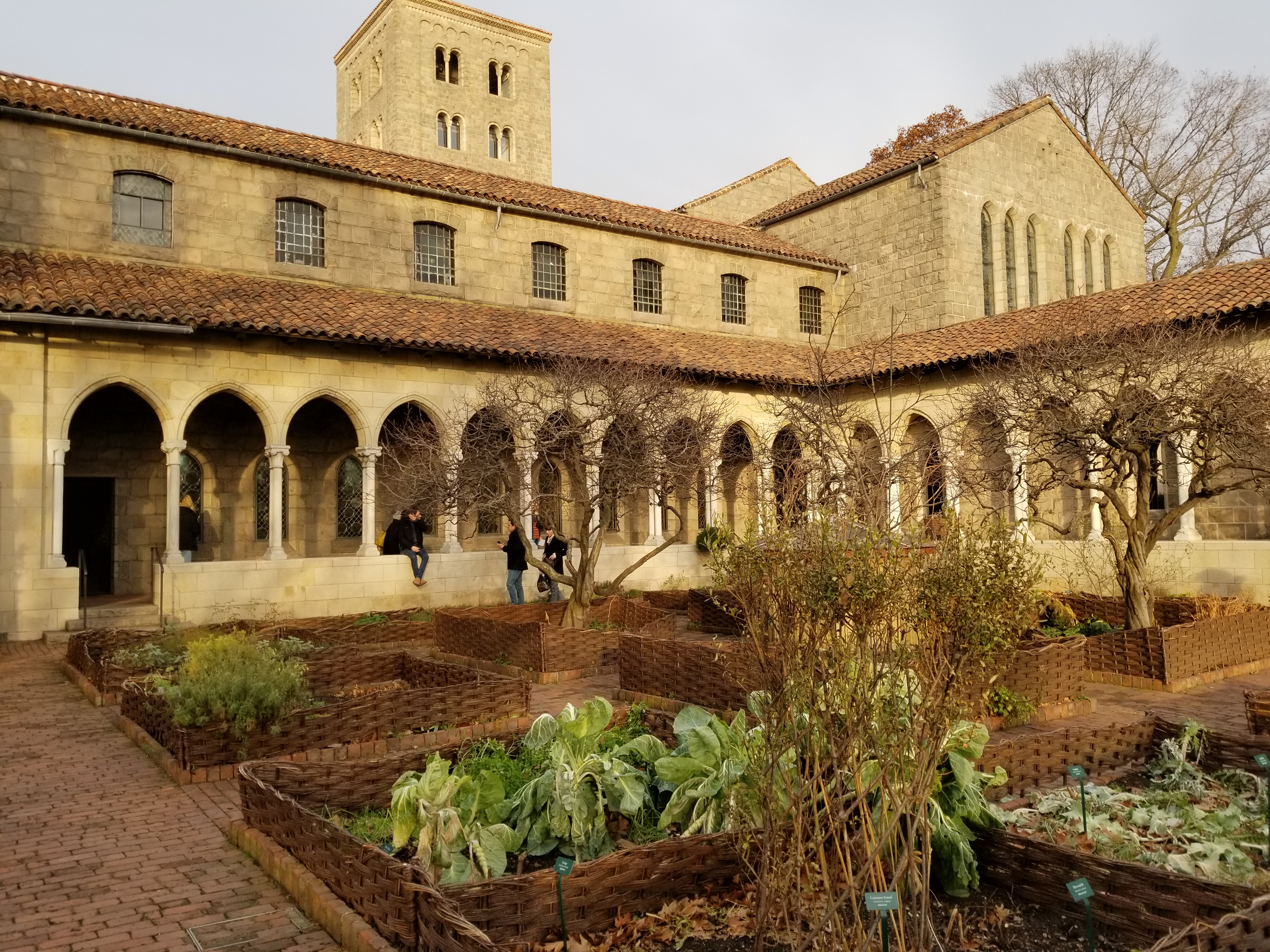
The Bonnefont medieval garden at The Cloisters in Manhattan (1930–1938)

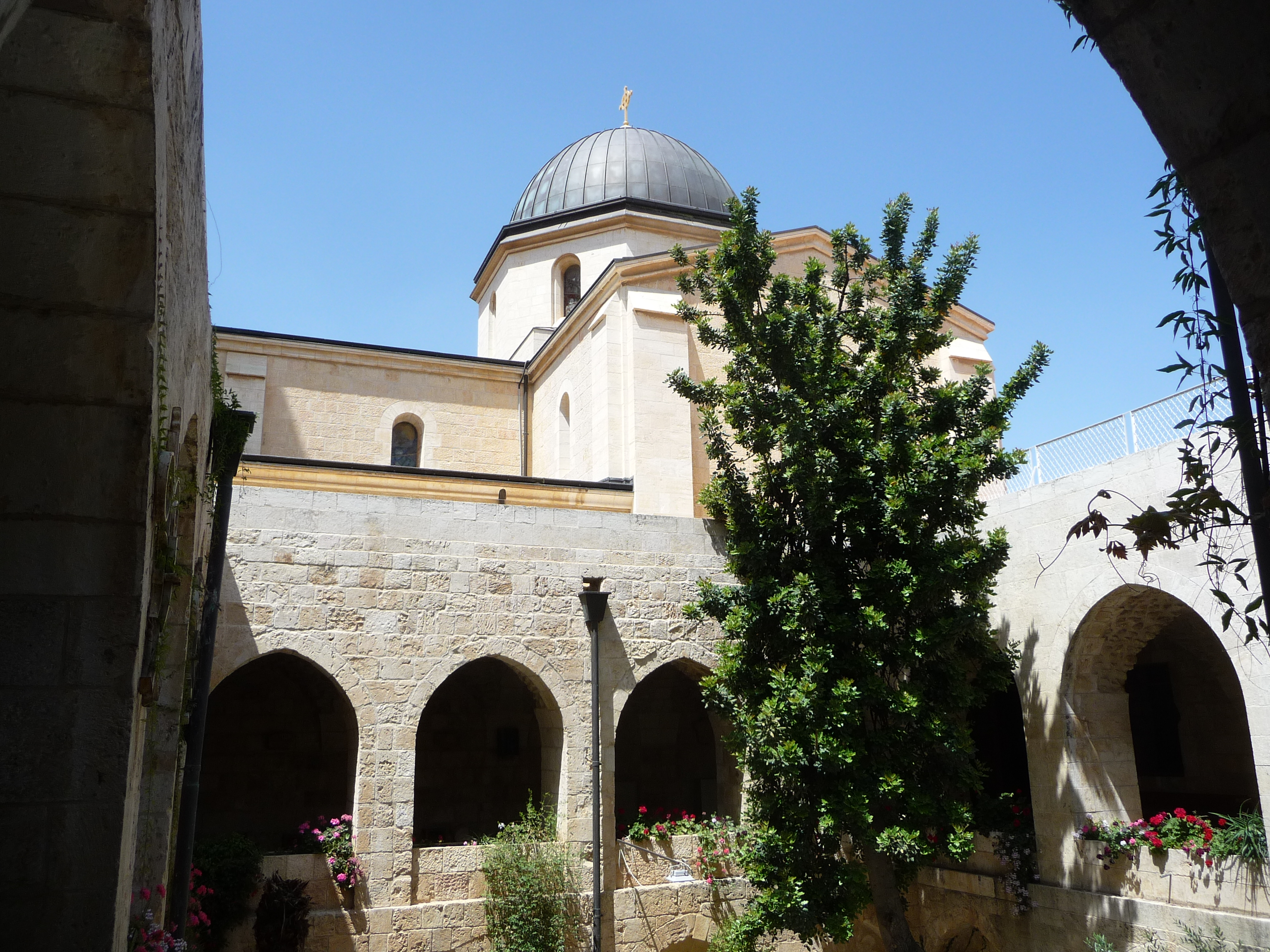
Cloister at the Evangelical-Lutheran Church of the Redeemer in Jerusalem

== See also ==
- Colonnade
