= Studley =

Studley may refer to:

== Places ==
=== Australia ===
- Studley Park, Yarra Bend Park, Melbourne
- Studley Park, Narellan, New South Wales

=== England ===
- Studley, Oxfordshire
  - Studley Priory, Oxfordshire
- Studley, Warwickshire
  - Studley Priory, Warwickshire
- Studley, Wiltshire
- Studley Green, Buckinghamshire
- Studley Green, Wiltshire
- Studley Royal Park, North Yorkshire
- Lower Studley, Wiltshire
- Upper Studley, Wiltshire

=== United States ===
- Studley, Kansas
- Studley, Virginia
- Studleys Pond, Rockland, Massachusetts

== Organisations ==
- Studley College, former college in Warwickshire
- Studley F.C., football club in Warwickshire
- Studley High School, a secondary school in Warwickshire
- Savills Studley, international commercial real estate firm

== People ==
- Studley (surname), a surname and list of people with the name
