= Priory School =

Priory School may refer to several schools:

== Jamaica ==
- Priory School (Kingston)

== United Kingdom ==
=== England ===
- Priory School, Isle of Wight, an independent school in Whippingham, Isle of Wight
- Priory School, Lewes, a comprehensive secondary school in Lewes, Sussex
- Harris Academy Orpington, formerly The Priory School, a comprehensive secondary school in Orpington, London Borough of Bromley
- Priory School, Portsmouth, a secondary school in Southsea, Hampshire
- Priory Community School, a secondary school in Weston-super-Mare, North Somerset
- Priory Preparatory School, Banstead, Surrey
- The Priory School, Dorking, a comprehensive secondary school in Dorking, Surrey
- The Priory School, Hitchin, a comprehensive secondary school in Hitchin, Hertfordshire
- The Priory School, Shrewsbury, a secondary school in Shrewsbury, Shropshire

== United States ==
- Saint Louis Priory School, a Roman Catholic boys' school in St. Louis, Missouri
- Woodside Priory School, a Roman Catholic school in Portola Valley, California, known locally as The Priory

== Other uses ==
- The Adventure of the Priory School, a short story by Sir Arthur Conan Doyle
- Royal and Prior School, in Raphoe, Ireland, created by a 1971 merger of the Royal School in Raphoe and the Prior School in Lifford
