= Saint-Privat, Hérault =

Saint-Privat
- Commune
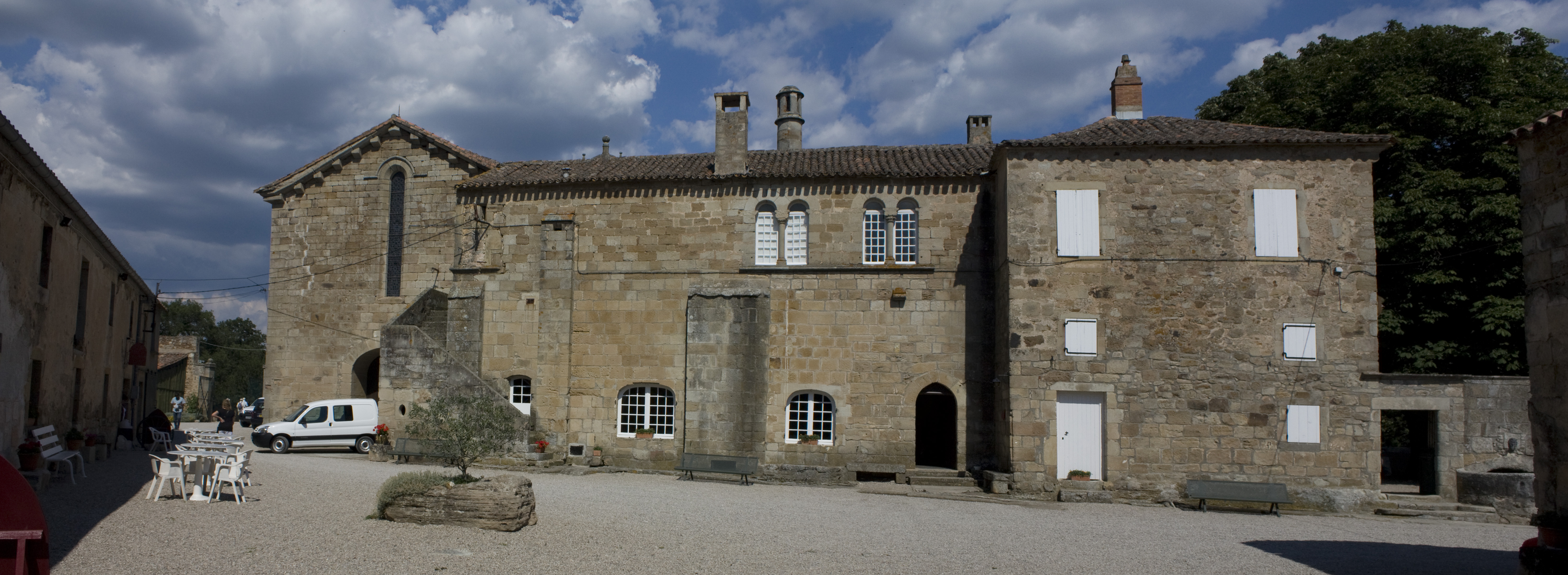
- Priory of Saint-Michel de Grandmont

- Coat of arms
- Location of Saint-Privat
- Location within France Location within Occitanie
- Coordinates: 43°45′14″N 3°25′33″E
- Country: France
- Region: Occitania
- Department: Hérault
- Arrondissement: Lodève
- Canton: Lodève
- Intercommunality: Lodévois-Larzac

Government
  - Mayor (2020–2026): Samuel Goudou
- Area^{1}: 26.9 km^{2} (10.4 sq mi)
- Elevation: 300 m (980 ft)
- Highest elevation: 782 m (2,566 ft)
- Lowest elevation: 197 m (646 ft)
- Population (2023): 461
  - Density: 17.1/km^{2} (44.4/sq mi)
- Time zone: UTC+01:00 (CET)
  - Summer (DST): UTC+02:00 (CEST)
- INSEE/Postal code: 34286 /34700
- ^{1} French Land Register data, which excludes lakes, ponds, glaciers > 1 km^{2} (0.386 sq mi or 247 acres) and river estuaries.

Saint-Privat (French pronunciation: [sɛ̃ pʁiva]; Occitan: Sant Privat) is a commune in the Hérault department in the Occitanie region in southern France.

The Saint-Michel at Grandmont Priory is located in the commune.

== Population ==
Historical population
Year	Pop.	±% p.a.
1968	183	—
1975	160	−1.90%
1982	164	+0.35%
1990	197	+2.32%
1999	218	+1.13%
2007	381	+7.23%
2012	417	+1.82%
2017	404	−0.63%
2023	461	+2.22%
Source: INSEE

== See also ==
- Communes of the Hérault department
