= Saint-Michel de Grandmont Priory =

Priory in Hérault, France

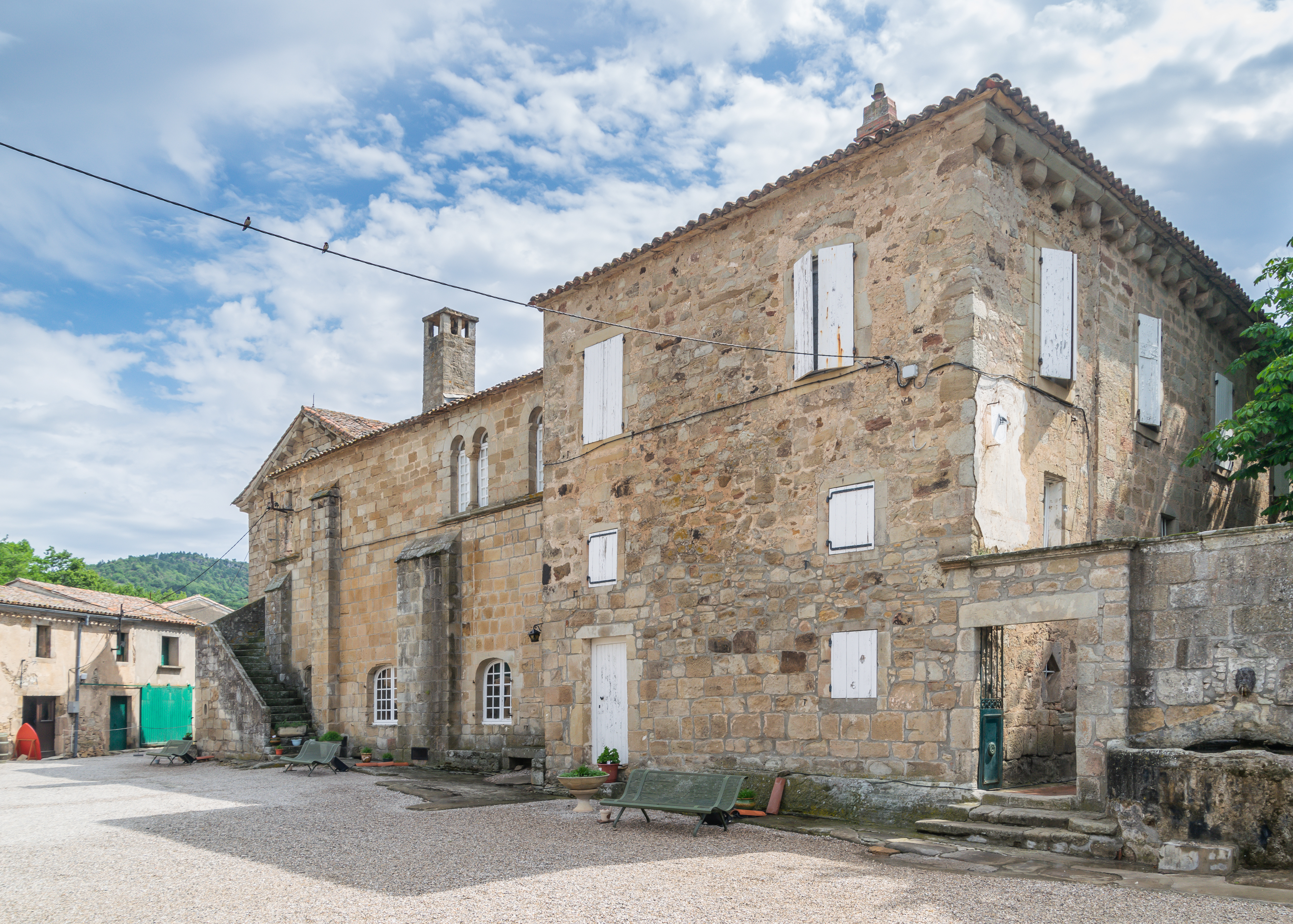

- Location within France

Monastery information
- Order: Grandmontines
- Established: 1128
- Disestablished: 1772
- Diocese: Lodève

People
- Founder: Étienne of Thiers

Site
- Location: Lodève, Hérault, France
- Coordinates: 43°44′2″N 3°22′8″E
- Website: www.prieure-grandmont.fr

Monument historique
- Official name: Saint-Michel de Grandmont Priory
- Type: Classé
- Designated: 1887
- Reference no.: PA00103713

Saint-Michel de Grandmont Priory (French: Prieuré Saint-Michel de Grandmont) is a former monastery of the Order of Grandmont in the commune of Saint-Privat, in Hérault, France. The priory is located in a wild area at the heart of an oak forest, about 10 km from the town of Lodève.

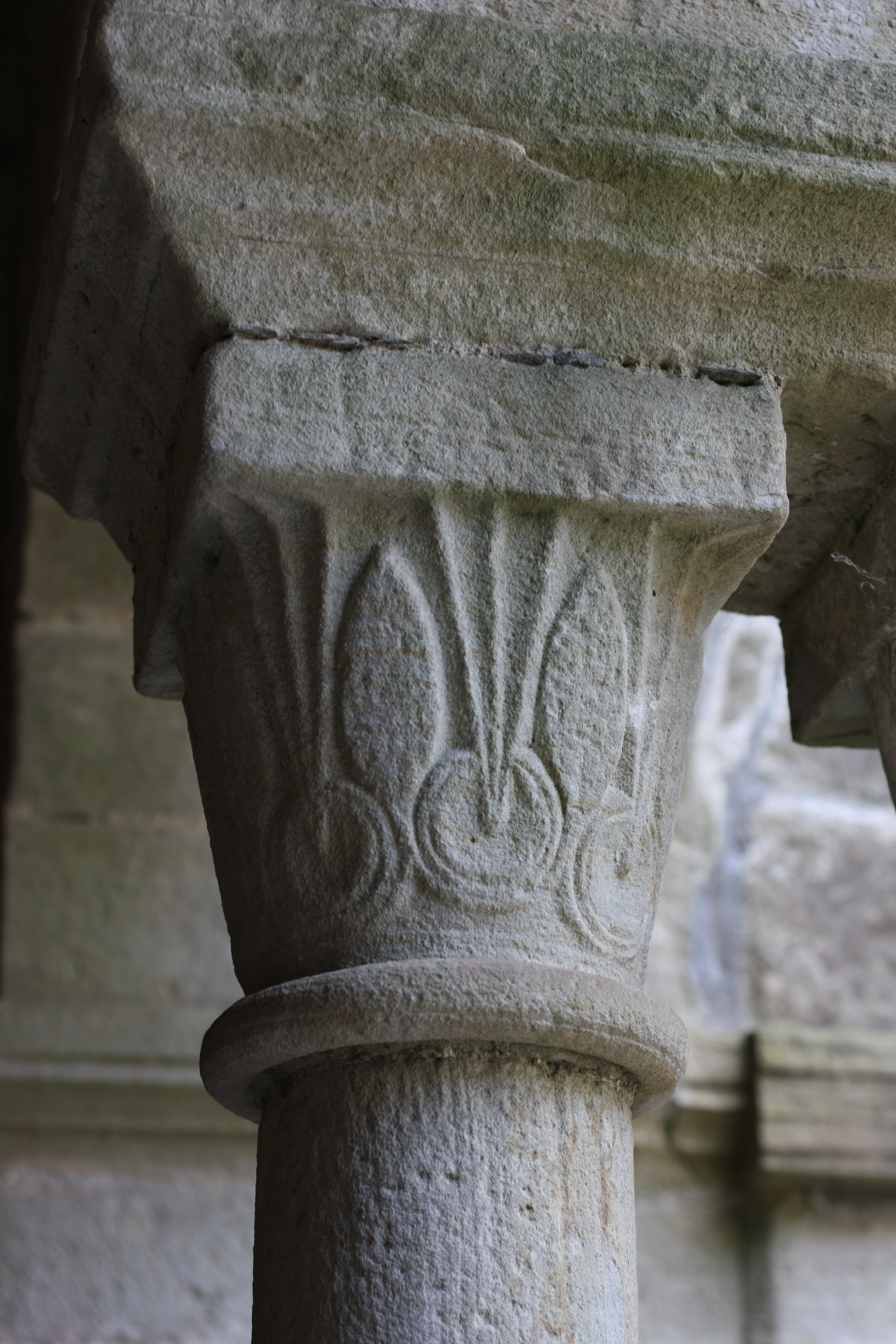
A capital in the monastery.

Established in 1128, it is a listed national monument and is one of the best-preserved of the 160 Grandmontine monasteries. The Priory is now maintained by “Les Amis du Prieure Saint Michel de Grandmont”, a non-profit-making association.

== History ==
The death of Étienne of Thiers, son of Viscount of Thiers prompted the movement of his flock from the forest of Muret (near to Limoges) to the Grandmont plateau, where they built the Abbey of Grandmont. This region then became the hub to more than 160 smaller monasteries, inhabited by more than 1500 hermits, of which, the Priory of St Michel de Grandmont at Lodève was one. By 1772 the Grandmontaine Order had dwindled in popularity, and was eventually dissolved, and the Priory was absorbed into the Diocese of Lodève. Two monks remained in the Priory until their deaths in 1785.

The convent was considered to be one of the strictest and most austere orders of the Middle Ages. There was no hierarchy, archives, or heating. The monks walked with bare feet, in perpetual silence. They ate no meat and fasted regularly, and as they worked, they engaged in silent prayer. The convent was also the first order to be permitted to beg for food.

The building survived the French Revolution without damage and passed into the hands of a local merchant family, who developed it as a home and agricultural estate. From 1849 to 1936 it was owned by the Vitalis family, who were cloth manufacturers. Etienne Vitalis restored the buildings, making them fit for habitation, and wine production. In 1957 it was bought by the Bec family, who owned a local engineering firm. In 1980 the Priory was classed as a historic monument, and opened its doors to the public.

== Architecture ==
The Priory of St Michel de Grandmont is the only surviving building from the order of Grandmont. The group of buildings includes a church, a Romanesque cloister surmounted by a pinnacle, and a chapter house and cellar.
