= Malvern Preparatory School =

Catholic school in Pennsylvania, US

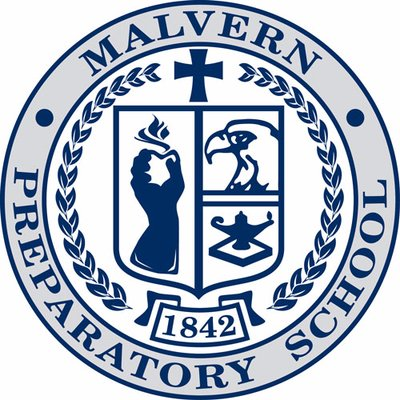

Location
- 418 South Warren Avenue; Malvern, Pennsylvania 19355-2707; United States; 40°1′37″N 75°30′43″W

Information
- School type: Independent Catholic school
- Motto: Latin: Veritas, Unitas, Caritas (Truth, Unity, Love)
- Religious affiliation: Catholic
- Patron saint: Augustine of Hippo
- Established: 1842; 184 years ago
- Founders: Order of Saint Augustine
- Status: Open
- School district: Great Valley School District
- CEEB code: 392365
- NCES School ID: 01186172
- Head of school: Patrick Sillup
- Faculty: 71.5 (on an FTE basis)
- Grades: 6–12
- Gender: All-male
- Enrollment: 631 (2019–2020)
  - Grade 6: 27
  - Grade 7: 41
  - Grade 8: 63
  - Grade 9: 117
  - Grade 10: 129
  - Grade 11: 132
  - Grade 12: 122
- Average class size: 14
- Student to teacher ratio: 8.8
- Hours in school day: 6.7
- Campus size: 103 acres (42 ha)
- Campus type: Suburban
- Colors: Navy & White
- Accreditation: MSA
- SAT average: 1230
- Newspaper: Friar's Lantern
- Yearbook: Malvernian
- Endowment: $23.5 million
- Annual tuition: Upper School - $38,585; Middle School - $32,450
- Revenue: $28.39 million
- Website: www.malvernprep.org

Malvern Preparatory School, commonly known as Malvern Prep, is an independent, all-boys Catholic middle school and college preparatory high school in Malvern, Pennsylvania, within the Archdiocese of Philadelphia. The school is supported by Order of Saint Augustine and is a member of the Augustinian Secondary Education Association.

Malvern Prep is a member of the Inter-Academic League, which also includes Episcopal Academy, Germantown Academy, Penn Charter, The Haverford School, and Springside Chestnut Hill Academy.

== History ==
Malvern Preparatory School is the direct continuation of the academy program founded in 1842 by the Augustinians as the “preparatory” school for what is now Villanova University. The Augustinian community purchased the farm called Belle-Aire in January 1842, to establish a college and monastery under the patronage of St. Thomas of Villanova.

In 1922, due to the expansion of Villanova's college program and the growing distinctions between the academy's attendees and the college's, it was decided to remove the academy from Villanova's campus. The Rosengarten family of Malvern sold a 143 acres (58 ha) part of its old farm between Warren Avenue and Paoli Pike to the Augustinians, and the academy relocated to become Malvern Preparatory School. The property included the site of the Paoli Massacre, a Revolutionary War battlefield that Malvern Prep owned until 2000, when the local municipality, the Borough of Malvern, purchased it for preservation purposes.

Only two original buildings were suitable for classes and are still preserved: the original farmhouse (Austin Hall) and another farm building (the Friary, or Alber's Hall). Because the school needed more space, it built three new buildings in 1924. The first graduating class of Malvern Prep, almost all of whom were boarders, graduated in 1926.

Malvern Prep reached 200 students in 1953 and underwent another construction phase, erecting six new buildings over the next eight years. Over the next twenty years, the number of boarders decreased, eventually to zero; the school is now entirely a day school. The school erected a new indoor sports center (O'Neill Sports Center), a dining hall (Stewart Hall, a then-existing building, Villanova Hall), and several athletic fields in the late 1990s and early 2000s. Malvern Prep has undergone several new constructions in recent years, with a new art center named in honor of the former president, Reverend David J. Duffy, O.S.A. '48, and a new outdoor athletic complex bearing the name of legendary former football coach Gamp Pellegrini.

=== Augustinians in North America ===
The North American Augustinian order was founded in 1796 when Irish friars arrived in Philadelphia. Michael Hurley was the first American to join the order the following year. Friars established schools, a university, and other works throughout the Americas, also including Villanova University in Philadelphia and Merrimack College. While this school was founded in 1842, by 1909, two Augustinian houses and a school had been established in Chicago in 1922 in San Diego, by 1925 a school in Ojai and Los Angeles; 1926 a school in Oklahoma; in 1947 Merrimack College; in 1953 a school in Pennsylvania; 1954 a school in Detroit, Michigan; 1959 a school in New Jersey and in 1962 a school in Illinois.

== Curriculum ==
Malvern offers Advanced Placement courses in Computer Science, Literature and Composition, Spanish, Latin, Calculus (AB and BC), Statistics, Biology, Chemistry, Physics (Mechanics and Electro/Magnetism), Environmental Science, Economics (Micro and Macro), U.S. Government, and U.S. History. Malvern also offers a wide variety of elective/humanities courses such as Music Theory, Entrepreneurship, Elements of Philosophy, Medical Ethics, Music Recording and Technology, and Graphic Design.

Graduates from Malvern typically attend schools such as Villanova University, the University of Notre Dame, Boston College, the University of Pennsylvania, Cornell University, Georgetown University, Pennsylvania State University, Drexel University, and Johns Hopkins University.

== Extracurricular activities ==
=== Athletics ===
Malvern, a member of the Inter-Ac League, participates in eighteen varsity sports: baseball, basketball, rowing crew, cross country, football, golf, ice hockey, indoor track, lacrosse, soccer, squash, swimming & diving, tennis, water polo, wrestling, rugby, and sailing.

Baseball

Malvern Prep’s varsity baseball team, the Friars, competes in the Inter-Academic League and in the Pennsylvania Independent Schools Athletic Association (PAISAA) postseason. The program won 28 Inter-Ac championships between 1980 and 2026, and 12 PAISAA state championships between 2006 and 2026. Alumni of the program who played in Major League Baseball include Ben Davis, Phil Gosselin, and Tim Cooney.

==== Football ====
Malvern Prep football competes in the Inter-Ac League and against other highly regarded regional and national programs. The Friars have won 37 Inter-Ac Championships and have a history of student-athletes who continue to compete at the college level.

==== Basketball ====
Malvern Prep Basketball competes in the Inter-Ac League and maintains a challenging non-league schedule featuring local showcases and high-level tournaments. The program has shared or won Inter-Ac titles in 2020, 2022, and 2023, with alumni continuing to play college basketball.

==== Ice Hockey ====
Malvern Prep Ice Hockey has a long tradition in the Atlantic Prep Athletic Conference and other regional leagues. The program has won 2 APAC Championships, 10 Flyers Cup Championships, and 3 Pennsylvania State Championships. Players have also advanced to collegiate and junior hockey. The Varsity team is currently coached by Bill Keenan.

==== Rugby ====
Malvern started a rugby team in the spring of 2010, playing in the Brandywine district of EPRU. Malvern learned to play the game under head coach Dennis Melesky and Assistant Wayne DiMarco. Soon, the team was hitting the pitch and playing experienced teams. The team finished 6–1 on the season. Malvern's varsity team has ranked among the top 50 in the country.

==== Lacrosse ====
Malvern Prep Lacrosse competes in the Inter-Ac League and has won 15 Inter-Ac Championships and two PA Independent School Championships. The program has also won a Pennsylvania State Championship and regularly earns national top-25 recognition.

In 2006, Malvern Prep's Lacrosse team, coached by John McEvoy, went on to win the Pennsylvania State Lacrosse Championship and boasted three All-Americans. The team is coached by Matt Mackrides.

==== Cross Country ====
Malvern Prep Cross Country is one of Pennsylvania’s top Independent School programs, competing at local, regional, and national levels. Since 2002, the team has won 13 Inter-Ac titles, earned eight state championship podium finishes, produced nine Inter-Ac individual champions, two state champions, 63 All-Inter-Ac selections, and 104 All-Main-Line selections. The team is coached by Mike Koenig, who was inducted into the Malvern Athletics Hall of Fame in 2023.

==== Rowing ====
Malvern Prep Rowing offers Novice and Varsity competition and is a competitive sculling program. The team has earned regional and national titles, including victories at the Scholastic Rowing Association of America Championships and USRowing Youth National Championships. Malvern was also the first scholastic crew to reach the Fawley Challenge Cup final at the Henley Royal Regatta.

Many former Malvern rowers have continued to represent the United States in rowing. Malvern consistently sends rowers to top rowing schools like the University of Washington, Yale University, Dartmouth College, Princeton University, University of California, Berkeley, University of Pennsylvania, Cornell University, and Columbia University.

==== Golf ====
Malvern Prep has JV and Varsity teams that compete in the fall season against other Inter-Ac and public schools. Malvern has won the inter-ac title many times. Malvern practices at Applebrook CC and uses Waynesborough CC for its home matches. Malvern has sent many golfers to Division 1 programs, including Princeton, Penn, Lehigh, UVA, and Villanova. Malvern also holds several course records in the area for high school matches.

==== Water polo ====
Malvern Prep has both an Upper School and a Middle School water polo team. Malvern participates in the Inter-Academic League and is consistently among the top teams. The program was started by Coach Jay Schiller, who currently coaches the Upper School Team. The Middle School team consists of boys from grades 6–8 and competes with Inter-Academic League teams.

== Notable alumni ==
- David Boreanaz (Class of 1987), actor
- Tim Cooney (Class of 2009), former professional baseball player, St. Louis Cardinals
- Jim Croce (post-graduate), former folk and rock singer-songwriter
- Ben Davis (Class of 1995), former professional baseball player, Chicago White Sox, Seattle Mariners, and San Diego Padres
- David DiLucia (Class of 1988), tennis player
- Fran Dunphy (Class of 1967), basketball coach
- Larry Farnese (Class of 1986), Pennsylvania state senator
- Phil Gosselin (Class of 2007), Major League Baseball player
- Michael Gostigian (Class of 1981), pentathlete, three-time Olympian for United States
- Alex Hornibrook (Class of 2015), former college football quarterback
- Bill Kuharich (Class of 1971), National Football League executive
- Wayne Millner (Class of 1931), National Football League player, member of Pro Football Hall of Fame
- Carl Nassib (Class of 2011), National Football League player
- Ryan Nassib (Class of 2008), National Football League player
- Chris Newell (Class of 2019), baseball player in the Los Angeles Dodgers organization
- Paul Pelosi (Class of 1958), Nancy Pelosi's husband
