= Villanova College (Canada) =

Location
- 2480 15th Sideroad; King City, Ontario, L7B 1A4; Canada; 43°56′46″N 79°32′26″W

Information
- School type: High and Middle school
- Motto: Unitas, Veritas, Caritas (Unity, Truth, Love)
- Religious affiliations: Catholic; Order of Saint Augustine, Augustinian Secondary Education Association
- Founded: 1999
- School board: Independent School
- Headmaster: Paul Paradiso
- Grades: 4-12
- Enrollment: ~610 students
- Language: English & French & Spanish
- Colours: Silver and navy blue
- Athletics conference: Conference of Independent Schools of Ontario
- Mascot: Knightro
- Team name: Knights
- Website: www.villanovacollege.org
- Last updated: June 6, 2019

Villanova College is a high school and middle school in King City, Ontario, Canada. Established by lay educators Paul Paradiso and Grant Purdy with the blessing of the Archdiocese Toronto and in cooperation with the Order of Saint Augustine's friars of Toronto and Marylake Augustinian Monastery. The school campus is within the grounds of this Augustinian monastic foundation in King City. Villanova College offers grades four to twelve and is the first, and only, Canadian institution to become a member of the Augustinian Secondary Education Association. It is a privately operated independent school, officially sponsored by the Augustinian Order.

Villanova College is York Region's only independent Catholic school. It offers STEM and AP programs as well as arts, athletic, social outreach and leadership experiences.

== Patron Saint ==
The college is named in honour of St. Thomas of Villanova, a sixteenth-century Spanish Augustinian. Thomas was born in the province of Ciudad Real in 1488, and was raised in Villanueva de los Infantes, a nearby town; hence his name, Thomas of Villanova. In the year 1544, Holy Roman Emperor Charles V appointed Thomas as Archbishop of Valencia. Thomas succeeded in the spiritual renewal of his diocese, and gained the title "Father of the Poor". He gave two-thirds of the income of his diocese to care for the poor in various ways. Each day up to 5 poor people came to his door to be fed and to receive money.

Other English speaking Augustinian Colleges named for this saint are Villanova College, located in Brisbane, Australia, and Villanova Preparatory School in California, United States. He is also the patron saint for Villanova University, a Catholic university located in Villanova, Pennsylvania.

== Notable alumni ==
- Alex Pietrangelo, NHL defenceman for the Las Vegas Golden Knights & former captain of the St. Louis Blues
- Ryan Murphy (ice hockey, born 1993), AHL defenceman for the Henderson Silver Knights

== See also ==
- Education in Ontario
- List of secondary schools in Ontario
