= Alex Pietrangelo =

Canadian ice hockey player (born 1990)

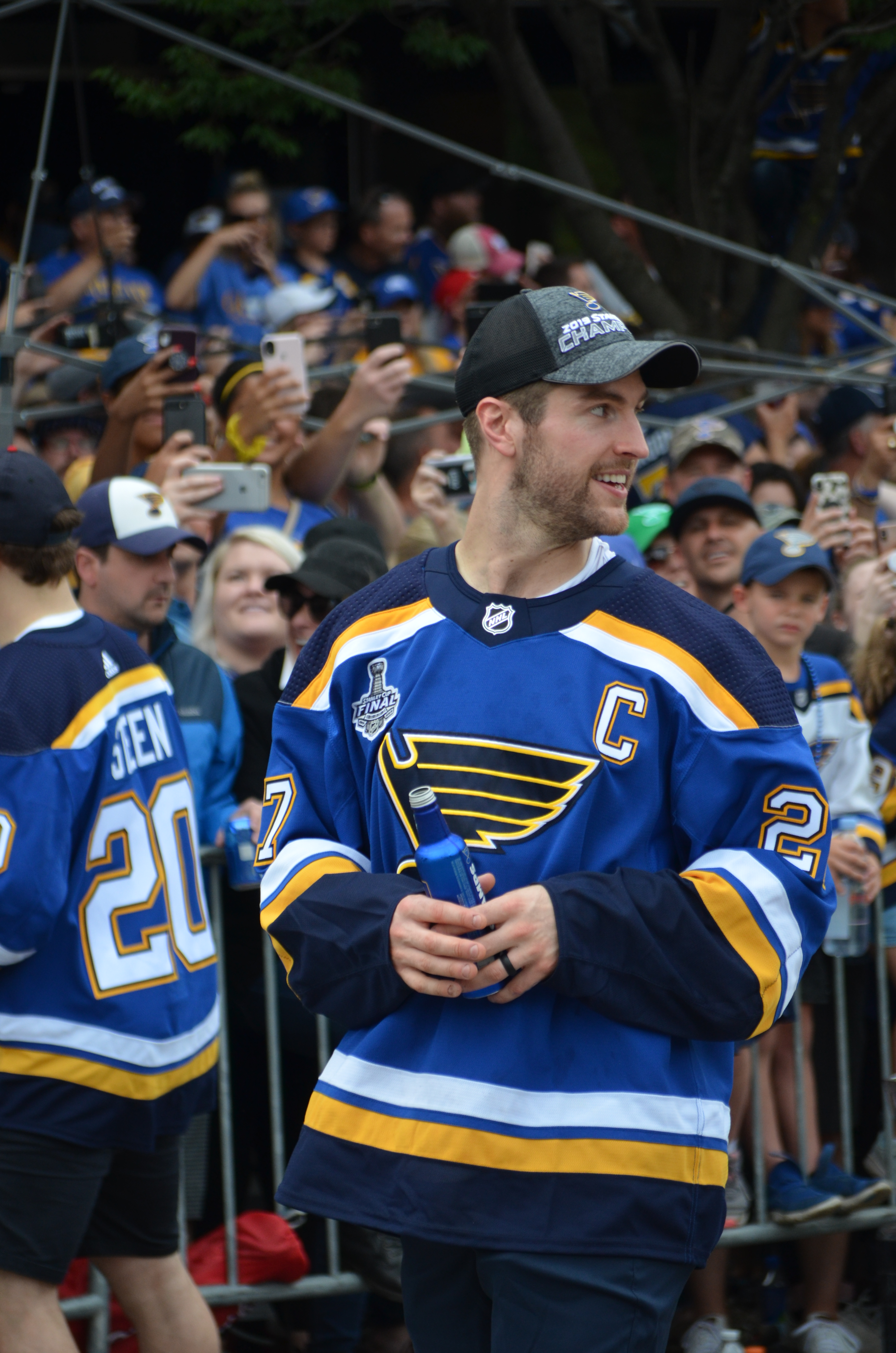
- Pietrangelo with the St. Louis Blues in 2019
- Born: January 18, 1990 (age 36) King City, Ontario, Canada
- Height: 6 ft 3 in (191 cm)
- Weight: 210 lb (95 kg; 15 st 0 lb)
- Position: Defence
- Shoots: Right
- NHL team Former teams: Vegas Golden Knights; St. Louis Blues
- National team: Canada
- NHL draft: 4th overall, 2008; St. Louis Blues
- Playing career: 2008–present

Alexander Pietrangelo (born January 18, 1990) is a Canadian professional ice hockey player who is a defenceman and alternate captain for the Vegas Golden Knights of the National Hockey League (NHL). He previously played for the St. Louis Blues for parts of twelve seasons, captaining the Blues for his final four seasons with the franchise. Nicknamed "Petro", as a junior, he played with the Niagara IceDogs and Barrie Colts of the Ontario Hockey League (OHL). Pietrangelo is a two-time Stanley Cup champion, winning with the Blues in 2019 and the Golden Knights in 2023.

Pietrangelo has competed with Team Canada at the junior and senior level, winning a gold medal win with Canada's under-20 team at the 2009 World Junior Championships. Individually, he was named Best Defenceman at the 2010 World Junior Championship and 2011 Men's World Championship. Pietrangelo was named to the 2014 Canadian Olympic hockey team and won a gold medal at the 2014 Winter Olympics.

== Playing career ==
=== Minor ===
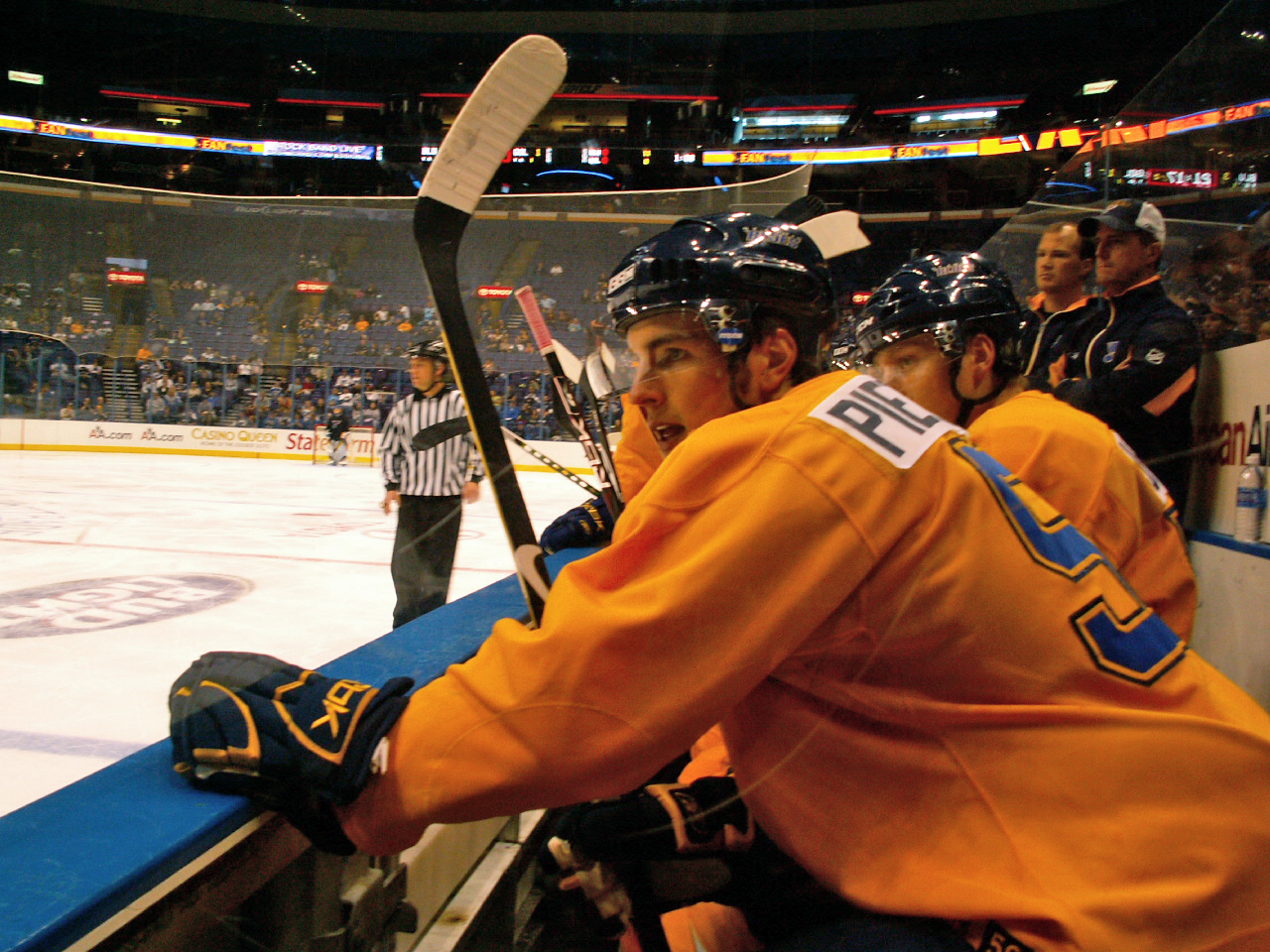
Pietrangelo at the Blues 2008 FanFest, weeks before signing his entry-level contract.

Pietrangelo played minor hockey in the Greater Toronto Area when he was growing up. He started to play hockey for the NobleKing Knights, Rep A team and then with the Richmond Hill Stars of the OMHA before playing three years with the Vaughan Kings of the Greater Toronto Hockey League (GTHL). As a novice aged player (nine and under), Pietrangelo and his Toronto Pro Hockey Development teammates participated in the 2000 Brick Super Novice Tournament in Edmonton, Alberta. His teammates included Steven Stamkos, John Tavares, Philip McRae and Michael Del Zotto. Toronto, however, was defeated in the tournament final by the Vancouver Pacific Vipers, on a goal by Jordan Eberle. Pietrangelo was also a member of the All-Ontario Peewee AAA Champion Vaughan Kings team in 2003. He played three years in the Toronto Jr. Canadiens AAA system. The Jr. Canadiens won Ontario's bantam championship in 2005, with Pietrangelo scoring the game-winning goal in the final against the Markham Waxers.

=== Junior ===
After his successful minor hockey career, Pietrangelo was drafted third overall by the Ontario Hockey League (OHL)'s Mississauga IceDogs in the first round of the 2006 OHL Priority Selection. He scored at a near point-per-game pace in his rookie season with the IceDogs with 52 points in 59 games, then moved with the team to Niagara as the franchise relocated in 2007.

In September 2007, he was named Canadian Hockey League Player of the Week after recording three goals and four assists in two games. In December 2007, TSN ranked Pietrangelo third overall among eligible skaters for the 2008 NHL entry draft. International Scouting Services described Pietrangelo as a "tremendous specimen in terms of size and skills" and ranked him fifth among North American draft prospects at mid-season, then sixth in their final rankings leading up to the draft. Pietrangelo finishing his second OHL season with 53 points in 60 games.

After the Blues lent him to the Canadian under-20 team for the 2010 World Junior Championships, Pietrangelo was returned to the OHL. During the World Juniors, his OHL rights were traded from the IceDogs to the Barrie Colts. Playing half a season with Barrie, he recorded 29 points in 25 games, while adding 14 points in 17 playoff games. Due to his long playoff run with the Colts, he did not have the opportunity to play in the AHL as he did the previous season.

=== Professional ===
==== St. Louis Blues ====
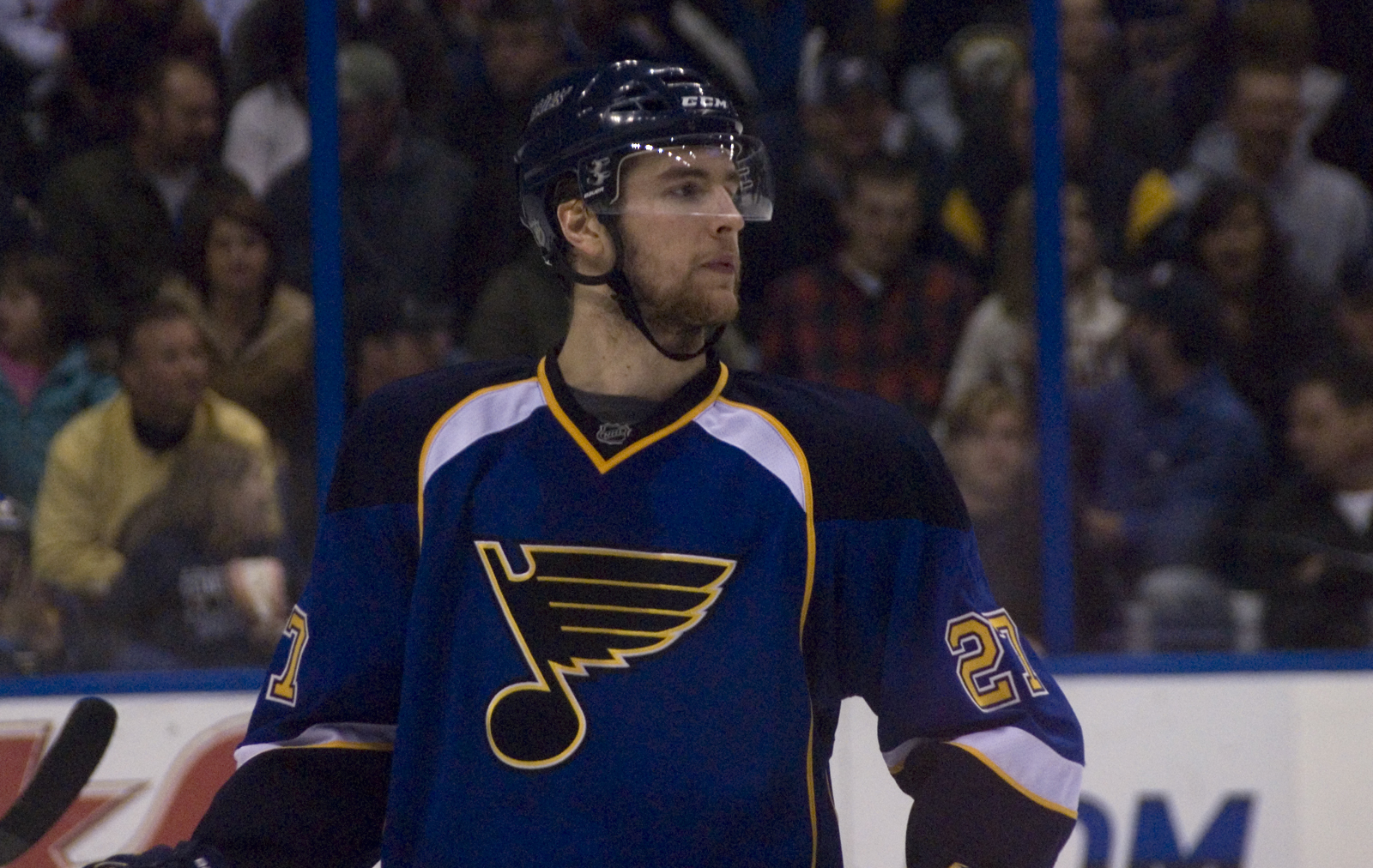
Pietrangelo during the 2010–11 season, his first full season with the Blues.

Pietrangelo was selected fourth overall by the St. Louis Blues at the 2008 NHL entry draft on June 20, 2008. Coming into training camp, the Blues signed him to an entry-level contract on September 4, 2008. Pietrangelo earned his way onto the team for opening night and played his first NHL game against the Nashville Predators on October 10, 2008. Three days later, however, he suffered a head injury on October 13 in a game against the Toronto Maple Leafs, when Ryan Hollweg checked him from behind into the boards. Pietrangelo returned shortly, and after playing eight games total for the Blues, he was sent back to his junior team, the Niagara Icedogs. On April 10, 2009, he was assigned to the Blues' top minor league affiliate, the Peoria Rivermen of the American Hockey League (AHL), after his junior season had ended.

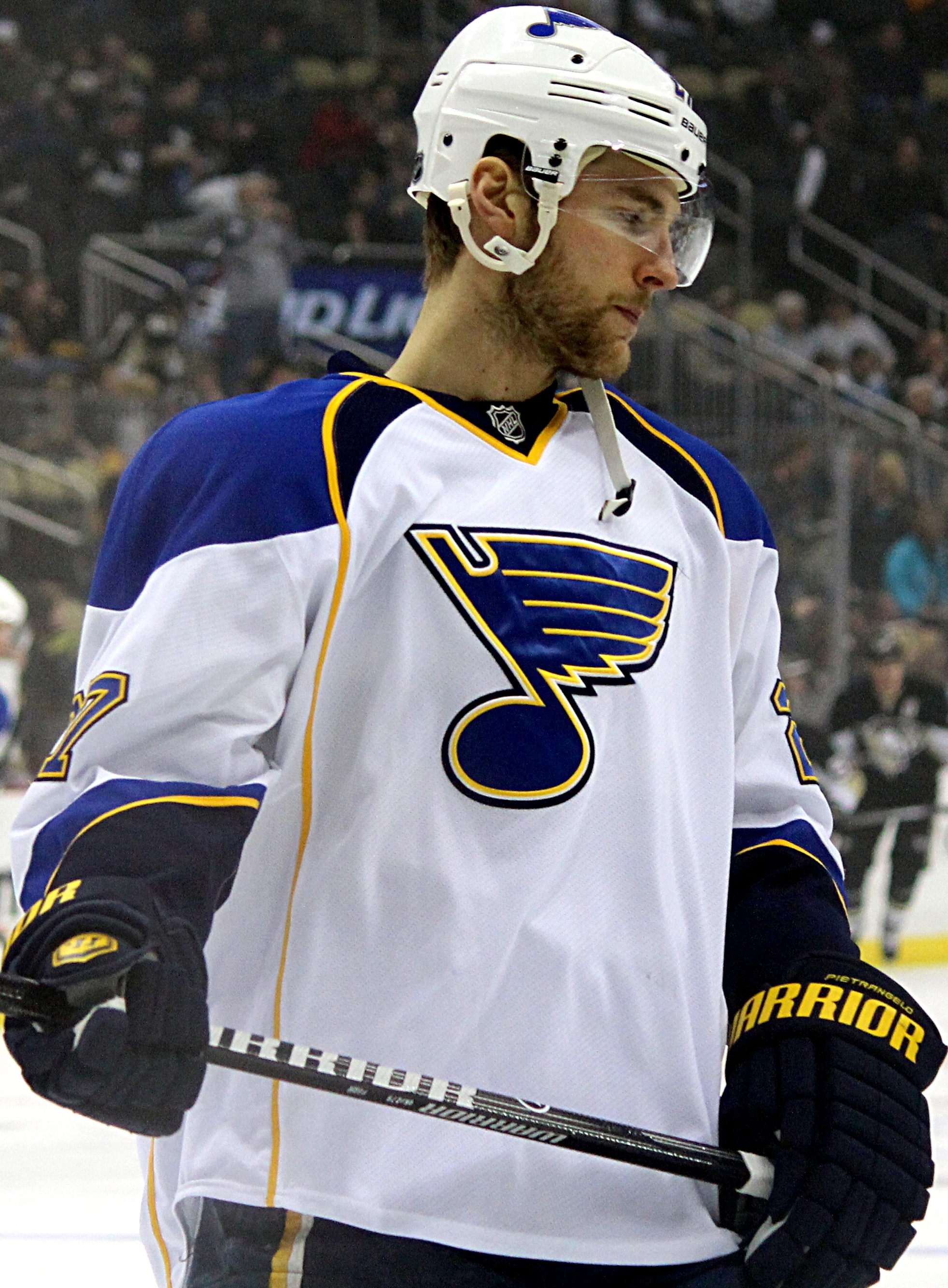
Pietrangelo with the Blues during the 2013–14 season.

Pietrangelo began the 2009–10 season on the Blues' roster for a second consecutive year, but played in only nine games by December 2009. In 2010–11, Pietrangelo played his first full season with the Blues, leading all team defencemen with 43 points (11 goals and 32 assists) over 79 games. He also led team defencemen in plus-minus (+18) and shots (161), while ranking third in average ice time per game. Due to his previous eight- and nine-game seasons in the NHL, he did not qualify as a rookie. Comparatively, the league's leading scorer among rookie defencemen that season was teammate Kevin Shattenkirk, who was born a year earlier than Pietrangelo; he also recorded 43 points. At the end of the 2011–12 season, Pietrangelo was named to the NHL Second All-Star Team. On September 13, 2013, Pietrangelo agreed to a seven-year, $45 million contract with the Blues. Pietrangelo was again named to the NHL Second All-Star Team during the 2013–14 season.

On August 24, 2016, Pietrangelo was named captain of the Blues. In his second year as captain, he was injured in a game against the Detroit Red Wings on December 9 and was placed on injured reserve until December 19. Despite his setback from injury, Pietrangelo was selected for his first NHL All-Star Game where he won the All-Star passing challenge. Pietrangelo also set a new career-high in points and goals at the conclusion of the regular season. On June 12, 2019, Pietrangelo and the Blues defeated the Boston Bruins to win their first Stanley Cup in franchise history. Pietrangelo scored the Stanley Cup-winning goal in game seven after being set up by Jaden Schwartz. During the 2019 playoffs, Pietrangelo tied with Bruins defenceman Torey Krug for leading the league in assists and lead the league in scoring amongst defenceman.

On December 29, 2019, Pietrangelo got his 326th assist, topping Al MacInnis as the most by a Blues defenceman. Pietrangelo was selected to play in his second NHL All-Star Game, along with Blues teammates Ryan O'Reilly, David Perron and Jordan Binnington.

==== Vegas Golden Knights ====
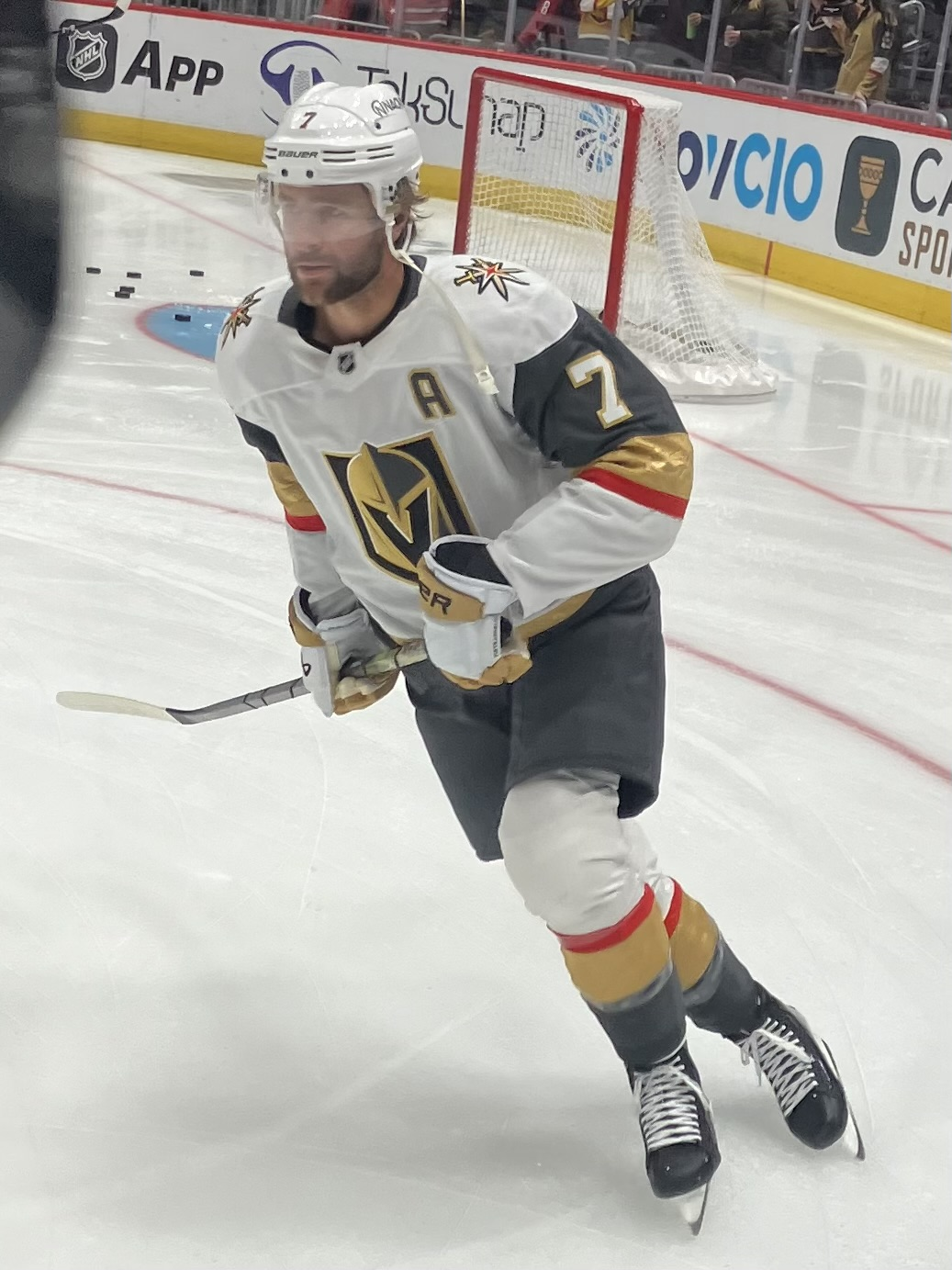
Pietrangelo with the Golden Knights in 2024.

In the final year of his contract with free agency impending, Pietrangelo and the Blues were unable to come to terms on a contract extension, and the two parties ultimately broke off negotiations, making Pietrangelo a free agent for the first time in his career; the main point of contention was that Pietrangelo was looking for a full no movement clause (which was personally important for Pietrangelo as he has four children all under the age of 3 years old at the time of his free agency and wanted guaranteed stability of not having to move teams via trade or waivers), which Blues general manager Doug Armstrong refused to give (Armstrong has a consistent history of never handing out full no move clauses to any of his players). On October 12, 2020, Pietrangelo signed a seven-year, $61.6 million contract with the Vegas Golden Knights that included a full no move clause for the entirety of the contract.

In 2022, Pietrangelo was named to his third NHL All-Star Game. With help from actor Jon Hamm, Pietrangelo won the Breakaway Challenge portion of the All-Star Skills Competition despite missing both of his shots.

Pietrangelo took time away from the team midway through the 2022–23 season after his daughter was suffering from a brain lesion, and briefly contemplated retirement. However, as her condition improved, he was able to return to play, having missed nine games. Pietrangelo attracted controversy at multiple points during the team's deep run in the 2023 Stanley Cup playoffs, the first coming after he was suspended for one game during the Golden Knights' second-round series against the Edmonton Oilers after slashing the arm of Oilers forward Leon Draisaitl. He would in turn accuse the Oilers players of "premeditated" hits on him that were ignored by the officials. Vegas would ultimately reach the 2023 Stanley Cup Final against the Florida Panthers. Pietrangelo exited the penalty box following the end of game four and became enmeshed in an ongoing brawl, which attracted some speculation as to whether the rules required him to be suspended for 10 games. However, ultimately none was applied. The Golden Knights ultimately defeated the Panthers in five games, and Pietrangelo hoisted the Stanley Cup for the second time in his career.

On June 30, 2025, one day before free agency, Pietrangelo announced he would be stepping away from playing to focus on his health, owing to injuries sustained during the 2024–25 season and beforehand; most notably, Pietrangelo will require a bilateral femur reconstruction surgery.

== International play ==
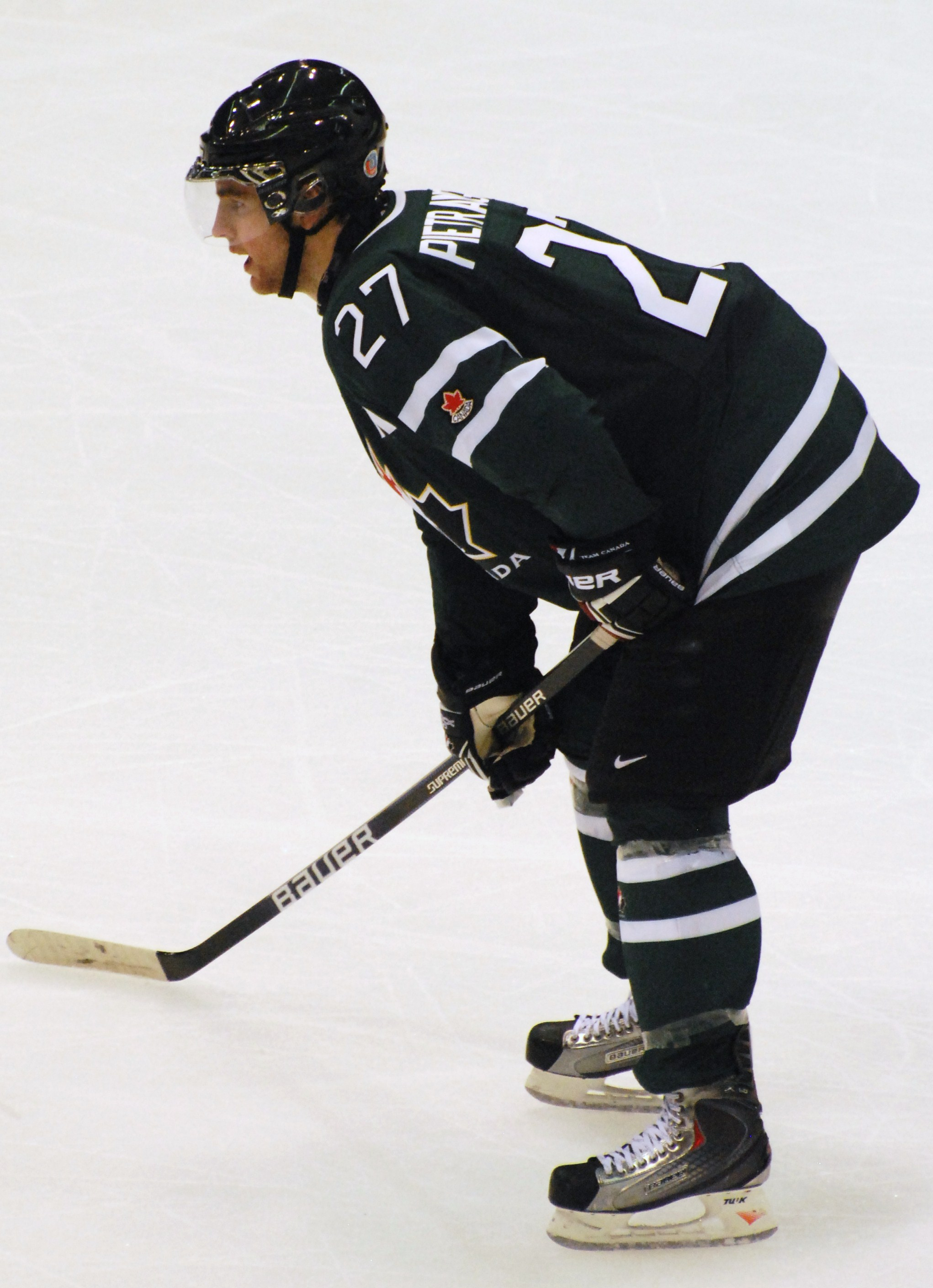
- Pietrangelo at the 2010 World Junior Championships

Medal record

Men's ice hockey

Representing Canada

Winter Olympics
Gold medal – first place	2014 Sochi	

Canada Cup / World Cup
Gold medal – first place	2016 Toronto	

World Junior Championships
Gold medal – first place	2009 Canada	
Silver medal – second place	2010 Canada	

Pietrangelo was picked to play for Hockey Canada's under-18 team at the 2007 Ivan Hlinka Memorial Tournament, where he served as an alternate captain. The team finished fourth. He played next for the Canada junior team at the 2009 World Junior Championships and won a gold medal.

The following year, Pietrangelo was loaned by his NHL team, the St. Louis Blues, to play for Canada in 2010 World Junior Championships. He was selected as an alternate captain to Patrice Cormier. In the final game of the round-robin, Pietrangelo scored a shorthanded game-tying goal against the United States junior team to send the game to overtime. Canada eventually won in a shootout and earned a bye into the semifinals. Advancing to the gold medal game, Canada met the United States in a rematch, but lost 6–5 in overtime. Pietrangelo picked up several individual honours at the conclusion of the tournament. He was named a Tournament All-Star by the media, the Best Defenceman by the directorate and was selected by the coaching staff as one of Canada's top three players.

As the St. Louis Blues failed to make the playoffs in Pietrangelo's first full season in the NHL, he was selected to Canada senior team for the 2011 World Championship. With two goals and three assists for five points over seven games, he led Canada in defensive scoring, while tying for second overall among all tournament defencemen. Canada advanced to the quarterfinals as the top-ranked team in their pool, but lost 2–1 to Russia senior team. At the end of the tournament, Pietrangelo was chosen as the Best Defenceman by the directorate. He was part of Canada's gold medal-winning 2014 Winter Olympics team. He played in all six of Canada's games, contributing one assist.

On October 3, 2021, Pietrangelo was one of the first three players named to the men's roster for Canada's team for the 2022 Winter Olympics, alongside Sidney Crosby and Connor McDavid. However, due to the NHL's subsequent decision not to attend the Winter Olympics as a result of the COVID-19's impacts on scheduling, Pietrangelo was unable to compete.

== Personal life ==
Pietrangelo was born to parents Joe and Edy, and raised along with his older brother David in King City. He graduated from Holy Name Catholic Elementary School, King City ON and Villanova Collage, King City ON. His father is the cousin of former NHL goaltender Frank Pietrangelo. He attended high school at Villanova College.

Pietrangelo married St. Louis native Jayne in July 2016. In 2017, he and his wife experienced pregnancy loss. They had triplets in July 2018. The couple had their fourth child in September 2020. In September 2022, one of their children developed encephalitis; the ordeal caused Pietrangelo to miss nine games in the 2022–23 season and briefly contemplate retirement, though she made a recovery by the end of the year.

As a child, Pietrangelo's friend died of cancer. As an adult, his niece was diagnosed with Wilms' tumor, but survived. This led him to partner with Friends of Kids with Cancer to raise funds and awareness for youth living with cancer.

== Career statistics ==
=== Regular season and playoffs ===
Bold indicates led league

			Regular season					Playoffs
Season	Team	League	GP	G	A	Pts	PIM	GP	G	A	Pts	PIM
2005–06	Toronto Jr. Canadiens AAA	GTHL U16	44	13	31	44	33	—	—	—	—	—
2006–07	Mississauga IceDogs	OHL	59	7	45	52	45	4	0	0	0	8
2007–08	Niagara IceDogs	OHL	60	13	40	53	94	6	5	4	9	4
2008–09	Niagara IceDogs	OHL	36	8	21	29	32	—	—	—	—	—
2008–09	St. Louis Blues	NHL	8	0	1	1	2	—	—	—	—	—
2008–09	Peoria Rivermen	AHL	1	0	0	0	4	7	0	3	3	2
2009–10	St. Louis Blues	NHL	9	1	1	2	6	—	—	—	—	—
2009–10	Barrie Colts	OHL	25	9	20	29	27	17	2	12	14	8
2010–11	St. Louis Blues	NHL	79	11	32	43	19	—	—	—	—	—
2011–12	St. Louis Blues	NHL	81	12	39	51	36	8	0	5	5	0
2012–13	St. Louis Blues	NHL	47	5	19	24	10	6	1	1	2	2
2013–14	St. Louis Blues	NHL	81	8	43	51	32	6	1	2	3	0
2014–15	St. Louis Blues	NHL	81	7	39	46	28	6	0	2	2	0
2015–16	St. Louis Blues	NHL	73	7	30	37	20	20	2	8	10	16
2016–17	St. Louis Blues	NHL	80	14	34	48	24	11	0	4	4	8
2017–18	St. Louis Blues	NHL	78	15	39	54	22	—	—	—	—	—
2018–19	St. Louis Blues	NHL	71	13	28	41	22	26	3	**16**	19	12
2019–20	St. Louis Blues	NHL	70	16	36	52	20	9	1	5	6	6
2020–21	Vegas Golden Knights	NHL	41	7	16	23	16	19	4	8	12	18
2021–22	Vegas Golden Knights	NHL	80	13	31	44	42	—	—	—	—	—
2022–23	Vegas Golden Knights	NHL	73	11	43	54	16	21	1	9	10	29
2023–24	Vegas Golden Knights	NHL	64	4	29	33	24	7	0	1	1	4
2024–25	Vegas Golden Knights	NHL	71	4	29	33	16	10	2	4	6	0
NHL totals			1,087	148	489	637	355	149	15	65	80	95

=== International ===
Year	Team	Event	Result	GP	G	A	Pts	PIM
2007	Canada	IH18	4th	4	1	1	2	2
2009	Canada	WJC	1st place, gold medalist(s)	6	1	2	3	0
2010	Canada	WJC	2nd place, silver medalist(s)	6	3	9	12	14
2011	Canada	WC	5th	7	2	3	5	2
2014	Canada	OG	1st place, gold medalist(s)	6	0	1	1	0
2016	Canada	WCH	1st place, gold medalist(s)	6	1	2	3	2
Junior totals				16	5	12	17	16
Senior totals				19	3	6	9	4

== Awards and achievements ==
Award	Year	Ref
NHL
Second All-Star Team	2012, 2014, 2020	
NHL All-Star Game	2018, 2020, 2022	
Stanley Cup champion	2019, 2023	
International
World Championship Best Defenceman	2011	

Awards and achievements
Preceded by David Perron	St. Louis Blues first-round draft pick 2008	Succeeded by David Rundblad
Preceded by Erik Karlsson	World Junior Best Defenceman; 2010	Succeeded by Ryan Ellis
Sporting positions
Preceded by David Backes	St. Louis Blues captain 2016–2020	Succeeded by Ryan O'Reilly
