= Bob Zimny =

American football player (1921–2011)

No. 63, 15
- Position: Tackle

Personal information
- Born: December 11, 1921; Chicago, Illinois, U.S.
- Died: August 11, 2011 (aged 89); Shelbyville, Indiana, U.S.
- Listed height: 6 ft 1 in (1.85 m)
- Listed weight: 233 lb (106 kg)

Career information
- High school: St. Rita of Cascia (Chicago)
- College: Indiana (1940–1942)
- NFL draft: 1944: 28th round, 287th overall pick

Career history
- Chicago Cardinals (1945–1949)

Awards and highlights
- NFL champion (1947)

Career NFL statistics
- Games played: 52
- Games started: 23
- Fumble recoveries: 2
- Stats at Pro Football Reference

Robert John Zimny (December 11, 1921 – August 11, 2011) was an American professional football tackle who played two seasons with the Chicago Cardinals of the National Football League (NFL). He was selected by the Brooklyn Tigers in the 28th round of the 1944 NFL draft after playing college football at Indiana University Bloomington. He was a member of the Cardinals team that won the 1947 NFL Championship.

== Early life and college ==
Robert John Zimny was born on December 11, 1921, in Chicago, Illinois. He attended St. Rita of Cascia High School in Chicago.

He was a member of the Indiana Hoosiers from 1940 to 1942 and a two-year letterman from 1941 to 1942. His football career was interrupted by a stint in the United States Army during World War II. He played football while in the Army.

== Professional career ==
Zimny was selected by the Brooklyn Tigers in the 28th round, with the 287th overall pick, of the 1944 NFL draft. He later signed with the Chicago Cardinals in 1945. He played in all ten games, starting three, for the Cardinals during the 1945 season, recording one kick return for 12 yards, one fumble, and two fumble recoveries. He appeared in all 11 games, starting six, in 1946. He played in seven games in 1947. On December 28, 1947, the Cardinals beat the Philadelphia Eagles in the 1947 NFL Championship Game by a score of 28–21. Zimny appeared in all 12 games, starting ten, for the team during the 1948 season. The Cardinals finished the year with an 11–1 record. Zimny started for the Cardinals in the 1948 NFL Championship Game, where they faced the Eagles for the second straight season but this time, lost by a score of 7–0. Zimny played in all 12 games for the second consecutive season, starting four, for the Cardinals in 1949. He was released the next year on September 11, 1950.

== Personal life ==
Zimny graduated from Indiana University Bloomington with a teaching degree in 1951. He started his teaching career in 1958 at Shelbyville High School in Shelbyville, Indiana, where he taught physical education, health and drivers education classes. He also coached football and track at Shelbyville High, retiring from the school in 1983. Zimny died on August 11, 2011, in Shelbyville.
