= D2x =

American rapper (born 1997)

- D2x in 2021

Background information
- Born: Demauris Dixon; October 29, 1997 (age 28); Chicago, Illinois
- Education: Western Illinois University
- Genres: Alternative hip hop; boom bap; jazz rap
- Years active: 2017–present

Demauris Dixon (born October 29, 1997), also known as D2x, is an American rapper. Formerly a Division 1 basketball prospect, he switched to rapping while in college. He has since released three studio albums. Much of his music is inspired by early-2010s alternative hip hop.

== Early life ==
Demauris Dixon was born on October 29, 1997, in Chicago, Illinois. He attended St. Rita of Cascia High School and was nominated to play in the McDonald's All-American Game, being a Division 1 prospect. He then went to Western Illinois University and continued to pursue a career as a professional basketball player. He eventually found that he could not commit to basketball and switched to music instead, taking inspiration from the rapper DMX for his name. After graduating amidst the COVID-19 pandemic, he began to make music at home; previously, he had been taking commutes to the city to use a studio there.

== Career ==
D2x had been making music since 2017; he released his first extended play, Enjoy Life, on August 10, 2018, and his first studio album, The Color Blue, on March 26, 2021. His second album, Hotel 1105, was released on August 23, 2023. The Hunger Era, his third studio album, was released on October 29, 2024.

== Influences and artistry ==
The Chicago Reader, reporting on D2x's debut album The Color Blue, noted that his album contained "densely packed rhymes, live instrumentation, and frequent references to D2x’s Christianity." The magazine compared him to Kanye West on his album The College Dropout, J. Cole, Mac Miller, Wale, and The Cool Kids. D2x has also stated that he is influenced by Earl Sweatshirt, Miles Davis, and J Dilla.

== Discography ==
=== Studio albums ===
Title	Details
The Color Blue	Released: March 26, 2021; Label: Self-released; Formats: Digital download, LP
Hotel 1105	Released: August 23, 2023; Label: Self-released; Formats: Digital download, LP
The Hunger Era	Released: October 29, 2024; Label: Fake Shore Drive / Next Records; Formats: Digital download, LP

=== Extended plays ===
Title	Details
Enjoy Life	Released: August 10, 2018; Label: Self-released; Formats: Digital download
Boy in the Blue Hoodie	Released: June 3, 2025; Label: Self-released; Formats: Digital download

=== Singles ===
Title	Year	Album
"Surviving in Amerikkka"	2017	Non-album single
"Nites"	2018	Enjoy Life
"Woop Woop" (with Glohan Beats)	2019	Non-album single
"Go!"	2019	Non-album single
"Day Job"	2021	The Color Blue
"Understand"	2022	Non-album single
"Faith"	2023	Hotel 1105
"Fire"	2024	The Hunger Era
"Wow!" (with Chris Patrick)	2024	The Hunger Era
