= Tim Cooney (baseball) =

American baseball player (born 1990)

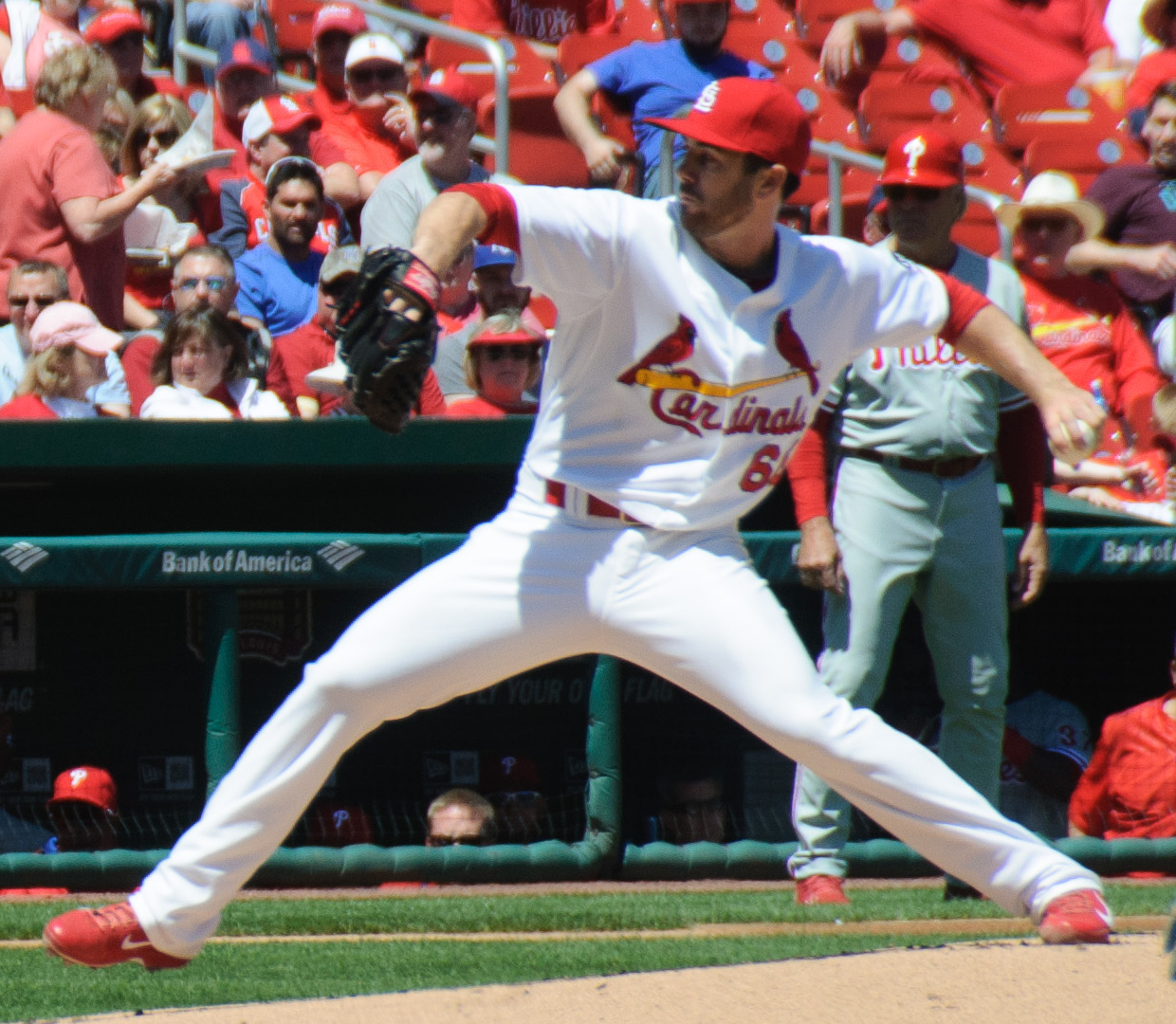
- Cooney with the St. Louis Cardinals in 2015
- Pitcher
- Born: December 19, 1990 (age 35); Collegeville, Pennsylvania, U.S.
- Batted: Left Threw: Left

MLB debut
- April 30, 2015, for the St. Louis Cardinals

Last MLB appearance
- July 24, 2015, for the St. Louis Cardinals

MLB statistics
- Win–loss record: 1–0
- Earned run average: 3.16
- Strikeouts: 29
- Stats at Baseball Reference

Teams
- St. Louis Cardinals (2015)

Timothy Manus Cooney (born December 19, 1990) is an American former professional baseball pitcher. He played in Major League Baseball (MLB) for the St. Louis Cardinals. The Cardinals selected him in the third round of the 2012 amateur draft after attending Wake Forest University and playing college baseball for the Demon Deacons. He made his major league debut on April 30, 2015.

== Career ==
=== Amateur ===
Cooney attended Malvern Preparatory School in Malvern, Pennsylvania. Pitching for Malvern's baseball team, Cooney won the Pennsylvania state championship in 2009. Though Cooney received scholarship offers from Ivy League universities, he chose to enroll at Wake Forest University to play college baseball for the Demon Deacons in the Atlantic Coast Conference (ACC). As a sophomore, Cooney was named to the All-ACC second team. After the 2011 season, he played collegiate summer baseball with the Chatham Anglers of the Cape Cod Baseball League.

=== St. Louis Cardinals ===
The Cardinals chose Cooney in the third round, with the 117th overall selection, of the 2012 MLB draft. He made his professional debut that year with the Batavia Muckdogs of the Class A-Short Season New York–Penn League. In 2013, Cooney began the season with the Palm Beach Cardinals of the Class A-Advanced Florida State League, and was promoted to the Springfield Cardinals of the Class AA Texas League. The Cardinals invited Cooney to spring training in 2014. With Springfield, he was a mid-season All-Star for the Texas League. Next, Cooney pitched for the Memphis Redbirds of the Class AAA Pacific Coast League (PCL) in 2014, and opened the season with Memphis in 2015. Entering the 2015 season, Baseball America rated Cooney as having the best control in the Cardinals organization.

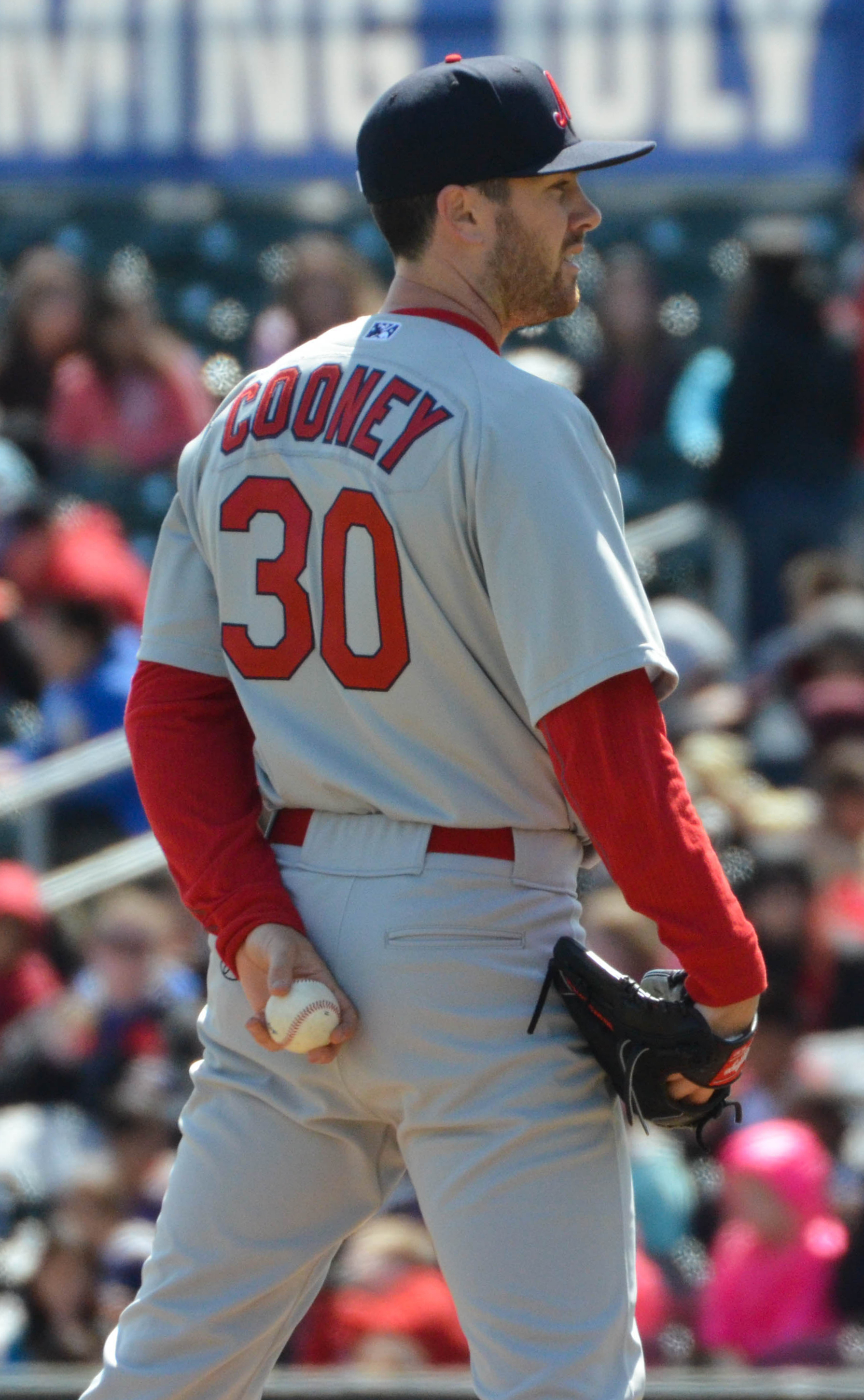
Cooney during his tenure with the Memphis Redbirds, triple-A affiliates of the Cardinals, in 2015

Cooney made his major league debut on April 30, 2015, replacing the injured Adam Wainwright in the Cardinals' starting rotation. Cooney struggled in his debut, and was optioned back to Memphis the next day. On May 17, he was named the PCL Pitcher of the Week after allowing a 0.66 ERA in 13 1/3 IP against the New Orleans Zephyrs and Omaha Storm Chasers. He also held batters to a .143 batting average against (7-for-49). In his first 14 starts of the season with Memphis, Cooney completed 88 2/3 IP, allowing 27 ER for a 2.74 ERA. He also struck out 63 batters and was 6–4 in won–loss decisions. He was named to the 2015 PCL All-Star squad on July 1. The Cardinals recalled him the next day when they placed outfielder Jon Jay on the disabled list.

On July 24 against the Atlanta Braves, Cooney earned his first major league victory by pitching a career-high seven innings in a 4−2 outcome. He had previously received no-decisions in each of his first five major league starts. Further, he had a 12-inning scoreless streak that ended in the sixth inning. The Cardinals withheld Cooney from play for the remainder of the season starting on September 1 due to appendicitis. His major league totals for the season included a 1–0 record, 3.16 ERA, 28 hits, 10 walks allowed and 29 strikeouts in 31 1/3 innings.

Prior to the 2016 season, Baseball America rated Cooney as the second-best prospect in the Cardinals organization. However, Cooney missed the whole 2016 season due to a shoulder injury.

=== Cleveland Indians ===
On November 18, 2016, Cooney was claimed off waivers by the Cleveland Indians. The Indians released Cooney on April 2, 2017. Cooney signed a minor league deal with the Indians on April 6, 2017. He pitched only four games in 2017, with the AZL Indians where he posted a 6.00 ERA, due to injury. He elected free agency following the season on November 6.

== Personal life ==
After his baseball career ended, Cooney attended the Wharton School.

== Awards ==
- Atlantic Coast Conference All-ACC second team (2011)
- Baseball America Pacific Coast League Best Control (2015)
- Baseball America St. Louis Cardinals' organization Best Control (2015)
- 2× Minor League Baseball All-Star
  - Pacific Coast League (2015)
  - Texas League mid-season (2013)
- 2× Pacific Coast League Pitcher of the Week (June 1, 2014; May 17, 2015)

== See also ==
- St. Louis Cardinals all-time roster
