= Israel Del Toro =

Retired Air Force senior master sergeant (born 1975)

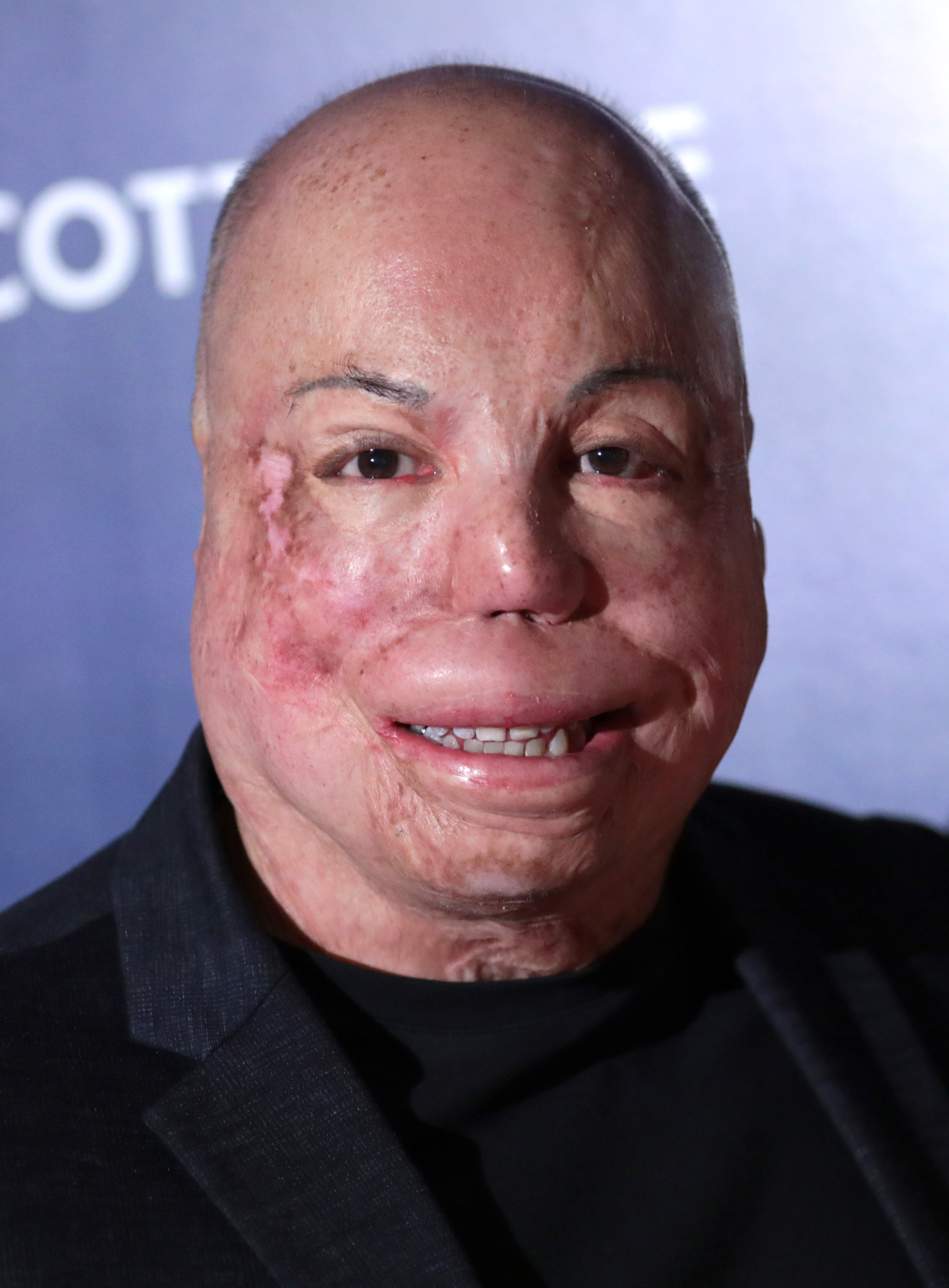
- Del Toro in 2023
- Born: April 27, 1975 (age 51); Joliet, Illinois, U.S.
- Military career
- Allegiance: United States
- Branch: United States Air Force
- Service years: 1997–2019
- Rank: Senior master sergeant
- Nickname: DT
- Conflicts: Iraq War; War in Afghanistan
- Awards: Bronze Star Medal; Purple Heart
- Other work: Motivational speaker
- Website: deltorostrong.com

Israel Del Toro (born April 27, 1975) is an American motivational speaker and a retired senior master sergeant in the United States Air Force. After a Humvee in which he was travelling drove over an improvised explosive device, he suffered burns to 80 percent of his body, was badly disfigured, and fell into a coma for three months. Although his odds of survival were placed at 15 percent, he eventually recovered, and became the first airman to reenlist after being deemed 100 percent disabled. After his retirement from the Air Force, Del Toro became a motivational speaker.

== Early life ==
Israel "DT" Del Toro was born in Joliet, Illinois, on April 27, 1975. Del Toro lost both of his parents at a young age. When he was twelve, his father died of a heart attack, and at fourteen, his mother died in a collision with a drunk driver. Following the death of his parents, he began to raise his three younger siblings alongside his grandparents. In 1993, he graduated from Providence Catholic High School in New Lenox, Illinois. Dissatisfied with a job at an ammonia plant, he decided to join the Air Force in 1997.

== Military career and injury ==
Del Toro joined the Air Force as a Tactical Air Control Party (TACP) apprentice; his main responsibility was to call for air support. He saw action in Bosnia in March 2001 and in the Iraq War, earning a Bronze Star Medal for his service. In August 2005, Del Toro deployed to Afghanistan as part of Operation Enduring Freedom.

On December 4, 2005, while on a mission to neutralize a high-value target, Del Toro's Humvee struck an improvised explosive device. He later recounted feeling a "intense heat blast" and being "on fire from head to toe." After he collapsed, a member of the team carried him to a nearby creek; others kept him awake until medical evacuation could arrive. While receiving medical attention, Del Toro successfully instructed a soldier to call for an airstrike in his stead. He was evacuated by helicopter to a field hospital.

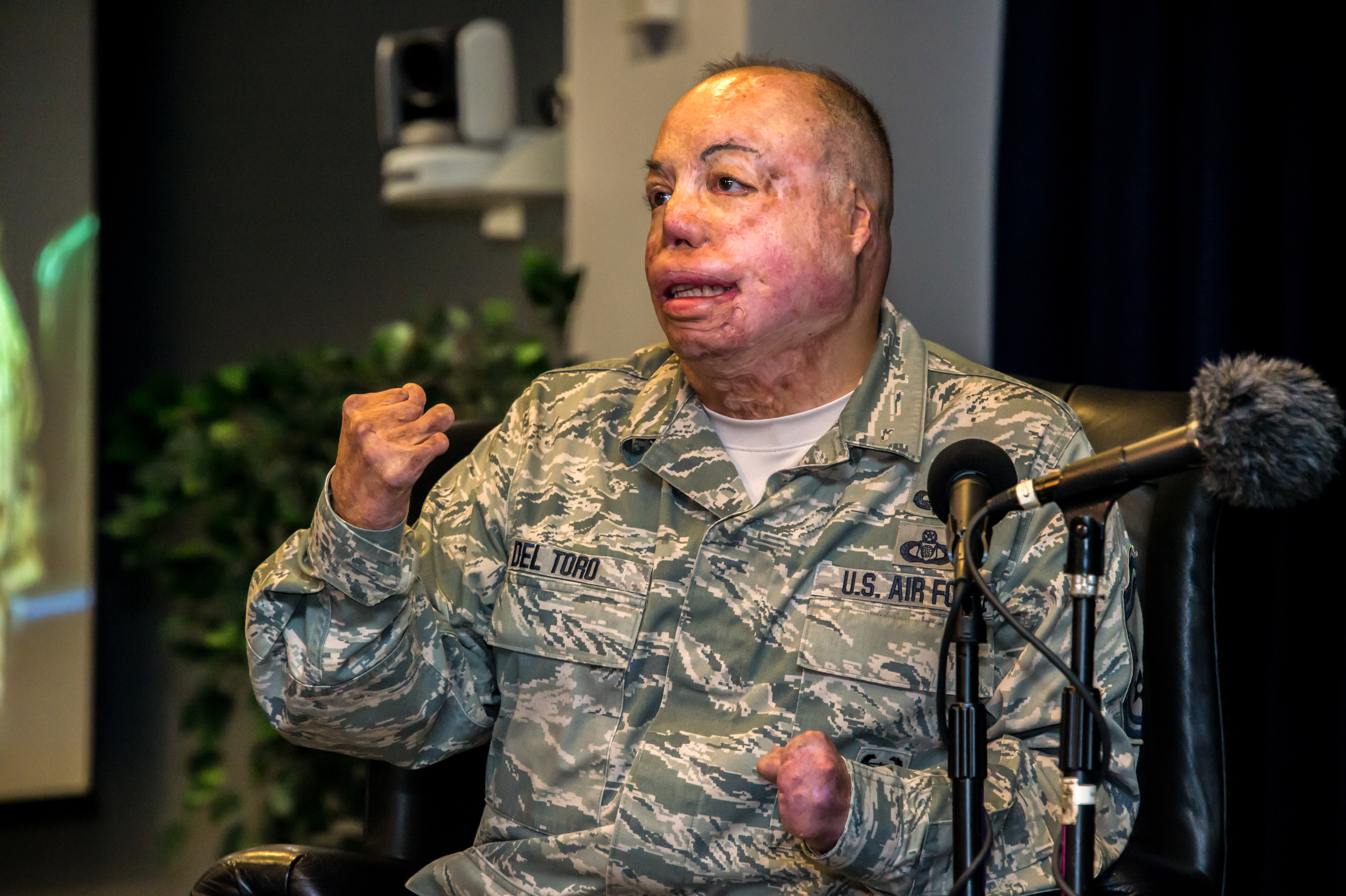
Del Toro in 2018

After reaching the hospital, Del Toro fell into a coma until March of the following year. He received burns to 80 percent of his body, lost roughly 85 pounds, and nearly died on three occasions from burns to his lungs. Doctors believed that he had a 15 percent chance of surviving his injuries, and that he would never be able to walk or breathe without the use of a respirator. To avoid infections, parts of his skin were removed. After waking from his coma at Brooke Army Medical Center, he was kept from seeing his own reflection due to his disfigured state. Upon accidentally seeing himself in a mirror for the first time, he became despondent, fearing that his young son would see him as a monster. However, he later recalled that when he reunited with his son in May 2006, his son quickly embraced him, despite how unrecognizable he was compared to his former appearance. He credited his therapist with greatly aiding his mental recovery after the explosion.

Despite the severity of Del Toro's injuries, after five years and over 100 surgeries, he eventually recovered his strength. Given the choice between retiring from the Air Force and reenlisting as a TACP instructor, Del Toro chose to remain in the Air Force, becoming the first airman to reenlist after being deemed 100 percent disabled. He won a gold medal in shot put at the 2016 Invictus Games and was subsequently selected to the World Class Athlete Program as a parathlete, allowing him to train in shot put ahead of the 2016 Summer Paralympics. He also instructed parachuting at the Air Force Academy, training cadets with the 98th Flying Training Squadron. He retired from the Air Force in 2019 as a senior master sergeant.

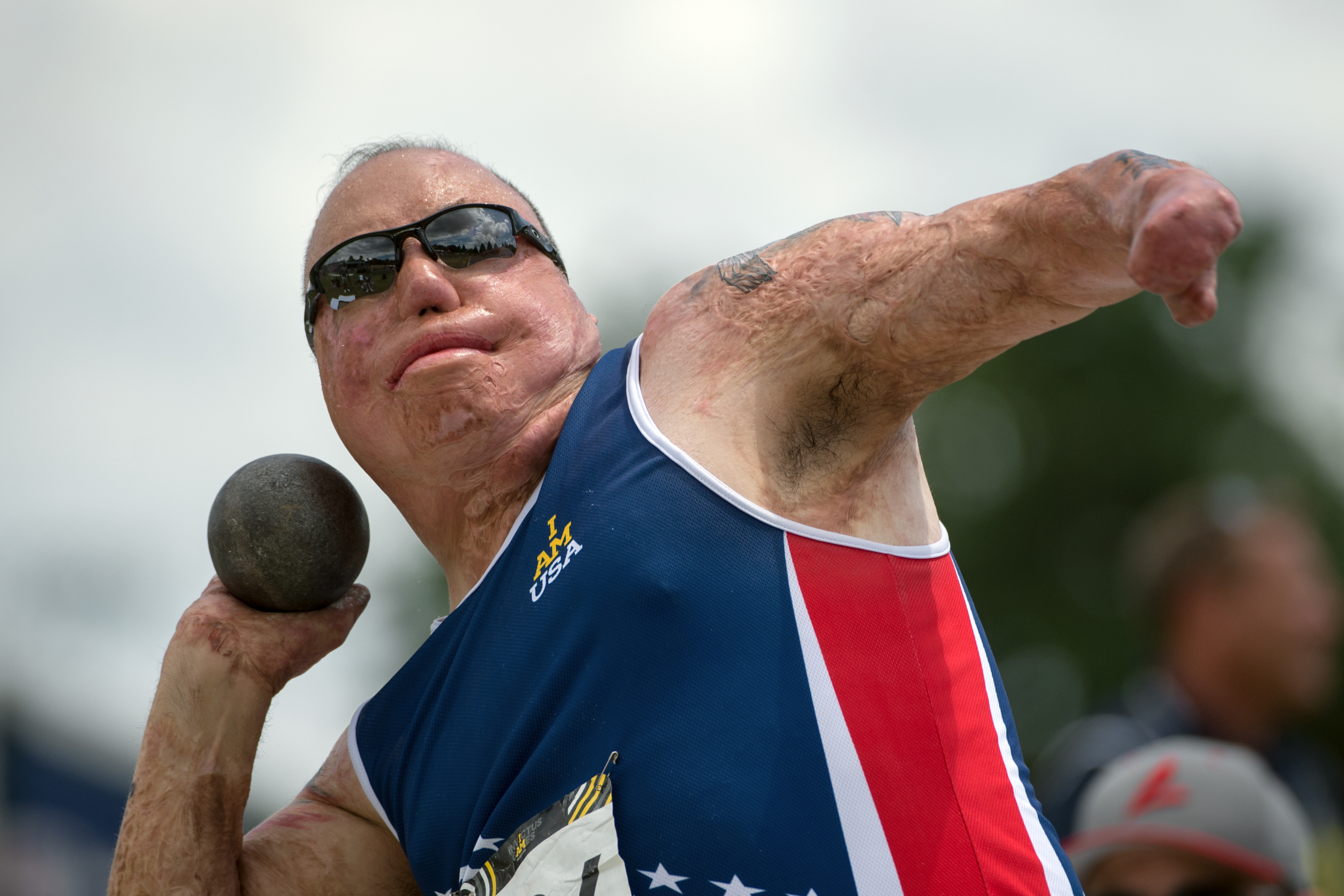
Del Toro at the 2016 Invictus Games

== Personal life ==
Del Toro is married to Carmen Del Toro; the two have a son also named Israel, who was three years old when the explosion occurred. He received the Pat Tillman Award for Service at the 25th ESPY Awards. He studied Sport and Fitness Administration/Management at the University of Illinois Urbana-Champaign, and is a fan of sports, especially field events. After his retirement from the Air Force, Del Toro became a motivational speaker. He made an appearance in the third episode of Bumping Mics with Jeff Ross & Dave Attell. In 2022, the Tunnel to Towers Foundation gifted Del Toro and his family a smart home in Peyton, Colorado.
