= Augustinian Secondary Education Association =

North American secondary education association

The Augustinian Secondary Education Association (ASEA) is an organization founded in 1986 to "foster unity, efficiency, and continued development within the Augustinian ministry to secondary education" in North America. It operates without a budget, acting as a forum for member institutions to share resources, implement Augustinian ideals in the curriculum of its institutions, and to ensure that its member institutions present an "authentic Augustinian identity". It is based in Ojai, California, and reports to the Federation of Augustinians of North America (FANA). Its activity consists of informal networking and inservice programs, as well as annual meetings.

ASEA has eleven member institutions, of which ten are in the United States and one is in Canada.

- Villanova University (Villanova, PA) founded 1842;
- Villanova Preparatory School (Ojai, CA) founded 1924;
- St. Thomas of Villanova College (King City, ON, Canada) founded 1999;
- Merrimack College (North Andover, MA) founded 1947;
- Malvern Preparatory School (Malvern, PA) founded 1842;
- Cascia Hall Preparatory School (Tulsa, OK) founded 1926;
- St. Augustine College Preparatory School (Richland, NJ) founded 1959;
- St. Rita of Cascia High School (Chicago, IL) founded 1905;
- Providence Catholic High School (New Lenox, IL) founded 1918;
- St. Augustine High School (San Diego) (San Diego, CA) founded 1922;
- Austin Catholic Academy (Detroit, MI) founded 2011;
- Austin Preparatory School (Reading, MA) founded 1961.

Of these, Austin Catholic Academy and St. Thomas of Villanova College are independently operated and not officially sponsored by the Augustinian Order.

The association operates the Augustinian Values Institute, a program to define the mission and values for Augustinian schools. The three core principles are "unitas", "veritas", and "caritas" (unity, truth, and charity).
