= Jake Renfro =

American football player

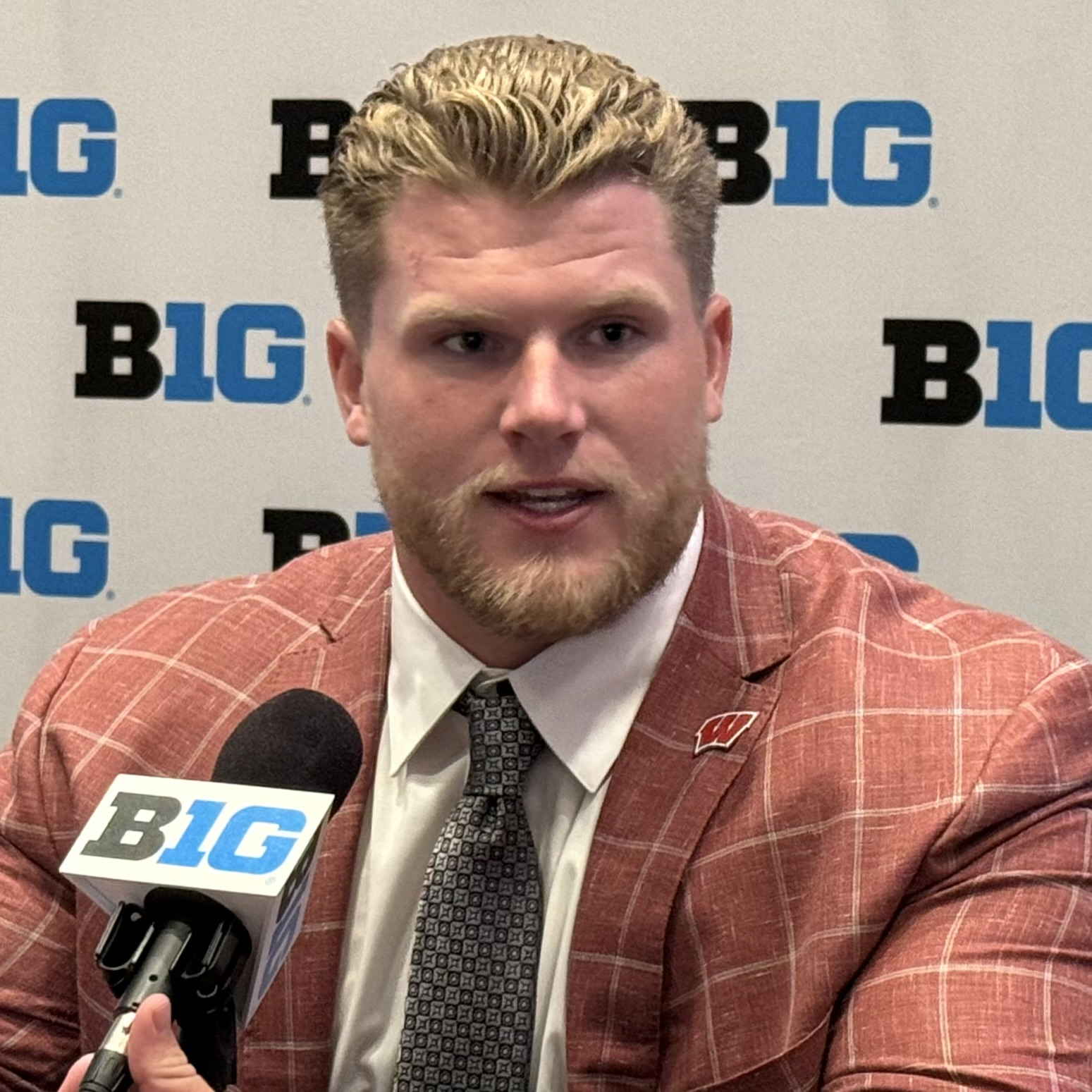
- Renfro at 2025 Big Ten Media Days

No. 57 – Illinois Fighting Illini
- Position: Center
- Class: Redshirt Senior

Personal information
- Listed height: 6 ft 4 in (1.93 m)
- Listed weight: 302 lb (137 kg)

Career information
- High school: Providence Catholic (New Lenox, Illinois)
- College: Cincinnati (2020–2022); Wisconsin (2023–2025); Illinois (2026–present)

Awards and highlights
- First-team All-AAC (2021)
- Stats at ESPN

Jake Renfro is an American college football center who plays for the Illinois Fighting Illini. He previously played for the Cincinnati Bearcats and the Wisconsin Badgers.

== Early life ==
Jake grew up in the south suburbs of Chicago in Mokena, IL.

He attended local powerhouse, Providence Catholic High School, class of 2020. He played football for the Celtics as an Offensive Lineman.

Coming out of high school, Renfro committed to play college football for the Cincinnati Bearcats over other offers such as Illinois, Minnesota, Northwestern and Wisconsin, Columbia, Dartmouth, Princeton, and Yale.

== College career ==
=== Cincinnati ===
As a freshman in 2020, Renfro appeared in seven games with six starts. In 2021, he started all 13 games and earned first-team all-American Athletic Conference honors. However, in 2022, Renfro did not play in any games due to a season-ending knee injury. After the 2022 season, he entered his name into the NCAA transfer portal.

=== Wisconsin ===
Renfro transferred to play for the Wisconsin Badgers. In 2023, he only played in the team's bowl game due to leg and foot injuries. In 2024, Renfro started all 12 games.

Renfro struggled with injuries in 2025, only playing four games before undergoing season-ending surgery in October. Following the season, Renfro announced he would be entering the transfer portal after being granted a seventh year.

=== Illinois ===
On January 5, 2026, Renfro announced he was transferring to the Illinois Fighting Illini.
