= St. Rita of Cascia High School =

Location
- 7740 South Western Avenue; Chicago, Illinois 60620; United States; 41°45′09″N 87°41′06″W

Information
- School type: Private
- Motto: Veritas, Unitas, Caritas (Truth, Unity, Love)
- Religious affiliation: Catholic Church
- Founded: 1905
- Founder: Very Rev. James F. Green
- Authority: Archdiocese of Chicago
- Oversight: Order of Saint Augustine
- CEEB code: 141255
- President: John Donahue
- Chairman: Clare Napleton
- Staff: 84
- Grades: 9–12
- Gender: Boys
- Enrollment: 515
- Average class size: 25
- Campus type: urban
- Colors: red blue
- Song: Hymn to St. Rita
- Fight song: St. Rita Fight Song
- Athletics conference: Chicago Catholic League
- Mascot: Mustangs
- Team name: Mustangs
- Rivals: Mt. Carmel, Br. Rice; Marist; Fenwick; Loyola Academy; Providence; St. Laurence
- Accreditation: North Central Association of Colleges and Schools
- Newspaper: The Ritan
- Yearbook: The Cascian
- Tuition: US$10,800
- Website: http://www.stritahs.com

St. Rita of Cascia High School is an all-boys Catholic high school located in the Ashburn neighborhood on South Side, Chicago, United States. It is part of the Archdiocese of Chicago, is operated by the Province of Our Mother of Good Counsel, a Catholic jurisdiction of the Order of Saint Augustine, and is a member of the Augustinian Secondary Education Association. The school is named for Rita of Cascia (1381–1457), an Italian Augustinian nun and Catholic saint.

== History ==
The high school was founded in 1905 by Augustinian friar Kevin Campbell, O.S.A, who bought the property on which the original school sat for US$30,000 for the 5-acre (20,000 m^{2}) site. Green Hall was the initial building on the original campus. The school was formally dedicated on 22 April 1906, at which time the San Francisco earthquake of four days earlier was invoked.

Successor to the founder was William L. Egan, O.S.A., during whose tenure the original Harris Gym and Egan Hall were completed. In 1922, the school's first stadium was constructed. Joseph B. Kepperling, O.S.A. followed Egan in 1926, but his career was brought to a close by his death in 1929. John J. Harris, O.S.A. was selected as the next rector of St. Rita.

In January 1935, a fire caused extensive damage to the school's shrine after an altar candle was placed too close to a Christmas tree.

In the summer of 1935, Ruellan P. Fink, O.S.A. succeeded Harris. Under Fink's leadership, technical coursework began at the school in 1936. This period also saw the construction of the Mendel Technical Building (1938), and an addition to Egan Hall (1939), which (at the time) made St. Rita the largest all-boys Catholic school in the American Midwest. A fire destroyed the wooden stands in the athletic stadium in 1944, and were soon replaced with concrete bleachers. An April 1939 benefit for the addition included actors Arthur Treacher, Fifi d'Orsay, Eddie Bracken, and Virginia Payne. The new monastery was completed in 1949.

John E. McLaughlin, O.S.A. succeeded Fink in 1956 as principal. In 1962 Francis P. Crawford, O.S.A. became Principal. Crawford was succeeded in 1968 by Daniel B. Trusch, O.S.A. In 1971 LaVern J. Flach, O.S.A. became principal; in 1979 David L. Brecht, O.S.A., in 1983 Patrick E. Murphy, O.S.A. became Principal and in 1989 Bernard R. Danber, O.S.A. was appointed principal. Both Murphy and Danber are graduates of the school.

In 1990 the St. Rita Campus moved from 63rd and Claremont Avenue to its current location at 7740 S. Western Avenue. Prior to St. Rita's renting of the new campus, it had been home to another Catholic high school, Quigley Seminary South High School. The Archdiocese of Chicago closed Quigley South prior to St. Rita's purchase of the property, returning the Chicago minor seminary to its original site at Archbishop Quigley Preparatory Seminary. At the time of the move, St. Rita had been preparing a renovation, but was forced to move when there was a concern over a new school opening on the property. The school's then principal stated: "We could not afford to let another high school open there. We felt that that would be such a threat to us that we would be in danger of closing." The original campus was sold to the Chicago Board of Education for US$1.8 million. The original campus is now the site of Claremont Academy Elementary School.

In 1993 a new president-principal model was adopted for the school. Michael J. O'Connor, O.S.A. became the school's first president. O'Connor appointed Joseph F. Bamberger as principal. In the year 2000 Thomas McCarthy O.S.A. was then named the second president and the first alumnus to be president of St. Rita High School. In the spring of 2002 McCarthy became President-Principal after Joseph F. Bamberger retired. In 2007, Sally Deenihan became not only the twelfth principal in the school's history, but also its first female principal.

In 2012, the school announced that Ernest Mrozek would be the new high school President, a position he held until 2016. Father Thomas McCarthy, O.S.A., continued to serve as both the chairman and the chaplain of the school; he also focused on his new position for the Augustinian Order's new Director of Vocations. In 2023, Deacon John Donahue J.D., Ed.D. was named President. In 2025, the school gained international recognition upon the election of Pope Leo XIV as the first American born Pope. Leo XIV is a Chicago native who previously taught at St. Rita.

=== School crest ===
The colors which predominate the school crest are red and blue, as these are the school colors. The book and the burning and pierced heart are symbols associated with Saint Augustine. The rose and bees are symbols associated with Saint Rita of Cascia.

== Academics ==
Students are placed into one of three academic programs, based on an entrance exam score, and input from parents and previous teachers. The Augustinian Academy is for gifted students, the Mendel Academic Program is a college preparatory program, and the Villanova Academic Study Center is geared toward students requiring more individual academic attention.

As a part of the Augustinian Academy program, the school offers 12 Advanced Placement courses: 2-D Design, Studio Drawing, Calculus, Chemistry, English, Latin, Music Theory, Psychology, Spanish, U.S. History, World History.

== Student life ==
=== Activities ===
The school sponsors 14 extracurricular activities ranging from academic competition and publishing to student government, and performing arts.

The school's music program supports four organizations, three of which are a marching band, a concert band, and a jazz band. There is also a dance and twirling squad (the Ritanettes), made up of girls from local girls' Catholic High schools, which performs with the marching band and at performances in the winter.

=== Athletics ===
St. Rita competes in the Chicago Catholic League (CCL). St. Rita was one of the eight founding members of the league in 1912, and one of five remaining charter members. The school is also a member of the Illinois High School Association (IHSA), the organization which governs most sports and competitive activities in the state.

The school sponsors 12 interscholastic athletics teams which compete in IHSA sponsored state championship tournaments. While not sponsored by the IHSA, the school also sponsors interscholastic teams in ice hockey, and rugby.

St. Rita has won IHSA State Championships in football (1978–79, 2006–07) and wrestling (2002–03, 2003–04).

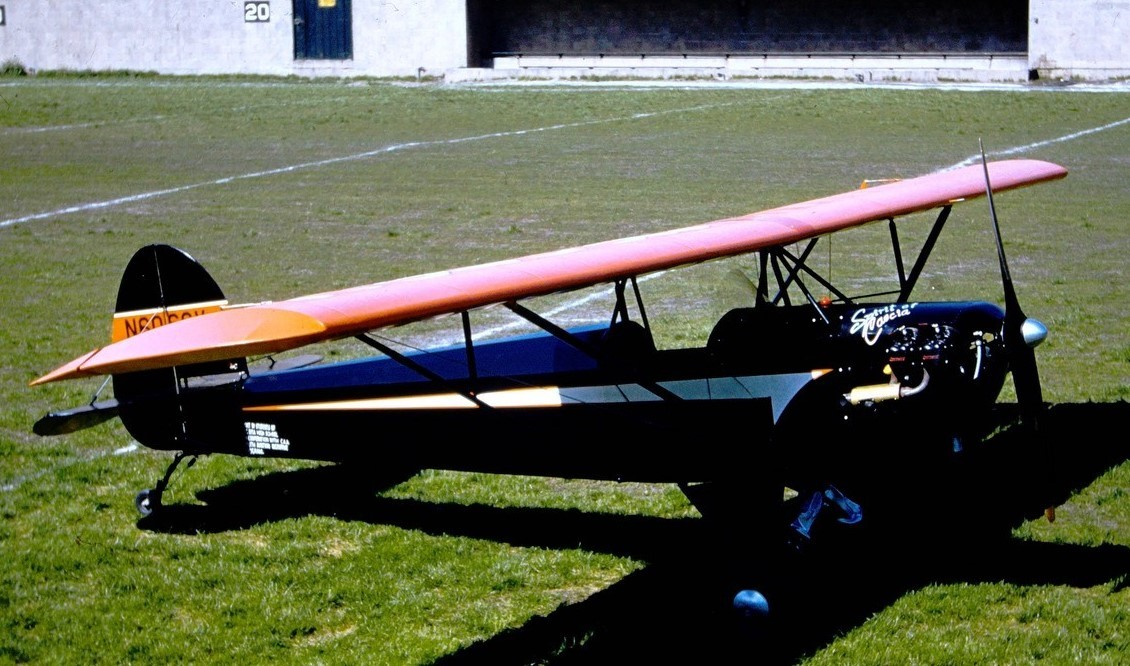
1957 "Spirit of Cascia" Baby Ace airplane built at St. Rita HS – by R. Blacker & students

They also have won many State Titles in baseball and made state many times. St. Rita has participated in nine Prep Bowls, the annual (since 1934) game pitting top teams from the Chicago Public League and the Chicago Catholic League. St. Rita won the game in 1963, 1970, 1971, 1977, 2007, 2009, 2013, 2018, and 2023.

The 1963 football team won the national championship.

In 1924, the school's football team hosted an intramural team from The University of Notre Dame coached by Knute Rockne, losing 6–0.

Because Quigley South did not have a football team, there was no football stadium at the new school building. St. Rita used its old stadium until the end of September 1990 by which time the conversion of Quigley South's soccer field to a football stadium was completed.

The original football stadium at 63rd and Claremont was used in the beginning of the movie Rudy.

== Aviation ==
In 1955, St. Rita of Cascia High School partnered with the Experimental Aircraft Association (EAA) to become the founding High School of EAA's Project Schoolflight, a nationwide youth outreach program. At that

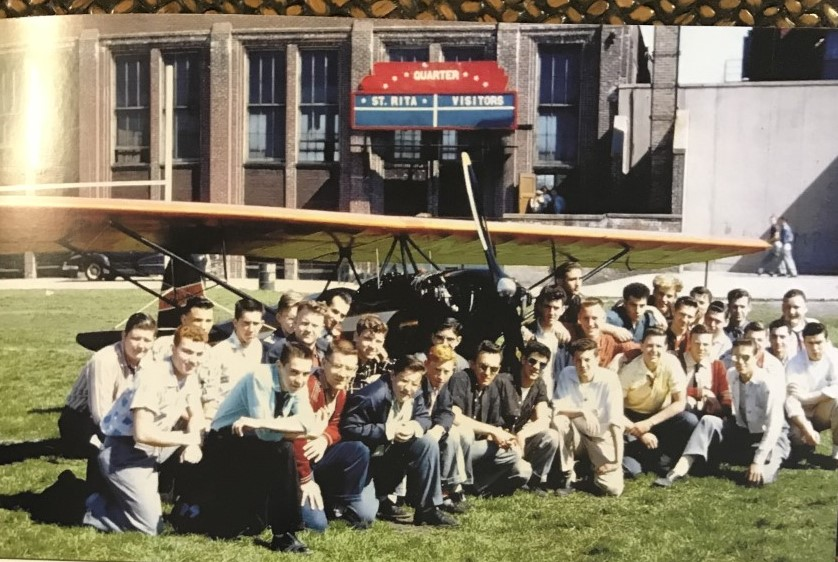
Spirit of Cascia Baby Ace under St. Rita of Cascia Scoreboard- 1957

time, St. Rita had the top Aviation Industrial Arts Program at the High School level in the USA. Robert D. Blacker was St. Rita's Aeronautical Instructor for the program which was inspired by The Reverend Joseph A. Coyne, O.S.A., Dean of St. Rita's Technical Department. Over the next 4 & 1/2 years, Blacker and his students built the first two airplanes for Project Schoolflight. The first one, a Baby Ace airplane completed in 1957, was christened the Spirit of Cascia and the second airplane, completed in early 1960, was the EAA Biplane which is now in the EAA Aviation Museum in Oshkosh, Wisconsin. The Spirit of Cascia, an EAA award-winning plane for Outstanding Achievement at EAA's 1957 Fly-In, is currently at the Historical Aircraft Restoration Museum in Maryland Heights, Mo., where it is being restored (2021).

Blacker helped the students of St. Rita form the first Junior Chapter in EAA history and he also wrote articles in the EAA's Sport Aviation magazine which included photos and stories of St. Rita High School students working on the aircraft. A St. Rita student's real life story of his two years in Blacker's Aviation classes is in the external link below entitled: "From a Baby Ace to a Ford Tri Motor".

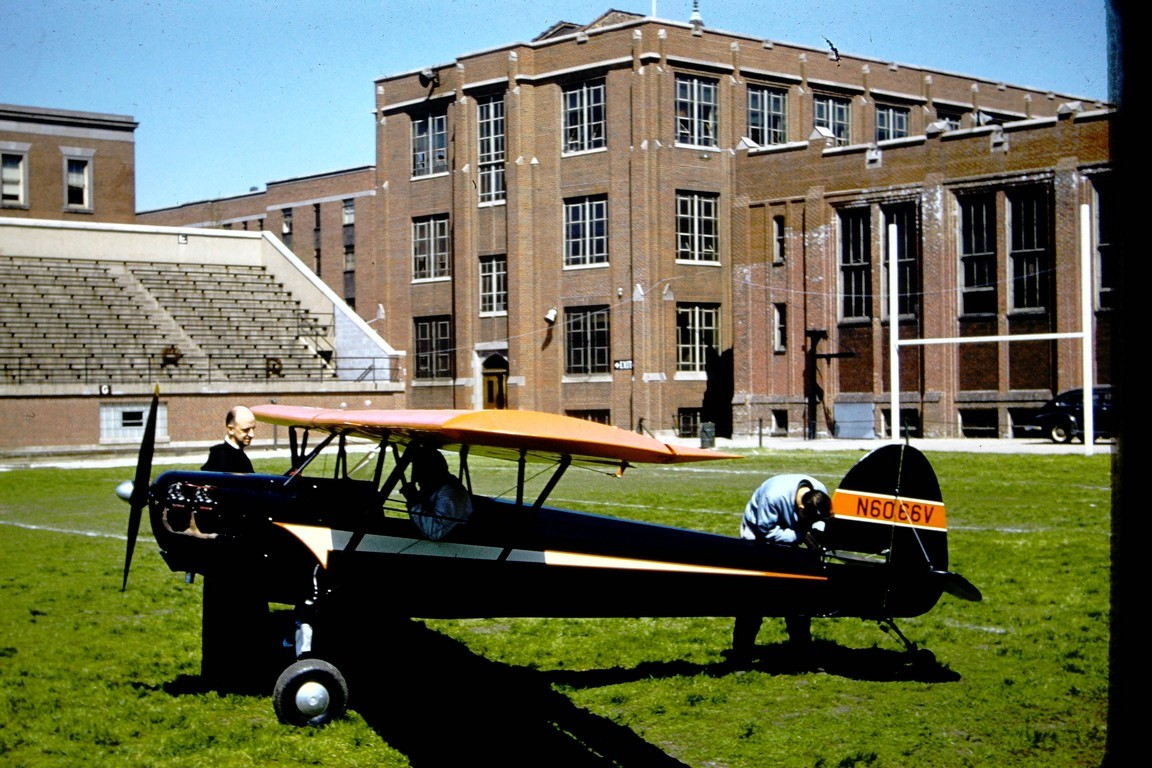
Reverend Joseph Coyne with Spirit of Cascia – St. Rita Stadium-1957

Blacker's 1958 book, Basic Aeronautical Science and Principles of Flight, has an 'In Appreciation' Forward section on page v. which extends "deep gratitude" to The Reverend Coyne.

== Notable alumni ==
- William Joseph Campbell, federal judge (1940–70), Chief Judge of United States District Court for the Northern District of Illinois (1959–70).
- Jim Clancy, MLB pitcher (1977–91), primarily with the Toronto Blue Jays.
- Matthew Conrath, pro football defensive end for the St. Louis Rams and Pittsburgh Steelers of the NFL
- D2x, rapper
- Stuart Dybek, author, poet, and university teacher.
- John Egan, basketball player for Loyola's 1963 national champions
- Nick Etten, Major League Baseball first baseman (1938–39, 1941–47).
- Ed Farmer, Major League Baseball pitcher (1971–74, 1977–83) and the radio voice for the Chicago White Sox.
- Darius Fleming, linebacker who played for Notre Dame and the New England Patriots.
- Jesús "Chuy" García, member of the United States House of Representatives.
- Bruce Gaston, pro football defensive tackle for multiple teams in the NFL
- Kenny Golladay, pro football wide receiver, currently playing for the New York Giants.
- Job (Osacky) of Chicago, archbishop of the Orthodox Church in America's Diocese of the Midwest.
- Mike Kafka, pro football quarterback; previously with the Philadelphia Eagles.
- Edward Guerra Kodatt, member of the Illinois House of Representatives.
- Vic Law, NBA player for the Orlando Magic.
- Charles Matthews, NBA player for the Cleveland Cavaliers.
- Dennis Lick, NFL offensive tackle (1976–81), first-round pick of 1976 NFL draft; played entire career for Chicago Bears.
- Edward Rowan Finnegan, U.S. Representative (1961–64), Circuit Court of Cook County judge (1964–71).
- Ray Manzarek, co-founder and keyboardist for The Doors.
- Ahmad Merritt, former NFL wide receiver (2000–04, 2007–08), primarily with the Chicago Bears.
- Austin O'Connor, two-time NCAA champion wrestler at the University of North Carolina at Chapel Hill.
- Pat O'Connor, football player selected by the Detroit Lions in the 2017 NFL draft.
- Mark Payton, Major League Baseball outfielder for the Cincinnati Reds.
- Ron Sabal, NFL player.
- Tony Simmons, NFL wide receiver (1998–2002), primarily with the New England Patriots; played in Canadian Football League (2004–07), mainly with BC Lions.
- Scipio Spinks, Major League Baseball pitcher (1969–73).
- Gene Stump, DePaul and NBA basketball player.
- Ron Weissenhofer, NFL player.
- Bob Zimny, NFL player.
- Tony Zych, pitcher for MLB's Seattle Mariners.

== Notable faculty ==
- Robert F. Prevost, taught physics and mathematics at the institution (elected in 2025 as Leo XIV, 267th Pope of the Catholic Church); also received honorary degree
