= Phil Gosselin =

American baseball player (born 1988)

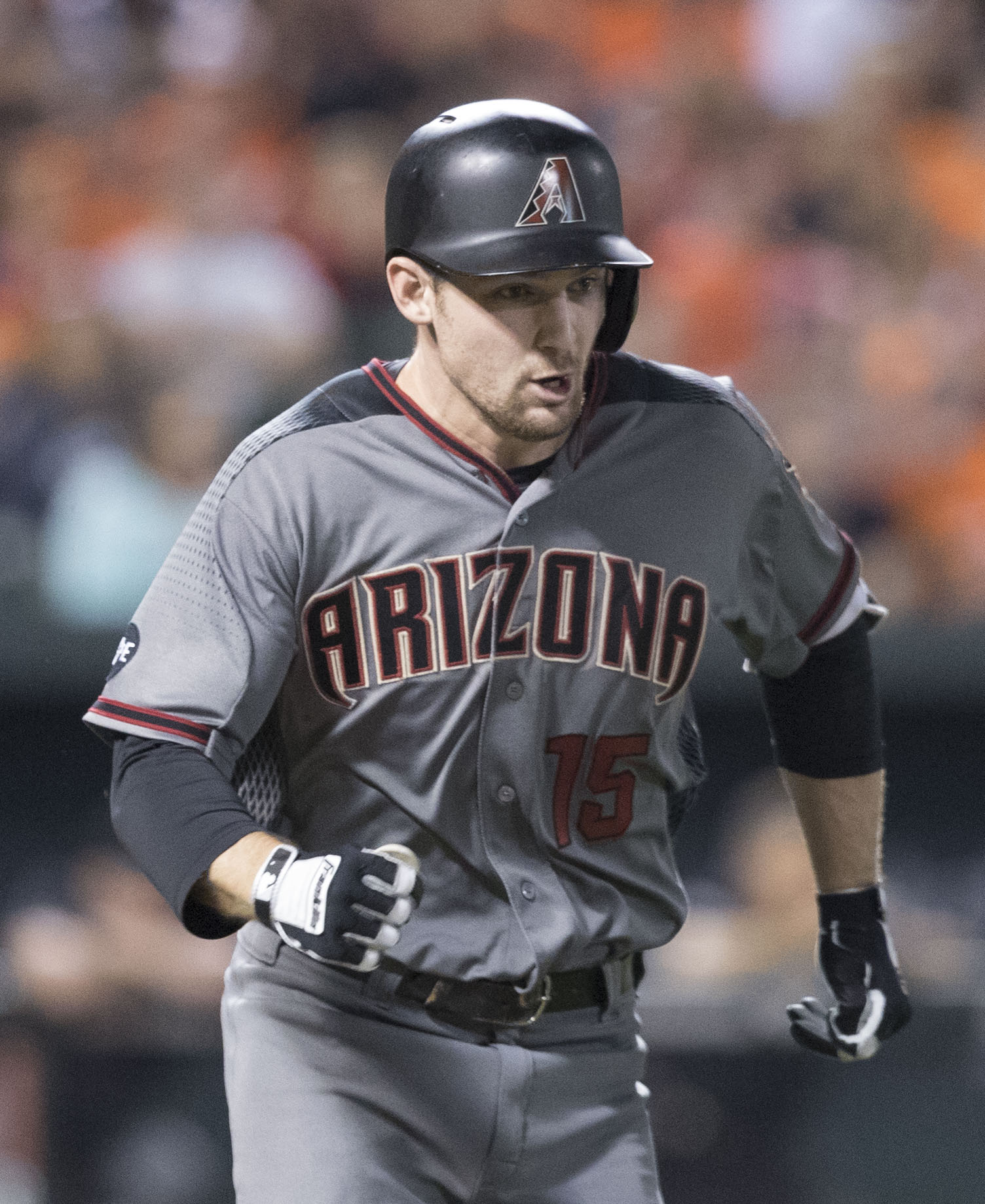
- Gosselin with the Arizona Diamondbacks
- Utility infielder
- Born: October 3, 1988 (age 38); Bryn Mawr, Pennsylvania, U.S.
- Batted: Right Threw: Right

MLB debut
- August 16, 2013, for the Atlanta Braves

Last MLB appearance
- August 24, 2022, for the Los Angeles Angels

MLB statistics
- Batting average: .254
- Home runs: 17
- Runs batted in: 103
- Stats at Baseball Reference

Teams
- Atlanta Braves (2013–2015); Arizona Diamondbacks (2015–2016); Pittsburgh Pirates (2017); Texas Rangers (2017); Cincinnati Reds (2018); Philadelphia Phillies (2019–2020); Los Angeles Angels (2021); Atlanta Braves (2022); Los Angeles Angels (2022)

Philip David Gosselin (nicknamed "Barrels", and "The Goose"; born October 3, 1988), is an American former professional baseball utility infielder. The Atlanta Braves selected Gosselin in the fifth round of the 2010 MLB draft; he made his MLB debut in 2013 with the Braves. He also played in MLB for the Arizona Diamondbacks, Pittsburgh Pirates, Texas Rangers, Cincinnati Reds, Philadelphia Phillies, and Los Angeles Angels.

== Early life ==
Gosselin was born in Bryn Mawr, Pennsylvania, and raised in West Chester, Pennsylvania. He graduated from Malvern Preparatory School ('07), where he played shortstop on the baseball team.

Gosselin then attended the University of Virginia, where he played college baseball for the Virginia Cavaliers. As a junior in 2009 Gosselin set a university record for hits in a season (100) while batting .382 (mostly as the leadoff hitter) as he earned First-Team All-ACC and Third-Team All-America honors. After the 2009 season, he played collegiate summer baseball with the Harwich Mariners of the Cape Cod Baseball League. Gosselin ranks 6th in Virginia history in career doubles (50), and 10th in RBIs (145) and total bases (345).

== Playing career ==
=== Atlanta Braves ===
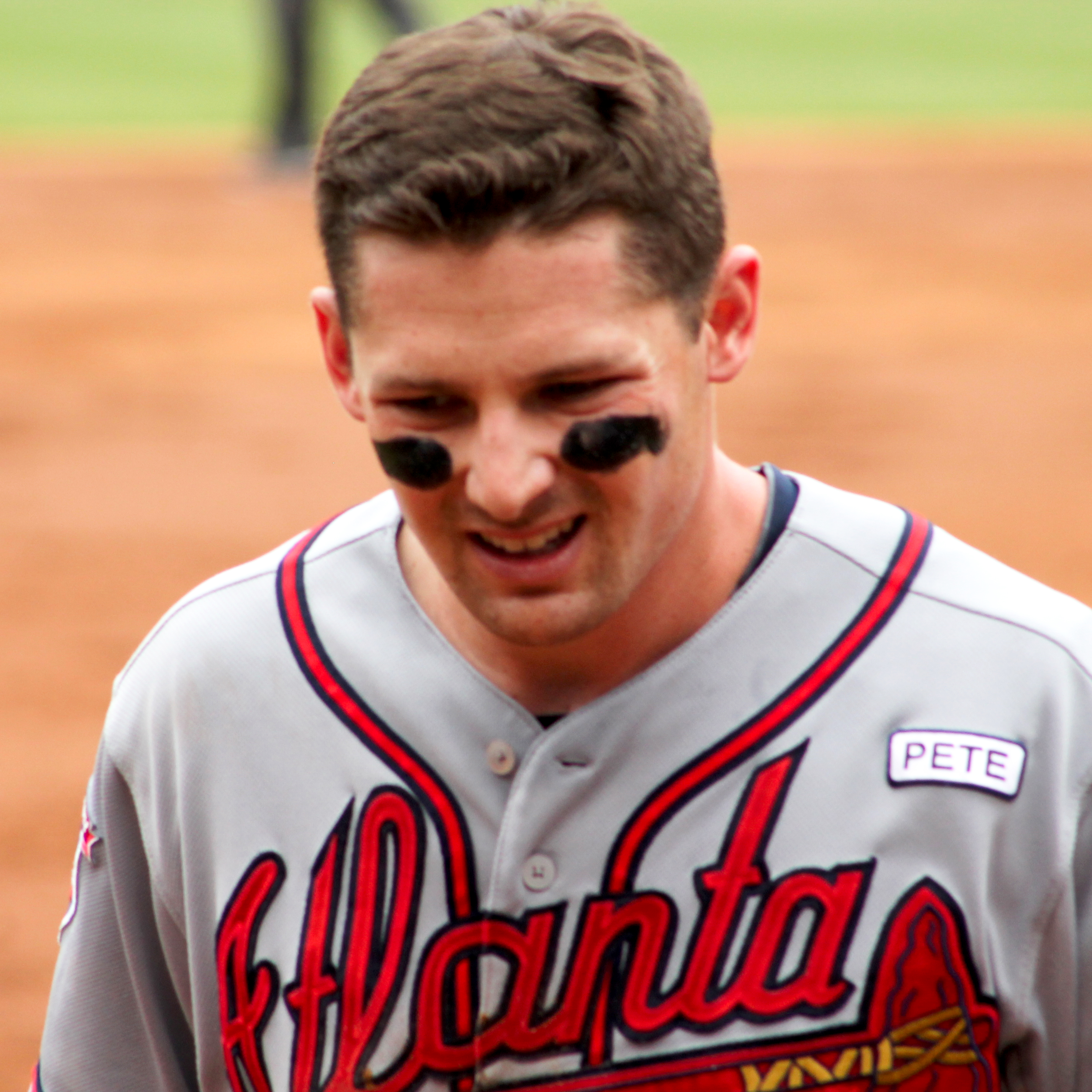
Gosselin during his tenure with the Atlanta Braves in 2014

The Atlanta Braves selected Gosselin in the fifth round of the 2010 Major League Baseball draft.

Gosselin was called up to the majors for the first time on August 16, 2013. He debuted the same day, in the tenth inning of a game against the Washington Nationals. Gosselin was outrighted off the Braves roster on November 5, 2013.

Gosselin was called back up by the Braves on July 13, 2014, when Dan Uggla was suspended by the team for one day. Gosselin was again recalled by the Braves on July 26 after Uggla was released. On August 15, Gosselin hit his first MLB home run, against the Oakland Athletics. He batted .266/.304/.320 in 378 at bats for the Atlanta Braves in 128 games. In the minors, as he batted .344 (second in the International League)/.379/.487 with 5 triples (tied for 7th in the league) for the Gwinnett Braves, he was named a 2014 International League mid-season and post-season All Star, and Player of the Week on July 14.

Gosselin made the Braves' Opening Day roster in 2015, and batted .325/.357/.425 in 40 at bats over 20 games before fracturing his left thumb against the Miami Marlins on May 17 while diving for a ground ball. The injury required surgery, and Gosselin missed eight weeks of the season.

=== Arizona Diamondbacks ===
On June 20, 2015, Gosselin was traded to the Arizona Diamondbacks for Bronson Arroyo and Touki Toussaint.

On September 29, Gosselin recorded his first career walk-off hit with a bases-loaded RBI single against the Colorado Rockies. This gave the Diamondbacks a 4–3 win in 11 innings. In 2015 with Arizona he batted .303/.382/.545, with 3 home runs, and 13 RBIs, in 66 at bats.

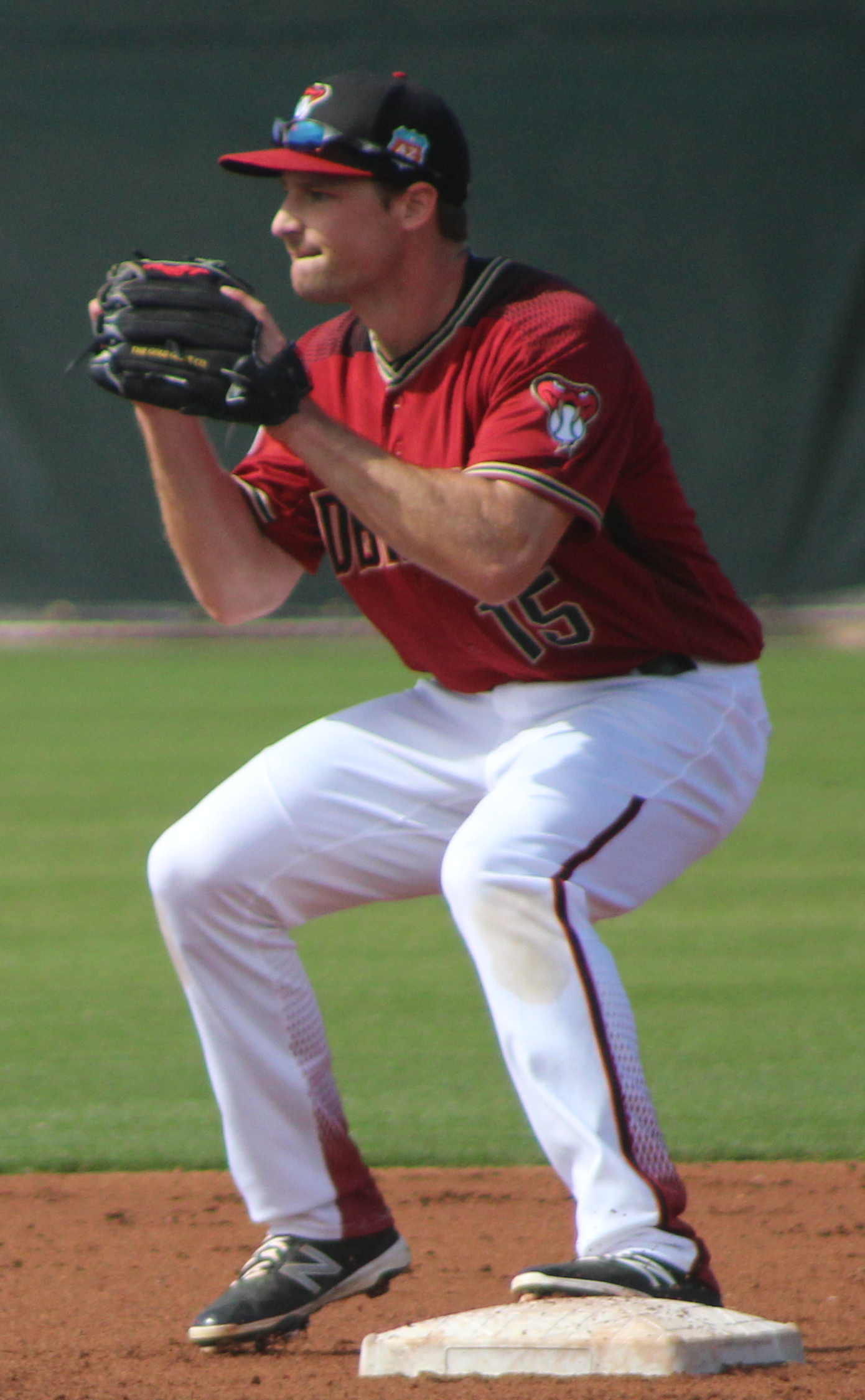
Gosselin in 2016

In 2016 Gosselin batted .277/.324/.368 with Arizona, with two home runs, and 13 RBIs, in 220 at bats. He led all big league pinch hitters in hits, with 20.

Gosselin was designated for assignment by the Diamondbacks on February 7, 2017.

=== Pittsburgh Pirates ===
On February 10, 2017, Gosselin was traded to the Pittsburgh Pirates in exchange for minor league pitcher Frank Duncan, but only had 40 at–bats for the team. With the Triple–A Indianapolis Indians, he hit .266/.304/.336 in 241 at–bats.

=== Texas Rangers ===
Gosselin was claimed off waivers by the Texas Rangers on August 12, 2017. He made 12 appearances for Texas, going 1–for–8 (.125). On October 10, Gosselin was removed from the 40–man roster and sent outright to the Triple–A Round Rock Express.

=== Cincinnati Reds ===
On January 2, 2018, Gosselin signed a minor league contract with the yankees and Cincinnati Reds. He earned a spot on the Reds' Opening Day roster, but only had 24 at–bats for the team.

=== Atlanta Braves (second stint) ===
The Atlanta Braves claimed Gosselin off waivers on May 3, 2018. The Braves designated him for assignment on June 24, subsequently outrighting him to the Triple-A Gwinnett Stripers. Gosselin declared free agency on October 9.

In the major leagues, through 2018 Gosselin had played 97 games at second base, 37 games at third base, 11 games at shortstop, eight games at first base, and eight games in the outfield.

=== Philadelphia Phillies ===
On December 21, 2018, Gosselin signed a minor league deal as a free agent with the Philadelphia Phillies. While with the 2019 Triple–A Lehigh Valley IronPigs, he batted .314/.405 (8th in the league)/.497, with five triples (tied for 7th), eight home runs, and 47 RBIs, in 296 at bats, playing primarily second base.

Gosselin's 2019 MLB Phillies stat line included batting .262/.294/.308, with three doubles, no home runs, and seven RBIs, in 65 at bats; he pinch hit 35 times and played six games in left field, five games at shortstop, and one game at third base.

On December 12, 2019, Gosselin was re-signed to a minor league contract by the Phillies, with an invitation to 2020 spring training. On July 24, 2020, Gosselin had his contract selected to the 40-man roster, and the 30-man active roster. He made his 2020 Phillies debut on July 25, in the starting lineup, against the Miami Marlins by going 3–3 with 2 home runs. Gosselin sustained his hitting as the season went on, prompting manager Joe Girardi to start Gosselin whenever the opposing starting pitcher was a lefty. He also took online college courses from UVA during the season to complete his bachelor's degree in economics. On October 30, Gosselin was outrighted off of the 40-man roster and elected free agency.

=== Los Angeles Angels ===
On February 9, 2021, Gosselin signed a minor league contract with the Los Angeles Angels organization that included an invitation to spring training. On May 4, 2021, Gosselin was selected to the active roster.

On November 30, Gosselin was non-tendered by the Angels, making him a free agent.

=== Atlanta Braves (third stint) ===
On March 19, 2022, Gosselin signed a minor league contract to return to the Atlanta Braves. The Braves promoted him to the majors on June 14. The Braves designated Gosselin for assignment on July 11.

=== Los Angeles Angels (second stint) ===
On July 18, 2022, Gosselin was claimed off waivers by the Los Angeles Angels. On August 23, 2022, against the Tampa Bay Rays, Gosselin made his first professional pitching appearance, pitching a 1-2-3 inning. On August 25, Gosselin was designated for assignment. In 22 games with the Angels, he batted .098/.132/.137 with 2 RBIs. He became a free agent on September 1.

== Post-playing career ==
On February 5, 2024, the Philadelphia Phillies hired Gosselin to serve as a special assignment analyst in their baseball operations department.
