= Ron Weissenhofer =

American football player (born 1964)

No. 56
- Position: Linebacker

Personal information
- Born: February 3, 1964 (age 62); Chicago, Illinois, U.S.
- Listed height: 6 ft 3 in (1.91 m)
- Listed weight: 235 lb (107 kg)

Career information
- High school: St. Rita of Cascia (Chicago)
- College: Notre Dame
- NFL draft: 1987: undrafted

Career history
- New Orleans Saints (1987)

Career NFL statistics
- Games played: 1
- Stats at Pro Football Reference

Ronald Allen Weissenhofer (born February 3, 1964) is an American former professional football player who was a linebacker in the National Football League (NFL). He played college football for the Notre Dame Fighting Irish. Weissenhofer played one game in the NFL for the New Orleans Saints in 1987.
