= Dude Wipes =

Specially marketed disposable wipe product

Dude Products
- Industry: Consumer packaged goods
- Founded: 2012; 14 years ago
- Founders: Sean Dudlicek; Brian Wilkin; Ryan Meegan; Jeff Klimkowski
- Headquarters: Chicago, US
- Website: Dude Products

Dude Wipes are a disposable wipe product manufactured by Dude Products, a personal care brand based in Chicago. Dude Wipes was launched in 2012 and received the 2013 Visionary Award at the Vision 2013 Consumer Products Conference.

== History ==
Dude Wipes were invented by founders and childhood friends Sean Riley, Brian Wilkin, Ryan Meegan, and Jeff Klimkowski from their apartment in Chicago, Illinois in 2010. It was marketed as a flushable personal wipe specifically for men, as an alternative to traditional baby wipes.

The product became available to consumers in retail stores and online in 2012, and is now available in Kroger, Target, Meijer, Ralphs, and Bass Pro Shops nationwide.

In 2015, the founders of Dude Products appeared on ABC reality television program Shark Tank, and secured a $300,000 investment from Dallas Mavericks owner Mark Cuban for a 25% stake in the company.

In 2018, Dude Products were selected by Walmart for nationwide distribution as part of their Made in the USA program, which pledged to source $250 billion in US-made products by 2023.

In 2023, Dude Products reached a settlement in a class action lawsuit (Darnall et al. v. Dude Products, Inc., Circuit Court of DuPage County, Illinois, 18th Judicial Circuit Case No. 2023LA000761) while continuing to deny any wrongdoing, as well as denying the class representatives' allegations that the wipes claimed to be flushable are not flushable. Dude Wipes has agreed to a $9 million class action settlement.

== Promotion ==
During UFC 174, Dude Wipes trended worldwide on Twitter after sponsoring fighter Tyron Woodley, with their logo appearing on his trunks. Dude Products also sponsored UFC fighter Justine Kish after she lost control of her bowels in the ring during a choke hold.

In 2015, Dude Wipes were featured on an episode of Rob Dyrdek's Fantasy Factory.

In 2016, signs for Dude Wipes appeared numerous times during Fox's broadcast of the 2016 World Series at Wrigley Field as part of a guerrilla marketing campaign.

After Arizona Diamondbacks pitcher Archie Bradley revealed in an interview that he had a bowel accident while pitching during a game, Dude Products sent him a shipment of Dude Wipes, which Bradley shared on social media and subsequently went viral.

In October 2018, Dude Wipes struck an endorsement deal with New York Jets running back Isaiah Crowell after Crowell celebrated a touchdown against the Cleveland Browns by pretending to wipe his behind with the football.

During WWE’s WrestleMania XL in April 2024, the Dude Wipes logo was consistently displayed, surrounding the ring and venue during matches, as millions watched the global event. They have gone on to sponsor other WWE premium live events, including SummerSlam 2024, where announcer Pat McAfee referred to wrestler Dominik Mysterio on commentary as "a Dude Wipe after you wiped."

=== Motorsports ===
Dude Wipes, in 2018, began sponsoring Matt DiBenedetto and the No. 32 Go Fas Racing team in the NASCAR Cup Series beginning at Pocono in July. In 2020, Anthony Alfredo became the ambassador for the brand while he drove in the NASCAR Xfinity Series with Richard Childress Racing. The company has followed Alfredo to the Cup Series and back to the Xfinity Series despite several changes in teams.

The company also sponsored the Dude Wipes 250 at Martinsville Speedway.
