= Providence Catholic High School =

Location
- 1800 West Lincoln Highway; New Lenox, Illinois 60451; United States; 41.5209°N 88.0002°W

Information
- Type: private secondary
- Motto: Truth, Unity, & Love
- Denomination: Roman Catholic
- Established: 1880
- Authority: Diocese of Joliet
- Oversight: Order of Saint Augustine
- President: Fr. John Merkelis, OSA
- Principal: Paul Houston
- Teaching staff: 63
- Grades: 9–12
- Enrollment: 712 (2026)
- Average class size: 23
- Campus size: 75 Acres
- Campus type: suburban
- Colors: kelly green White
- Slogan: Jesus Christ is the reason for our School
- Athletics conference: Chicago Catholic League
- Mascot: Charlie Celtic
- Team name: Celtics
- Accreditation: North Central Association of Colleges and Schools
- Newspaper: Proviscope
- Yearbook: Kelt
- Website: providencecatholic.org

Providence Catholic High School (often referred to as Providence, Provi, or abbreviated PCHS) is a Roman Catholic secondary school located in New Lenox, Illinois. Located in the Roman Catholic Diocese of Joliet, Providence Catholic is a private school run by the Order of Saint Augustine and is a member of the Augustinian Secondary Education Association. Known for its exceptional athletic program, the school holds the Illinois private school record with the most IHSA State Championships.

The school is located at the crossroads of Lincoln Highway (also part of U.S. Highway 30) and Interstate 80.

== History ==
Providence Catholic High School began as St. Mary Academy for Girls, a commercial school in Joliet, Illinois run by the Sisters of Loretto. The school opened in 1880, though the original building was not opened until 1883. Eventually, academic classes were added.

In 1918, the Archdiocese of Chicago invited the Sisters of Providence to take over the school. On October 22 of that year, the school's name was changed to Providence High School. In 1931, the academic classes were stopped as the Great Depression took its toll on the school. In 1932, the school reverted to a two-year commercial school. A four-year secretarial program opened in 1938. Though the academic courses were reinstated after the Depression, the school building was condemned as a fire hazard in 1959 and demolished. From 1959 through 1962, the school met at St. Mary Nativity Elementary School. When the old building was demolished, it is said that students sifted through the wreckage looking for bricks that were not crushed. They wrapped the bricks and sold them as souvenirs to help build the new Providence.

In 1962, the modern Providence High School was opened. The most obvious change was location: the school had left Joliet and was now located a few miles to the east in New Lenox. The other major change was the shift to a coed school. Though Providence was a relatively new school, the community of New Lenox was not heavily populated then. Enrollment decreased, and the school began suffering financially. Father Roger Kaffer (later Bishop Kaffer) was named the new principal and arrived in 1970. He began a campaign to improve the academic standing of the school and the transportation options for students traveling great distances. It was his practice to visit every family that had a child enrolled in the school. The 1971 enrollment was 490; by 1975, it had reached 785. Growth during the late 1970s and early 1980s made additions to the school building necessary.

The Province of Our Mother of Good Counsel, the Midwest U.S. province of the Order of Saint Augustine, was invited by the diocese to take control of the school after the 1984–85 school year. A college preparatory curriculum was added, as was a refocus on the spiritual mission of the school. The religious studies course work was upgraded, and a retreat program was begun. The name of the school was changed to "Providence Catholic High School" in 1985 to reflect these changes. In 1998, the school decided to limit enrollment in order to retain a more personal atmosphere with students. The school has added 55,000 square feet to the original building with the addition of a science and fine arts wing in 2002 and a Student Commons Addition in 2018. Today the school sits on 75 acres with three campuses.

In 2018, the school celebrated its 100th anniversary as Providence Catholic High School.

== Academics ==
Providence is a college preparatory school, and uses a weighted grading system.

The school offers eighteen Advanced Placement courses: English Language, English Literature, Statistics, Calculus (AB), Calculus (BC), Biology, U.S. History, U.S. Government & Politics, European History, Psychology, Spanish Language, Music Theory, AP Computer Science and Studio Art.

== Athletics ==
Wall of IHSA Championship banners in the Sacred Heart Gymnasium

Providence Catholic High School holds a record 33 team state championships. No other private High School in Illinois has more. The Providence Celtics compete in two conferences. Men's teams compete in the Chicago Catholic League (CCL), while the women compete in the Girls Catholic Athletic Conference (GCAC). Providence competes in state tournaments sponsored by the Illinois High School Association (IHSA).

The school sponsors teams for men and women in basketball, cross country, golf, soccer, tennis, track & field, lacrosse and volleyball. Men may also compete in baseball, bowling, football, lacrosse and wrestling. Women may compete in cheerleading, dance and softball.

Bishop Kaffer Stadium at Matt Senffner Field
- “The Emerald Isle”
- Address: 1800 W Lincoln Hwy; New Lenox, Illinois; United States
- Capacity: 6,000
- Type: Stadium
- Surface: Artificial Turf
- Current use: Football
- Public transit: RI at New Lenox station (Metra)

Construction
- Opened: 1968
- Renovated: 2004 (home bleachers), 2012 (turf), 2025 (away bleachers)

Tenants
- Providence Catholic Football, Soccer, Lacrosse, Track & Field

Football (10 titles)

1987, 1991, 1994, 1995, 1996, 1997, 2001, 2002, 2004, 2014.

Starting in 1968, the program has made numerous state title-game appearances (around 14–15 total) and is ranked among the top historical programs in the IHSA playoff era.

Under legendary coach Matt Senffner, the Celtics won nine state titles, including four consecutive championships from 1994 to 1997, and compiled a 50-game win streak. During the 1990s, the program was ranked as high as ninth nationally.

Coach Senffner retired after the 2005 season. Senffner compiled a 300-114-1 record in 38 seasons, and retired as Illinois’ all-time winningest head coach.

In 2014, Former Senffner-era defensive coordinator, Head Coach Mark Coglianese led the Celtics on their “Quest for X,” capturing the program’s 10th state championship.

The IHSA just ranked them the 4th best program of the entire playoff era.

Wrestling (10 titles)

1978, 1981, 1988, 1989, 1997, 1998, 1999, 2000, 2001, 2002.

Includes a state-record six consecutive titles (1997–2002) under Coach Keith Healy. The program also has a strong history of individual state champions and All-State placers.

The Ruettiger family played a foundational and highly prominent role in establishing Providence's wrestling excellence in the program's early years. Majority of the Ruettiger family (related to the famous "Rudy" Ruettiger of Notre Dame football fame) attended Providence and helped build the Celtics into a powerhouse.

Baseball (6 titles)

Press Box and Dugout view of Tom Dedin Field on the southeast side of Providence Catholic's campus

1978, 1982, 2014, 2015, 2016, 2024.

Providence baseball is considered the best program in the modern IHSA playoff era. The 2014–2016 run was the first three-peat in IHSA baseball history. The 2024 Class 4A title set a new Illinois record for most state titles by one baseball program.

The program is ran by legendary coach, Mark Smith. It has produced countless of college baseball players and many MLB players.

Dance (2 titles)

2021, 2025 (both Class 1A).

The 2025 win was the school’s 33rd overall team state title.

Other sports (1 each)

• Boys’ Basketball — 1979

• Cheerleading — 2013

• Hockey — 2009

• Pom Pons — 2004

• Girls’ Track — 1978

The Providence Catholic Hockey program is well-known throughout the area. Winning the CCHL Kennedy Cup in 2014, 2016, and 2017. Also being in the IHSA Final Four in 2014, 2016, 2017, and 2019.

== Student life ==
=== Clubs and activities ===
Fine Arts

The marching band started their first competitive season in 2006 and since then, had received awards and recognition in several fields in local/regional, state, and national competitions such as Bands of America. They also have performed at the halftime show of the 2010 Outback Bowl. The marching band placed in states competition in their classification for the first time in the school's history at Illinois State University in class 2A in 2019. For the 2020-2021 school year, with several closures and cancellations of on-site competitions due to COVID-19, the marching band participated through virtual competitions that were hosted through USBands and The Cavaliers GearWORKS. On October 31, 2020, the marching band placed 1st for the state of Illinois in class 1A through USBands. On November 7, 2020, they placed 3rd place in the nation in class 1A with first place in the Visual caption and overall Midwest Regional Champions. In the 2021 marching band season, the band placed 2nd in States in class 2A and made school history by performing in Finals for the first time at ISU placing 15th.

The winter guard first started their competitive program in 2002, in which they compete in the MidWest Color Guard Circuit (also known as MWCGC, a local circuit that uses the WGI competing format, and utilizes several similar competing rules and regulations), where they currently are in class SRA and obtained several placement titles since their introduction to the circuit. During the 2021 virtual season during the COVID-19 Lockdowns, they competed virtually through the MWCGC, MAIN through USBands, and WGI, in which they have competed in since. The choir, jazz, and concert band departments performs in performances through ILMEA, IHSA, Midwest Music Festival, and Music for All in which they have several awards and medals for both groups and solo performances.

== Providence Catholic Children's Academy ==
On the east side of campus, they have the Providence Catholic Children's Academy for ages 3–5. Three- and four-year-olds may take half-day preschool classes, while five-year-olds may attend full-day kindergarten.

== Notable alumni ==
- Israel Del Toro (class of 1993), Pat Tillman Award recipient for Service at the 25th ESPY Awards, Purple Heart recipient, American Motivational Speaker, retired Senior Master Sargent in the United States Air Force.
- Brad Guzan (class of 2003), Soccer Goalkeeper, played for Chivas USA and now Atlanta United of Major League Soccer, the US National Team, and Aston Villa and Middlesbrough for the Premier League
- Eric Steinbach (class of 1998), NFL football player, Offensive Guard for the Cincinnati Bengals and Cleveland Browns
- Ryan Meegan (class of 2003), Co-Founder of Dude Wipes
- Jeff Klimkowski (class of 2003), Co-Founder of Dude Wipes
- Pete Bercich (class of 1990), NFL Linebacker, Minnesota Vikings , commentator for the Viking Radio Network.
- Mike Uremovich (class of 1997), Head Football Coach for the Ball State University
- Walter Downing (Class of 1981), The first basketball player in Illinois to win the Mr. Basketball award. Selected as a McDonald's All-American alongside Michael Jordan and Patrick Ewing, later playing for Marquette and DePaul.
- Miles Boykin (class of 2015), former NFL Wide Receiver, Chicago Bears
- Sean Bormet (class of 1989), former NCAA All-American wrestler at the University of Michigan and current Head Wrestling Coach for the Michigan Wolverines.
- Jameson Geers (class of 2021), Tight end at the Minnesota Golden Gophers
- Tavaras Hardy (class of 1998), Head Basketball Coach at the University of Loyola Maryland
- Yvette Healy (class of 1995), Head Softball Coach and the University of Wisconsin-Madison
- Carmen Pignatiello (class of 2000), MLB pitcher, Chicago Cubs (2008)
- Bryan Rekar (class of 1990), MLB pitcher, Colorado Rockies and Tampa Bay Rays
- Mariano Sori-Marin (class of 2018), Football Linebacker at the Minnesota Golden Gophers from 2018 to 2022; Linebackers Coach at the Minnesota Golden Gophers
- Jake Renfro, (class of 2020), Offensive Lineman, Rimington Trophy Watch List player, and Team Captain at the University of Illinois.
- Sam Travis (class of 2011), MLB First Baseman, Boston Red Sox
