= Villanova Preparatory School =

School in Ojai, California, United States

- Villanova/ Nova

Location
- 12096 North Ventura Avenue; Ojai, California, U.S. Ojai, (Ventura County), California 93023; United States; 34°25′47″N 119°15′50″W

Information
- Type: Private, Coeducational, day/boarding school
- Motto: Unitas, Veritas, Caritas (Latin: Unity, Truth, Love)
- Religious affiliations: Roman Catholic; Order of Saint Augustine
- Patron saint: St. Thomas of Villanova
- Established: 1924
- Oversight: Order of St. Augustine
- Headmaster: Gabriel Enriquez
- Grades: 6 —12
- Enrollment: 285 (2024-25)
- Average class size: 15
- Campus type: Country
- Colors: Navy, white, and gray
- Song: Alma Mater (When the Twilight Shadows Gather)
- Fight song: Oh no. Here we Go. Nova.
- Athletics conference: CIF Southern Section; Tri-County Athletic Association
- Team name: Wildcats
- Accreditation: Western Association of Schools and Colleges
- Newspaper: Nova Notes; Vista
- Yearbook: The Villanovan
- Tuition: $24,900 (Day), $68,500 (Boarding)
- Website: Villanova Prep

Villanova Preparatory School (commonly known as Villanova Prep) is an Augustinian Catholic co-ed day and boarding school in Ojai, California, United States. Sitting on more than 130 acres (53 ha), the campus contains two dormitories, a chapel, trails, and assorted academic and athletic facilities. Villanova Prep is located in the Roman Catholic Archdiocese of Los Angeles, and is a member of the Augustinian Secondary Education Association. The school offers both day and resident programs and is the only co-ed Augustinian boarding school in the United States.

In 2015-16, Villanova Prep's student enrollment was 265. Boarding students comprised 34% of the student body and represented 14 countries.

== History ==
Villanova Preparatory School was established in 1924 at the request of Archbishop John Cantwell, the first head of the Roman Catholic Archdiocese of Los Angeles. The school was founded by Augustinians from Villanova, Pennsylvania who were invited to California to open parishes in the early 1920s.

== Academics ==
Villanova Prep offers a college preparatory curriculum for grades 9–12. In 2015, the school began offering the IB Diploma Programme for its junior and senior students.

Villanova Prep is one of only a few schools, and the only high school, that is a designated Clare Boothe Luce Program recipient. The program encourages young women to enter, study, and teach in the STEM fields. Each year, Clare Boothe Luce Program members participate in educational field trips such as to the Catalina Island Marine Institute and Santa Clara University's School of Engineering Maker Lab. Students also participate in various lecture series, lab tours, workshops, and documentary screenings throughout the year. Additionally, Clare Boothe Luce members lead an annual STEM workshop for middle school students in the region, exploring the areas of environmental science, engineering, coding, robotics, biology, and chemistry.

== Student life ==
In the 2014–15 school year, two-thirds of the student body was day students from throughout Ventura County. There were 90 boarding students representing several countries, primarily in Asia.

A major tradition at Villanova Prep is Wildcat Day, a daylong intramural competition. Held annually since around the late 1970s, the event consists of several "tribes" contesting a series of physical challenges. The exercise is intended to instill in every student the school's core values of "truth, community, and love" while developing the leadership skills of seniors who lead each tribe.

== Athletics ==
Villanova Preparatory School athletic teams are nicknamed the Wildcats. The school is a member of the CIF Southern Section (CIF-SS) and competes in the Tri-County Athletic Association (TCAA).

The Villanova Prep baseball team won a CIF-SS championship in 1961 and the boys basketball team won a CIF-SS championship in 2022

Villanova Prep discontinued its football program in 1974, but in 2001 it was brought back in an eight-man format under head coach and athletic director John Muller. The school switched to the conventional 11-man version in 2004. In only its second year in 11-man, the team went undefeated during the 2005 season and made the CIF playoffs. Villanova Prep returned to eight-man play in 2013.

Villanova Prep defeated Chaffey High School 75-69 in overtime on February 25, 2022 to win its first-ever CIF-Southern Section Boys' Basketball Championship. Villanova Prep was the only Ventura County boys' basketball team to win a CIF-SS championship in 2022.

== Notable alumni ==
- Colman Andrews (1962), cofounder of Saveur magazine
- William P. Clark, Jr. (1949), California Supreme Court justice, National Security Advisor to Ronald Reagan (1982–1983), and Secretary of the Interior (1983–1985)
- John Gavin (1948), actor, president of the Screen Actors Guild, and United States ambassador to Mexico
- Michael G. Wilson (1956) screenwriter and film producer
- Steve Hovley (1963), Major League Baseball player, Seattle Pilots/Milwaukee Brewers, Oakland Athletics, Kansas City Royals
- John Fuller (1980), CEO, Wahlburgers
- Tara Hernandez (1986), software developer and open source contributor in Silicon Valley

== Notable faculty ==
- Parry Shen, drama teacher and dormitory staffer; actor, Better Luck Tomorrow

== Controversy ==
In 1998, James Woodstock, a 31-year-old religion and morality teacher, was convicted of statutory rape after impregnating a 16-year-old student.

In early 2006, it was discovered that the headmaster had hired a Latin teacher, Shannon McCreery, who had been convicted of second degree murder for assisting in his father's suicide in 1996. Though the headmaster was aware of the conviction, he did not disclose this information to the school's board of directors nor the rest of the staff. Fallout from the incident included McCreery's dismissal and an attempt to oust the headmaster.
