= Laun (disambiguation) =

Laun is the German spelling of Louny in the Czech Republic. It may also refer to:

- Alfred A. Laun Jr. (1905–1964), American politician
- Friedrich Laun (1770–1849), pseudonym of Friedrich August Schulze, German novelist
- Henri van Laun (1820–1896), Dutch writer, translator and teacher
- Nikolaus von Laun (c. 1300 – 1371), German friar and scholar
