= Order of Saint Augustine =

Catholic order of mendicant friars

- Ordo Sancti Augustini
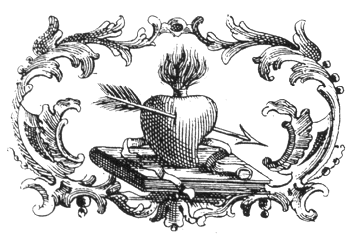
- Abbreviation: OSA
- Formation: 1 March 1244; 782 years ago, though has predating history
- Type: Mendicant religious order of the Catholic Church
- Headquarters: Basilica of Saint Augustine in Campus Martius
- Location: Augustinian General Curia, Via Paolo VI, 25, 00193 Rome, Italy
- Coordinates: 41°54′3″N 12°27′28″E
- Region served: 50 countries in Africa, Americas, Asia, Europe and Oceania
- Members: 2,457 friars (1,804 are priests) As of 2022
- Motto: Latin: Anima una et cor unum in Deum; English: One mind and one heart intent upon God
- Prior General: Very Rev. Fr. Joseph Farrell, OSA
- Website: augustinianorder.org
- Formerly called: Order of Hermits of Saint Augustine

The Order of Saint Augustine (Latin: Ordo Fratrum Sancti Augustini), abbreviated OSA, is a mendicant religious order of the Catholic Church. It was founded in 1244 by bringing together several eremitical groups in the Tuscany region who were following the Rule of Saint Augustine, written by Augustine of Hippo in the fifth century.

They are also commonly known as the Augustinians, Austin friars, or Friars Hermits and, until 1968, as the Order of Hermits of Saint Augustine (Latin: Ordo eremitarum sancti Augustini; abbreviated OESA).

The order has, in particular, spread internationally the veneration of the Virgin Mary under the title of Our Lady of Good Counsel (Mater boni consilii).

In the 2025 papal conclave, Leo XIV was elected as the first pope from the Order of Saint Augustine.

== Background ==
Augustinian friars believe that Augustine of Hippo, first with some friends and afterward as bishop with his clergy, led a monastic community life. Regarding the use of property or possessions, Augustine did not make a virtue of poverty, but of sharing. Their manner of life led others to imitate them. Instructions for their guidance were found in several writings of Augustine, especially in De opere monachorum, mentioned in ancient codices of the eighth or ninth century as the "Rule of St. Augustine". Between 430 and 570 this lifestyle was carried to Europe by monks and clergy fleeing the persecution of the Vandals, although various forms of asceticism were already present in Europe by that time. In the thirteenth century, the various eremitical groups that composed the Augustinian Hermits faced the threat of suppression by the papacy based on their lack of antiquity. To overcome this, the friars forged a historical connection to Augustine, and made an especial point to demonstrate that they received the Rule directly from Augustine himself. The Augustinian rule was in use by a wide range of groups across early and high medieval Europe, and there is no historical evidence that the Augustinian Friars were in any way founded by Augustine himself. Rather, the friars invented these links after the Order was threatened with suppression in 1274 at the Second Council of Lyons.

While in early Medieval times the rule was overshadowed by other Rules, particularly that of St. Benedict, this system of life for cathedral clergy continued in various locations throughout Europe for centuries, and they became known as Canons regular (i.e. cathedral clergy living in community according to a rule). Augustine's Rule appears again in practice in the eleventh century as a basis for the reform of monasteries and cathedral chapters.

== History ==
Around the start of the 13th century, many eremitical communities, especially in the vicinity of Siena, Italy, sprang up. These were often small (no more than ten) and composed of laymen. Their foundational spirit was one of solitude and penance. At this time there were a number of eremitical groups living in such diverse places as Tuscany, Latium, Umbria, Liguria, England, Switzerland, Germany, and France. In 1223 four of the communities around Siena joined in a loose association, which had increased to thirteen within five years.

=== Little Union ===
The Augustinian friars came into being as part of the mendicant movement of the 13th century, a new form of religious life which sought to bring the religious ideals of the monastic life into an urban setting which allowed the religious to serve the needs of the people in an apostolic capacity. In 1243 the Tuscan hermits petitioned Pope Innocent IV to unite them all as one group. Innocent IV issued the bull Incumbit Nobis on 16 December 1243, an essentially pastoral letter which exhorted these hermits to adopt "the Rule and way of life of the Blessed Augustine," and to elect a prior general. The bull also appointed Cardinal Riccardo Annibaldi as their supervisor and legal guide.

=== Grand Union ===
On 15 July 1255, Pope Alexander IV issued the bull Cum quaedam salubria to command a number of religious groupings to gather for the purpose of being amalgamated into a new Order of Hermits of Saint Augustine. Those summoned included the Williamites; several unspecified houses of the Order of St. Augustine, established chiefly in Italy, including those in Tuscany, with Cardinal Annibaldi as protector; the Bonites, so called from their founder, Blessed John Buoni, a member of the Buonuomini family, and named after bishop John the Good; and the Brittinians (Brictinians), so called from their oldest foundation near Fano, in the Marche district of Ancona.

The delegates met in Rome on 1 March 1256, which resulted in a union. Lanfranc Septala of Milan, Prior of the Bonites, was appointed the first prior general of the newly constituted Order.

=== Expansion ===
At the time of the Grand Union of 1256, some of the constituent congregations already had houses established north of the Alps. The Williamites had already expanded into Hungary. The Hermits of St. Augustine spread rapidly, partly because they did not radiate from a single parent monastery, and partly because, after conflicts in the previously existing congregations, the active life was finally adopted by the greater number of communities, following the example of the Friars Minor and the Dominicans. A few years after the reorganization of the Augustinian Order, Hermit monasteries sprang up in Germany, and Spain. Foundations were made in Mainz (1260), Zurich (1270), and Munich (1294). The first Augustinian houses in France were in the area of Provence. In 1274 the Fratres Saccati were dissolved and the Augustinians were given a number of their houses. By 1275 there were about a half dozen friaries stretching in a line along the southern coast. Eventually, France had four Augustinian provinces. The presence of the Augustinian Order can be dated securely in Venetian Candia to the early fourteenth century when they rebuilt the convent of San Salvatore in Heraklion. At the period of its greatest prosperity the order comprised 42 ecclesiastical provinces and two vicariates numbering two thousand monasteries and about 30,000 members.

The Augustinian Friars were brought to Ciechanów (Poland) in 1358 by Duke Siemowit III. They experienced the most turbulent times during the Reformation. From the 17th century, the Augustinians' pastoral presence was growing in the towns. The monastery – characterised by mild observance – was usually inhabited by 4 to 7 monks. It ceased to exist in 1864 when monasteries were dissolved.

Many European Augustinian priories and foundations suffered serious setbacks (including suppression and destruction) from the various periods of anti-clericalism during the Reformation and other historical events. After the First World War, economic conditions were such in Germany that friars were sent to North America to teach. After 1936, with the political situation in Nazi Germany worsening, more German Augustinians departed for North America, where a separate German province had been established.

=== Privileges of the order ===
Pope Alexander IV freed the order from the jurisdiction of the bishops; Pope Pius V placed the Augustinians among the mendicant orders and ranked them fourth after the Carmelites. Since the end of the 13th century the sacristan of the Papal Palace was always to be an Augustinian friar. This privilege was ratified by Pope Alexander VI and granted to the Order forever by a bull issued in 1497. The holder of the office was Rector of the Vatican parish (of which the chapel of St. Paul is the parish church). To his office also belonged the duty of preserving in his oratory a consecrated Host, which had to be renewed weekly and kept in readiness in case of the pope's illness, when it was the privilege of the papal sacristan to administer the last sacraments to the pope. The sacristan had always to accompany the pope when he traveled, and during a conclave it was he who celebrated Mass and administered the sacraments. As of 2009, Augustinian friars still perform the duties of papal sacristans, but the appointment of an Augustinian as bishop-sacristan lapsed under Pope John Paul II with the retirement of Petrus Canisius Van Lierde in 1991. In papal Rome the Augustinian friars always filled one of the Chairs of the Sapienza University, and one of the consultorships in the Congregation of Rites.

In 1331 Pope John XXII appointed the Augustinian Hermits guardians of the tomb of St. Augustine in the Church of San Pietro in Ciel d'Oro at Pavia. They were driven from there in 1700, and evacuated to Milan. Their priory was destroyed in 1799, the church desecrated, and the remains of Augustine were taken back to Pavia and placed in its cathedral. The church of S. Pietro was restored, and on 7 October 1900, the body of the saint and Doctor of the church was removed from the cathedral and replaced in San Pietro. The Augustinians were subsequently restored their old church of S. Pietro.

=== Reform movements ===
In the fourteenth century, owing to various causes such as the mitigation of the rule—either by permission of the pope, or through a lessening of fervour, but chiefly because of the Plague and the Great Western Schism—discipline became relaxed in the Augustinian monasteries; and so reformers emerged who were anxious to restore it. These reformers were themselves Augustinians and instituted several reformed groups. The new governmental groupings were called "congregations" to distinguish them from the already-established geographical provinces. Each had its own vicar-general (vicarius-generalis), but he was under the control of the general of the order. In one country there could be two types of Augustinian houses, the conventual and the observants.

The most important of these congregations of the "Regular Observance" were those of Lecceto, near Siena, established in 1385 and initially had 12 houses. The Lombardy Congregation (1430) had 56. The reform of Monte Ortono near Padua (1436) had 5 convents, the Regular Observants of the Blessed Virgin at Genoa (also called Our Lady of Consolation (c. 1470) had 25. The Congregation of Santa Maria del Popolo in Rome was affiliated with Augustinians in Ireland.

Johannes Zachariae, an Augustinian monk of Eschwege, Provincial of the Order from 1419 to 1427 and professor of theology at the University of Erfurt, began a reform in 1492. The German, or Saxon, Reformed Congregation, recognized in 1493, comprised nearly all the important convents of the Augustinian Hermits in Germany. After the Reformation, German houses that remained in communion with Rome united with the Lombardic Congregation. There are no longer any officially designated observant houses or congregations in the Order of Saint Augustine in an official sense.

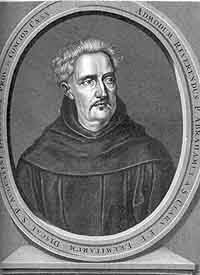
Abraham a Sancta Clara (1644–1709)

The Augustinian Recollects were formed in 1588 in Spain as a reform movement of the Order and have their own constitutions, differing from those of the other Augustinians.

The Discalced Augustinians developed in Italy in 1592 with the same goal. Currently, though, they are primarily found serving in pastoral care.

=== Missions ===
The value set upon learning and science by the Augustinian friars is demonstrated by the care given to their missionary work, their libraries, and by the historic establishment of their own printing press in their convent at Nuremberg (1479), as well as by the numerous learned individuals produced by the order.

==== Africa ====
The Augustinians followed the Portuguese flag in Africa and the Gulf behind the explorer and seafarer Vasco da Gama. Nikolaus von Laun (d. 1371), auxiliary bishop of Ratisbon, where he died, with some brethren preached the Gospel in Africa. He had sailed from Lisbon in 1497, and arrived at Mozambique in March 1498. Portuguese Augustinians also arrived in Gold coast (now Ghana) in 1572 and started their missionary work, and also worked on the island of Sao Tome, in Warri (Nigeria), and in what is now known as Angola, in the Congo, in Equatorial Guinea, and in Gabon up until 1738. The Portuguese also took control of the port of Goa in India—giving the Augustinians a foothold there also. Besides the early Portuguese Augustinians, other Augustinian missionaries have since followed to Africa from America, Ireland, Belgium and Australia.

As of 2006, there were more than 30 other Augustinian priories in Nigeria, Congo, Kenya, Tanzania, South Africa and Algeria, with over 85 friars. There are also Augustinians working in the Republic of Benin, Togo, Madagascar, Guinea and Burkina Faso.

==== Philippines ====
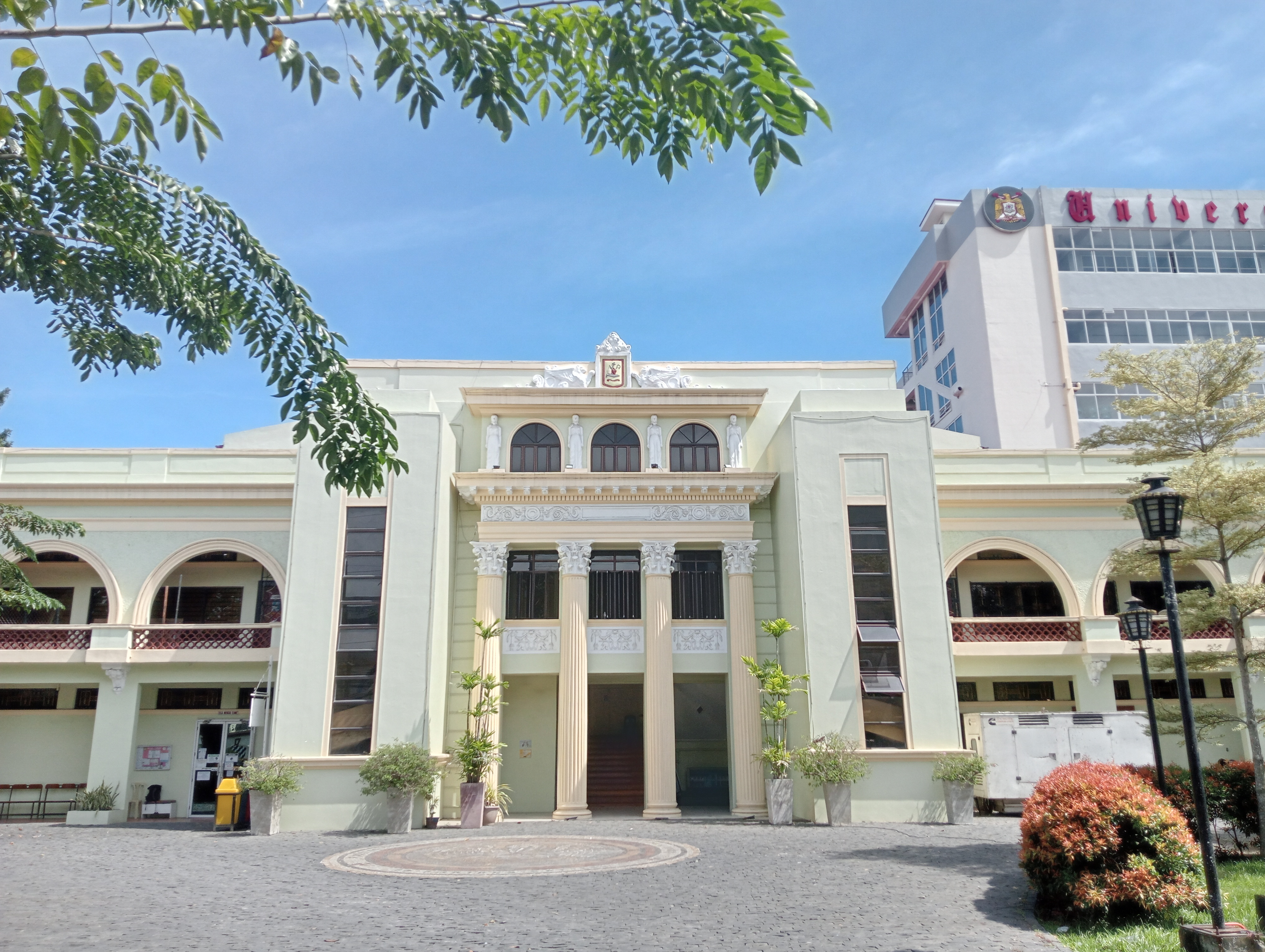
The University of San Agustin, in Iloilo City, Philippines. The oldest University run by the Order of Saint Augustine in Asia-Pacific.

The Order of Saint Augustine is the oldest of the four main Catholic Religious Orders: mainly the Augustinians, the Franciscans, the Jesuits, and the Augustinian Recollects; that participated in Missions to the Philippines, with the Augustinian Chaplain, Rev. Fr. Pedro de Valderrama, present in the year 1519 Magellan expedition and he witnessed the conversion of Cebu's Rajah from Hinduism to Christianity. The Augustinians founded and are the caretakers of the oldest stone church in the Philippines, the San Agustin Church (Manila), which survived despite the British Occupation of Manila, the Philippine Revolution against Spain, the Philippine-American War, and the Japanese Occupation of the Philippines. The Augustinians also baptized Agustin de Legazpi of Tondo from Islam to Christianity. The choice of Agustin as baptismal name alludes to Saint Augustine of Hippo a Christian North African saint from Algeria, back when Algeria was once Catholic before it was conquered by Sunni Muslims. Miguel López de Legazpi, Agustin de Legazpi's baptismal godfather was a fervent Christian who mourned the loss of North Africa from Christianity to Islam and sought to do the reverse in the Philippines. He advocated Augustinian Spirituality, wherein rather than being focused on fallen Old Jerusalem of the broken City of Man, one should focus on the heavenly New Jerusalem, and manifest it with your actions, in which case Old Jerusalem was the Christian lands in the Middle East and North Africa which fell to Islam, and Legazpi's New Jerusalem, being Muslim lands in the Philippines, Miguel López de Legazpi, conquers for Christianity. Andrés de Urdaneta, the Augustinian Chaplain of the Legazpi expedition, also discovered the return route from the Philippines to Mexico, which allowed for the further colonization and settlement of the Philippines by colonists and officials from Mexico and Spain. The Augustinian Friar, Rev. Fr. Tomas Santaren nevertheless recorded the history of the precolonial kingdom called the Kedatuan of Madja-as in his book entitled "Bisayan Accounts of Early Bornean Settlements" (created in 1858, published in 1902). Furthermore, the Augustinians are now caretakers of the oldest Catholic religious relic in the Philippines, the Santo Niño de Cebú. The Order of Saint Augustine also maintains the University of San Agustin in Iloilo City, the First Augustinian University in the Asia-Pacific.

==== Mexico ====
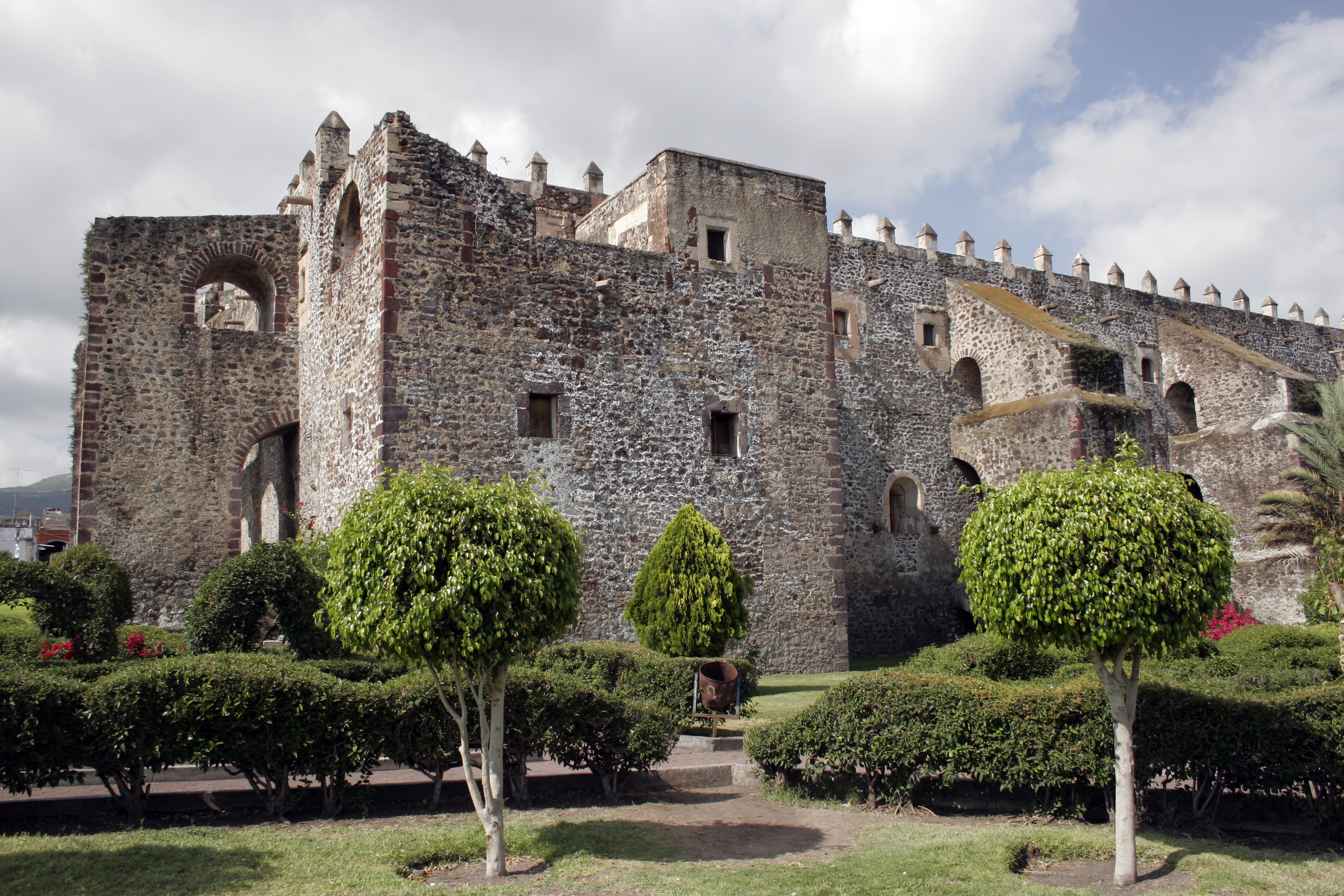
Monastery of San Agustin of Yuriria, Mexico, founded in 1550.

Sent by their Provincial Thomas of Villanova, the first group of Spanish/Castilian Augustinians arrived in Mexico in 1533 after the subjugation of Aztec Mexico by Hernán Cortés. They were later instrumental in establishing the Royal and Pontifical University of Mexico. By 1562 there were nearly 300 Spanish Augustinians in Mexico, and they had established some 50 priories. Their history in Mexico was not to be an easy one, given the civil strife of events like the Cristero War, periodic anti-clericalism and suppression of the church that was to follow.

==== Peru ====
Spanish Augustinians first went to Peru in 1551. From there they went to Ecuador in 1573, and from Ecuador in 1575 to Argentina, Bolivia, Chile, Colombia, Panama and Venezuela. The order founded the Ecuadorean University of Quito in 1586. Augustinians also entered Argentina via Chile between 1617 and 1626. Political events in these countries prevented the order from prospering and hindered the success of its undertakings. The order had considerable property confiscated by the Argentinian government under the secularisation laws in the 19th century, and were entirely suppressed for 24 years until 1901 when they returned. In the Prefecture Apostolic of San León de Amazonas, in June 1904, Bernardo Calle, the lay brother Miguel Vilajoli, and more than 70 Christians were murdered at a then recently erected mission station, Huabico, in Upper Maranon and the station itself was destroyed. The Augustinian Province of the Netherlands later also founded houses in Bolivia from 1930.

On 3 November 2014, Pope Francis appointed the American bishop and former General of the Order of St. Augustine Robert Prevost as apostolic administrator of the Diocese of Chiclayo in Peru and titular bishop of Sufar. Prevost received his episcopal consecration on 12 December 2014 at St. Mary's Cathedral in Chiclayo. On 26 September 2015, he was named bishop of Chiclayo, in September 2023 he was appointed cardinal by Pope Francis in Vatican City, and on 8 May 2025 became Pope Leo XIV.

==== Cuba ====
The order (from Mexico) arrived in Cuba in 1608. It was suppressed by force in 1842. From 1892 the province of the United States had care of St. Thomas of Villanova University at Havana, Cuba, where there were 5 priests and 3 lay brothers in 1900 before they were expelled in 1961 by the government of Fidel Castro.

In Central and South America, the Augustinians remain established as of 2000 in Argentina, Bolivia, Brazil, Chile, Colombia, Ecuador, Mexico, Panama, Venezuela, and Peru.

==== China ====
Martin de Hereda penetrated into the interior of China in 1577, to study Chinese literature with the intention of bringing it into Europe. Portuguese Augustinians served in the colonial port of Macau from 1586 until 1712.

In about 1681, the Filipino Augustinian Alvaro de Benevente arrived in China and established the first of the Augustinian houses in China at Kan-chou. Benevente was made bishop and became head of the newly created Vicariate of Kiang-si in 1699. The Augustinian missionaries had success in propagating Catholicism, but in 1708, during the Chinese Rites controversy they were forced to withdraw from China.

In 1879 Spanish Augustinians from Manila (Elias Suarez and Agostino Villanueva) entered China to re-establish an Augustinian mission. In 1900 the order possessed the mission of Northern Hunan, China. The mission comprised about 3000 baptized Christians and 3500 catechumens in a population of 11 million.

By 1947 the Augustinian mission counted 24,332 baptised Catholics as well as 3,250 preparing for baptism. They had established 20 major churches and 90 satellite churches. All foreign missionaries were expelled or imprisoned from 1953 by the Communist government. Chinese-born Augustinians were dispersed by government order and directed not to live the monastic life. Church officials were arrested, schools and other church institutions closed or confiscated by the State. Many priests, religious brothers and sisters, as well as leaders among the Christian laity were sent to labour camps.

Since the re-unification of the former colonies of Macau and Hong-Kong with the central Chinese government and further developments in government religious policy, Catholicism in China—including clergy, Catholic bishops, and a Cardinal—once again exists openly alongside the members of the Chinese Patriotic Catholic Association and their co-religionists in the continuing underground church.

The Augustinian have recently re-established friendly relations with Chinese educational organisations through school-placement programmes as well as through the University of the Incarnate Word Chinese campus founded by the Sisters of Charity of the Incarnate Word. While there are Chinese Augustinian friars, there is not yet a priory in mainland China re-established.

==== India ====
After an extensive period of expansion in India from the 15th century the Portuguese Augustinians had not only established the order but also provided sixteen Indian bishops between 1579 and 1840. The order subsequently disappeared in India, cut off from its usual governance after the suppression of Portuguese monasteries in 1838, and the friars were forced to become secular priests. The order had failed successfully to establish an autonomous indigenous Indian foundation.

However, the Augustinians were re-established by Andrés G. Niño, Spanish Augustinian, named coordinator of the project by the General Chapter of the Order in 1971 .... (cf., Estudio Agustiniano, 45 (2010) 279–303) ....... and the Indian Augustinians took on further responsibilities in Kerala in 2005. The Indian delegation currently has 16 ordained friars and 8 in simple vows. The order is growing numerically in India.

==== Iran ====
Towards the close of the sixteenth century, Aleixo de Menezes, Count of Cantanheda (d. 1617), a member of the order, appointed Archbishop of Goa in 1595, and of Braga in 1612, Primate of the East Indies, and several times Viceroy of India, sent several Augustinians as missionaries to Iran (Persia) while he himself laboured for the reunion of the Thomas Christians, especially at the Synod of Diamper, in 1599, and for the conversion of the Muslims and the non-Christians of Malabar.

==== Japan ====
The Augustinian missions in the Philippines provided missionaries for the East since their first establishment. In 1602 some of them penetrated into Japan, where several were martyred during a period of Christian persecution. Among those martyred, Augustinians include: Ferdinand of Saint Joseph, Andrew Yoshida, and Peter Zuñiga. Augustinian Ferdinand of Saint Joseph, along with Andrew Yoshida, a catechist who worked with him, were beheaded in 1617. In 1653 others entered China, where, in 1701, the order had six missionary stations before their expulsion.

Despite a vigorous early Christian foundation in Nagasaki by Jesuits, Franciscans and Filipino Augustinians and the many 17th century Japanese Augustinian martyrs, the earlier Augustinian mission attempts eventually failed after the repression of Tokugawa Hidetada (ruled 1605–1623; second Tokugawa shogun of Japan) and the expulsion of Christians under Tokugawa Iemitsu (ruled 1623 to 1651; third Tokugawa shogun of Japan).

However, American Augustinian friars returned to Japan in 1954, establishing their first priory in 1959 at Nagasaki. They then established priories in Fukuoka (1959), Nagoya (1964), and Tokyo (1968). As of 2006, there are seven American Augustinian friars and five Japanese Augustinian friars in Japan.

==== Oceania ====
By the early 20th century, the Augustinians established missions in Oceania. The Spanish Augustinians took over the missions founded by Spanish and German Jesuits in the Ladrones, which then numbered 7 stations with about 10,000 people on Guam, and about 2500 on each of the German islands of Saipan, Rota and Tinian. The mission on the German islands was separated from the Diocese of Cebú on 1 October 1906, and made a prefecture Apostolic on 18 June 1907, with Saipan as its seat of administration, and the mission given in charge to the German Capuchins.

==== Papua ====
The Augustinian Delegation of Papua has operated since 1953. It presently contains five Dutch-born Augustinians and thirty-three Indonesian-born Augustinians. The order of friars and affiliated orders are growing in the Indonesian territories.

==== Indonesia ====
Two Dutch Augustinian friars re-established the order in Dutch New Guinea (now the Papua region of Indonesia) in 1953. In 1956, the order took responsibility for the area that was to become the Diocese of Manokwari. As of 2006, the Augustinian Vicariate of Indonesia has 15 friars in solemn profession, and 7 in simple vows. It is now predominantly Papuan. The order of friars and affiliated orders are growing in Indonesia.

==== Korea ====
The Region of Korea was founded in 1985 by Australian, English and Scottish friars. Filipinos later replaced the UK friars. In 1985 it became the Delegation of Korea, with members working in the Dioceses of Incheon and Ui-Jeong-Bu.

== Present day ==
Members of the Order minister in over 50 countries. Current Catholic church head Pope Leo XIV is a member of the Order. He is also the first member of this friar-based Augustinian order to become pope.

=== Government ===
The Order of St Augustine, which follows the Rule of St. Augustine, is also governed by its Constitutions, first drawn up by prior general Augustinus Novellus in 1298. The Constitutions have been periodically updated and revised.

At the head is the prior general. Currently, the prior general is Joseph Farrell, who was elected in September 2025. The prior general is elected every six years by the general chapter. The prior general is aided by six assistants and a secretary, also elected by the general chapter. These form the Curia Generalitia. Each province is governed by a provincial, each commissariate by a commissary general, each of the two congregations by a vicar-general, and every monastery by a prior (only the Czech monastery of Alt-Brunn, in Moravia, is under an abbot) and every college by a rector. The members of the order are divided into priests and brothers. The Augustinians, like most religious orders, have a cardinal protector.

The chief house of the order remains the International College of St. Monica at Rome, Via S. Uffizio No. 1. It is also the residence of the general of the order (prior generalis) and of the curia generalis.

=== The habit ===
The choir and outdoor dress of the friars is of black woollen material, with long, wide sleeves, a black leather cincture and a long pointed capuche reaching to the cincture. The indoor dress consists of a black habit with capuche and cincture. In many Augustinian houses white is used in summer and also worn in public, usually in places where there were no Dominicans. Shoes in and out of doors (prior to Vatican II) a black hat or biretta completed the habit.

The Order of Saint Augustine holds the status of an NGO (Non-Governmental Organisation) with the United Nations. The Holy See Observer requested that the representatives of the order aid the work of the Holy See in studying the drafts of documents that the United Nations publishes on the occasion of major World Summits.

=== Priories ===
As of 2006 there were 148 active Augustinian priories in Europe, including Germany, The Netherlands, Belgium, Poland, Ireland, England, the Czech Republic, Austria, Italy, Malta, Portugal, and Spain. This includes 1,031 friars in solemn vows, and 76 in simple vows. As of 2021, the German Province had eleven priories, and about 110 members. Worldwide there are nearly 2,800 Augustinian friars working in:

- Algeria
- Argentina
- Australia
- Austria
- Belgium
- Benin
- Bolivia
- Brazil
- Canada
- Chile
- China
- Colombia
- Dem. Rep. Congo
- Costa Rica
- Cuba
- Czech Republic
- Dominican Republic
- Ecuador
- India
- Indonesia
- Italy
- Japan
- Kenya
- Malta
- Mexico
- Netherlands
- Nicaragua
- Nigeria
- Panama
- Papua
- Peru
- Philippines
- Poland
- Portugal
- Puerto Rico
- Slovakia
- South Africa
- South Korea
- Spain
- Taiwan
- Tanzania
- Thailand
- Togo
- United States
- Uruguay
- Vatican City
- Venezuela
- Vietnam

The Augustinian Secondary Education Association (ASEA) is an organization founded in 1986 to "foster unity, efficiency, and continued development within the Augustinian ministry to secondary education" in North America. It operates without a budget, acting as a forum for member institutions to share resources, implement Augustinian ideals in the curriculum of its institutions, and to ensure that its member institutions present an "authentic Augustinian identity".

== Provinces ==
=== Australasia ===
==== Province of Our Mother of Good Counsel ====
In 1838, James Alipius Goold became the first Augustinian to arrive in the Australian colonies. Goold began his missionary work in Sydney under Archbishop John Bede Polding, becoming parish priest at Campbelltown. He went on in 1848 to become the founding bishop and first Archbishop of the Archdiocese of Melbourne. The first Australian priory was founded by Irish Augustinian friars at Echuca, Victoria, in 1886. Priories were established at Rochester in 1889 and Kyabram in 1903. Matthew Downing tried to calm the miners who were part of the Eureka Stockade in 1854.

The order presently serves in parishes, at St Augustine's College (New South Wales) and Villanova College, Brisbane. They have a special ministry to the Aboriginal community, and work with migrants and refugees in Thailand. They are also training a few Vietnamese Augustinians to serve in their own country. They also sponsor Augustine Volunteers Australia (AVA). As of 2021 there were 7 Augustinian priories in Australia.

=== Canada ===
==== Province of St. Joseph ====
The order established the first of their Canadian houses at Tracadie, Nova Scotia, in Canada in 1938. It was founded by German Augustinians who had previously emigrated to the US. Among other Canadian foundations, the order also established Marylake Shrine of Our Lady of Grace and St. Thomas of Villanova College in King City, Ontario, near Toronto. The college was founded in 1999 in cooperation with the Order of Saint Augustine's friars of Toronto and Marylake Augustinian Monastery. Augustinians continue to serve at Sacred Heart Parish in both King City, Ontario and Delta, British Columbia.

=== England and Scotland ===
==== Province of St. John Stone ====
In 1248 Richard de Clare, 6th Earl of Gloucester invited the Augustinians in Normandy to open their first English friary at Clare in Suffolk. In England and Ireland of the 14th century the Augustinian order had had over 800 friars, but these priories had declined to around 300 friars before the anti-clerical laws of the Reformation Parliament and the Act of Supremacy. The friaries were dispersed from 1538 in the dissolution of monasteries during the English Reformation. A partial List of monasteries dissolved by Henry VIII of England includes a number of Augustinian houses, including friaries at Leicester and Ludlow, in the Welsh Marches.

The Augustinians were re-established in England in the 1860s with the creation of the priory, school and Church of St Monica in Hoxton Square, London, N1 (architect: E. W. Pugin) built 1864–66.Clare Priory – one of the houses dissolved by King Henry VIII – was re-acquired by the order in 1953, with help from the family who then owned it.

=== Ireland ===
==== Province of Our Lady, Mother of Good Counsel ====
The English Province of the friars founded their first house in Dublin some time around 1280. Dungarvan followed in 1290. For a considerable time the Augustinians of Ireland were all English, effectively serving the English settlers in Ireland. The Irish branch was relatively poor, but the fortunes of the Irish order changed in 1361 when Lionel of Antwerp, 1st Duke of Clarence, became viceroy of Ireland. He favoured the order, and soon established an Augustinian professor of theology based at St. Patrick's Cathedral, Dublin, and the Irish order then grew significantly until the time of the English Reformation.

After the Reformation Parliament that began in 1529, the Augustinian houses in Leinster, Munster, Dublin, Dungarvan and Drogheda were soon suppressed. The houses in Ardnaree, Ballinrobe, Ballyhaunis, Banada and Murrisk managed to remain functioning until 1610. By decree in 1542 the English parliament had allowed the Augustinian community at Dunmore in County Galway, Ireland to continue. After 1610 the Dunmore community was the only surviving foundation, probably because Lord Bermingham's ancestors had founded the House.

In 1620 the Irish Province of the Augustinians was given pastoral charge of both England (where all houses had been forcibly closed) and Ireland. Around 1641, the order received permission to occupy monasteries of the Canons Regular, who were no longer in Ireland. Irish Augustinian students were sent to the Continent to study, and the Irish Augustinians continued their work in Ireland under the Penal laws. A number were executed—including William Tirry. In 1656, in response to the persecution at home, Pope Alexander VII established the Irish Augustinians in Rome in the church and priory of San Matteo in Merulana. Many Augustinians though remained in Ireland. Others left to work in America and after the 1830s to Australia. After the Catholic Emancipation Act 1829, the order began to re-organise more openly in Ireland. The Irish friars took the order back to England, establishing a priory at Hoxton, London in 1864. They further turned their attention to Nigeria, Australia, America and missionary work. The contemporary Irish order conducts parishes, a school in Dungarvan (founded 1874), a school in New Ross (founded 1890) and special ministries in Ireland.

=== Philippines ===
==== Province of Santo Niño de Cebu ====
The Augustinian friars were the first Christian missionaries to settle in the Philippines. They were led by navigator and Augustine friar Andrés de Urdaneta who, with four other friars, arrived at Cebu in 1565. San Agustín Church and Monastery in Manila was established in 1571 and became the centre of Augustinian efforts to evangelize the Philippines. The Augustinian Province of the Most Holy Name of Jesus of the Philippines was officially formed on 31 December 1575.

In 1575, under the leadership of Alfonso Gutierez, twenty-four Spanish Augustinians landed in the islands and, with the respective provincials Diego de Herrera and Martin de Rada, worked very successfully, at first as wandering preachers. The Augustinian settlements in Brazil of the 19th century then belonged to the Philippine province.

The rise of Filipino nationalism stoked antipathy toward the Spanish clergy. During the Philippine Revolution of 1896, six Augustinian priests were killed and about 200 imprisoned. By the beginning of 1900, 46 Calced and 120 Discalced Augustinians had been imprisoned. Many Spanish Augustinians were forced to leave the country for Spain or Latin America, repopulating the Augustinian houses in Spain and reinforcing Augustinian missionary work in South America.

In 1904 members of the order belonging to the Philippine province established the University of San Agustin in Iloilo City, Philippines. In 1968 friars of the Philippine province re-established the Augustinian presence on the Indian subcontinent.

The presence of the province in the country was reduced to a Vicariate in 1926, the Augustinian Vicariate of the Philippines, and the provincial seat moved to Madrid. The province of the United States sent about sixty members to supply the vacancies in the Philippines. As the number of Filipino Augustinians increased, they requested the creation of a new Province. The Augustinian Province of Santo Niño de Cebu was canonically established on 25 December 1983. The Order in the 21st century still has responsibility for one of the oldest churches in the Philippines, the Basilica del Santo Niño de Cebu in Cebu. The Augustinian Recollects are also present in the Philippines.

As of 2006 (and not counting Spanish Augustinian priories) there were more than 21 other Augustinian houses across the Philippines, India, Korea, Japan, and Indonesia, with more than 140 friars.

=== Poland ===
The first Augustinian friars came to Poland in 1342, and settled at Kraków in southern Poland. They had been invited there from Bohemia by a Polish king, Kazimierz the Great. The Augustinian Friars were brought to Ciechanów in 1358 by Duke Siemowit III. Isaiah Boner was a delegate of the Polish community during some Provincial Chapters of the province of Bavaria. In 1438, he was elected a province inspector and in 1452 as vicar general assisted the prior general during the Provincial Chapter that was held in Ratisbon, Germany. One of the key moments for the Polish Augustinians in the sixteenth century happened on 31 December 1547. At that time the prior general, Jerome Seripando O.S.A., separated the Polish Augustinians from the province of Bavaria, which had suffered ill effects of the Protestant Reformation in Germany. The Polish Province was placed under the invocation of the Assumption of the Holy Virgin Mary.

=== Spain ===
==== Province of St. John of Sahagun ====
A significant Augustinian missionary college was established at the former Spanish capital of Valladolid in 1759—and this house was exempted from the suppression of monastic houses in Spain c.1835, later becoming the centre of restoration for the order in Spain. In 1885 Filipino Augustinians took charge of the famous Escorial, and friars continue to administer it today. The modern Augustinian province of Spain was refounded in 1926—largely through Spanish and Filipino friars from the Philippines. During the Spanish Civil War (1936–39) ninety eight Augustinians were murdered—sixty five friars from the Escorial alone were executed. As of 2006 there were 177 Spanish Augustinian friars, with 23 in simple profession.

In 2019 The Province of the Most Holy Name of Jesus of the Philippines of Spain was formally merged with three other Spanish Augustinian Provinces (Province of Castille, province of the Sacred Heart of Jesus of Matritense, and province of the Most Holy Name of Jesus of Spain) to create a unified Spanish Augustinian Province of St. John of Sahagun, a move which aims to restore the Augustinian Order in Spain, which has been in decline prior to the decision. As a consequence to the unification of these provinces, some of the province's circumscriptions or dependents have been elevated, like the Augustinian Vicariate of the Orient, which has been elevated as The Augustinian Province of the Philippines (a new, separate province from the province of Cebu).

=== United States ===
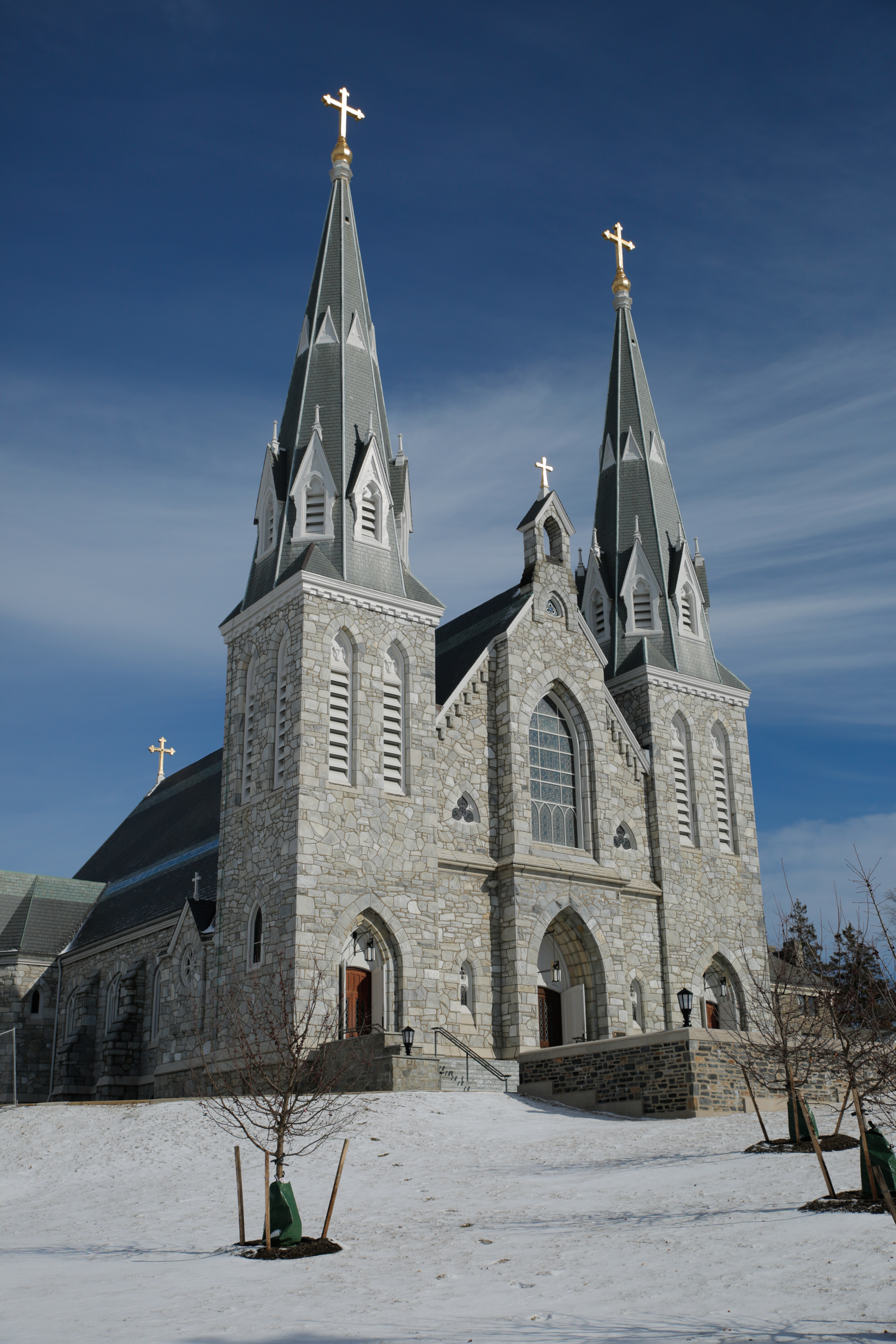
St. Thomas of Villanova Church, on the Villanova University campus.

==== Province of St. Thomas of Villanova ====
The North American foundation of the Order took place in 1796, when Irish friars arrived in Philadelphia, and founded Olde St. Augustine's Church in Philadelphia. Michael Hurley was the first American to join the Order, the following year. In May 1844 anti-Catholic rioters burned the Church of Saint Augustine to the ground, together with the friary.

The province increased in the end of the 19th century as the Augustinians were driven out of many European countries, and in 1848 sought refuge in the USA. The Province of St. Thomas of Villanova was established in 1874. The Novitiate of Our Mother of Good Counsel Priory in New Hamburg, New York was canonically established on 23 July 1925 on the 200 acre estate of Isaac Untermyer, known as Carnwath Farms Historic Site & Park. The location on the Hudson River was considered ideal for prayer, inner reflection, and vocational discernment. It remained in use for more than 50 years. But, as the number of men considering the religious declined, the Novitiate moved to New York City, then to Lawrence, Massachusetts, to Racine, Wisconsin, and to its current location at the intersection of Upper Gulph Road and County Line Road in Wayne, Pennsylvania in the former home of the Colleran Family.

When four Sisters of St Rita, a community aggregated to the Augustines, completed their missionary assignment in Bolivia, they found they could not return to Germany due to the impending outbreak of World War II. Instead, they went to the novitiate to work for the priests and seminarians. They later continued this ministry in Racine.

Villanova University in Pennsylvania was founded in 1842; Merrimack College in Massachusetts in 1947. The following high schools were also established: Malvern Preparatory School in Pennsylvania (1842); Augustinian Academy, Staten Island, NY (1899 – closed in 1969). Cascia Hall Preparatory School in Tulsa, Oklahoma (1926);Monsignor Bonner High School in Drexel Hill, Pennsylvania (1953); Archbishop John Carroll High School (1958), Washington, DC; St. Augustine College Preparatory School in Richland, New Jersey (1959); Austin Preparatory School in Reading, Massachusetts (1961).

As of 2014, the province had 174 professed members, living in 27 communities in the U.S., and 5 in Japan.

==== Province of Our Mother of Good Counsel ====
In 1905 James Edward Quigley, Archbishop of Chicago invited the Order to Chicago to start its first foundation west of the Appalachian Mountains. St. Rita of Cascia High School in Chicago was founded in 1909. Other parishes were then established, as well as Cascia Hall Preparatory School in Tulsa, Oklahoma in 1926 and Providence Catholic High Schoolin New Lenox, Illinois in 1962. In 1941, The Province of Our Mother of Good Counsel, also referred to as "Midwest Augustinians", was split off to cover the central U.S., leaving the east coast to the Villanova Province.

In 1962, Pope John XXIII asked for religious orders in the United States to send 10% of their members to evangelize Latin America. He later specifically invited the Augustinians of the Midwest Province of Our Mother of Good Counsel, headquartered near Chicago, to care for missionary territory in Northern Peru. The Augustinians accepted the invitation and began their missionary service in 1964. Their primary assignment was to the newly created Prelature of Chulucanas, which was later erected to become the Diocese of Chulucanas. The Augustinians also began new service in the nation's capital of Lima. Robert Prevost, later Pope Leo XIV, a friar of the province served as a missionary in Peru, he subsequently was named Prior Provincial, and then led the Order as Prior General, before returning to serve as a bishop in Peru.As of May 2016, the Midwest Province of Augustinians had 76 Augustinians.

==== Province of St. Augustine ====
In 1922, Bishop John Joseph Cantwell of the Diocese of Los Angeles and San Diego, asked the Order of Saint Augustine to establish a school for boys in the diocese. St. Augustine High School in San Diego, California (1922); followed by Villanova Preparatory School in Ojai, California (1925); and Cascia Hall Preparatory School in Tulsa, Oklahoma (1926). Members serve at three parishes, for schools and the Casa Hogar La Gloria Orphanage in Tijuana, Mexico.

== Saints, Blesseds, and other holy people ==
Popes

- Leo XIV (born 1955), First Augustinian Pope, second Pope from the Americas and first Pope born in the United States.

Saints

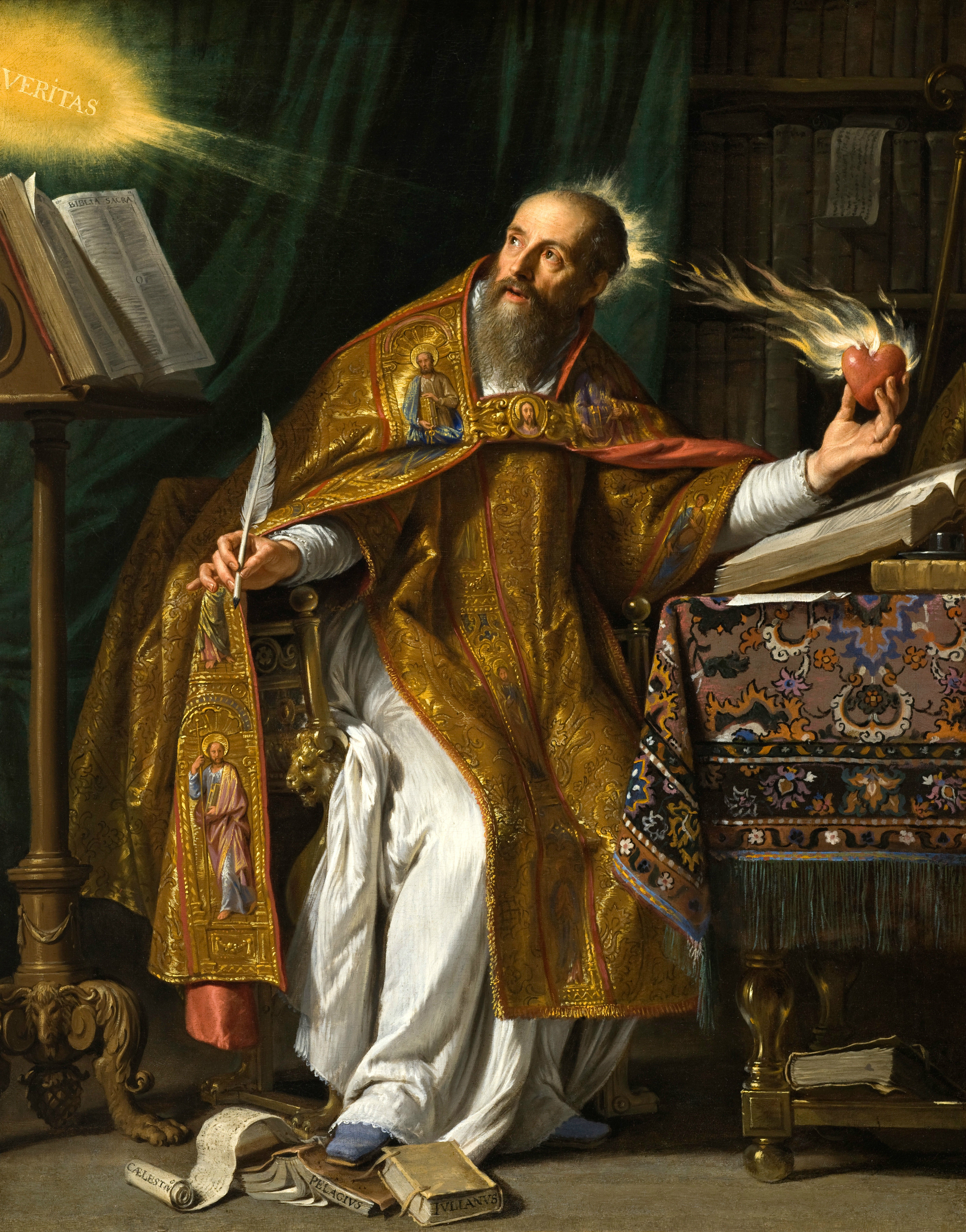
Augustine of Hippo

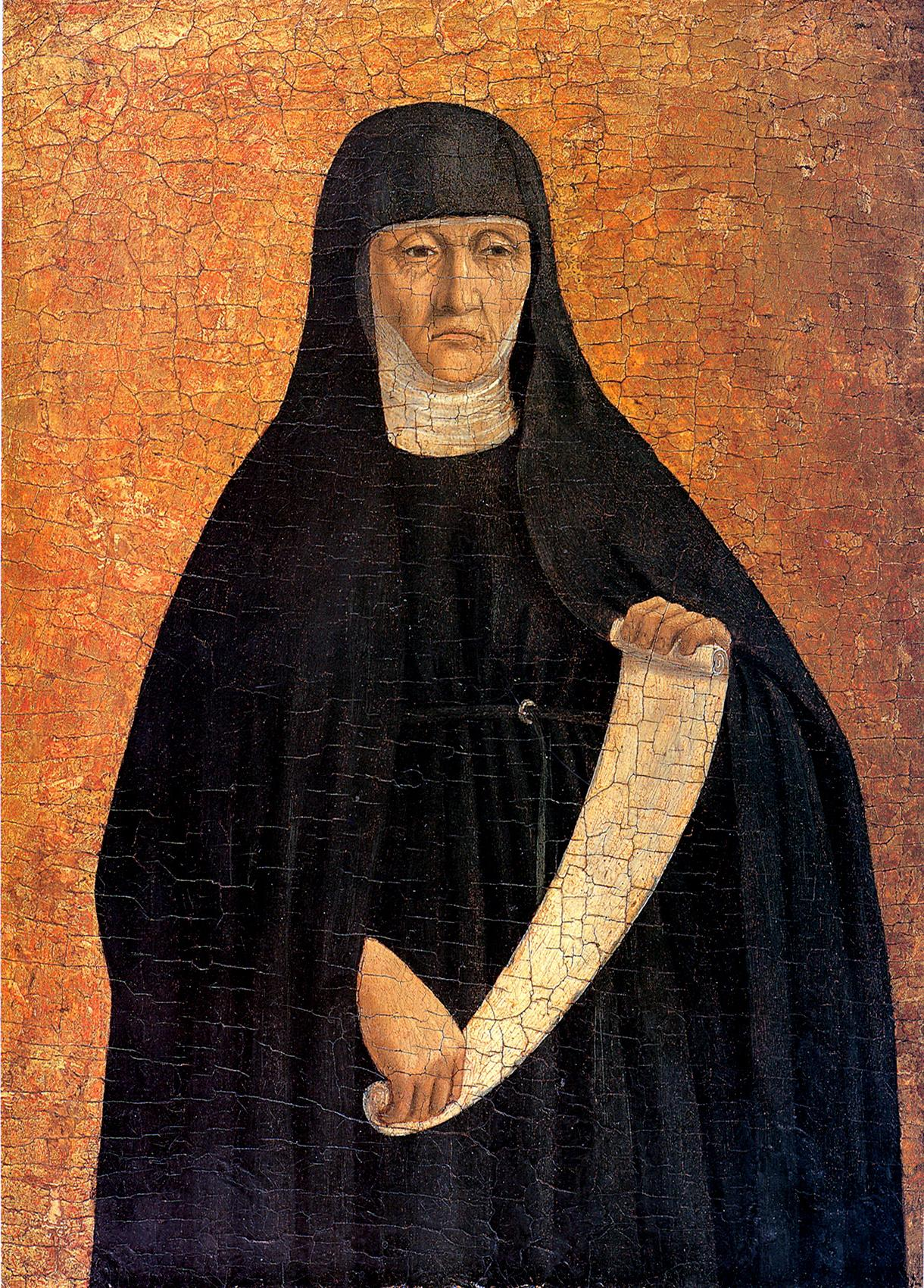
Monica

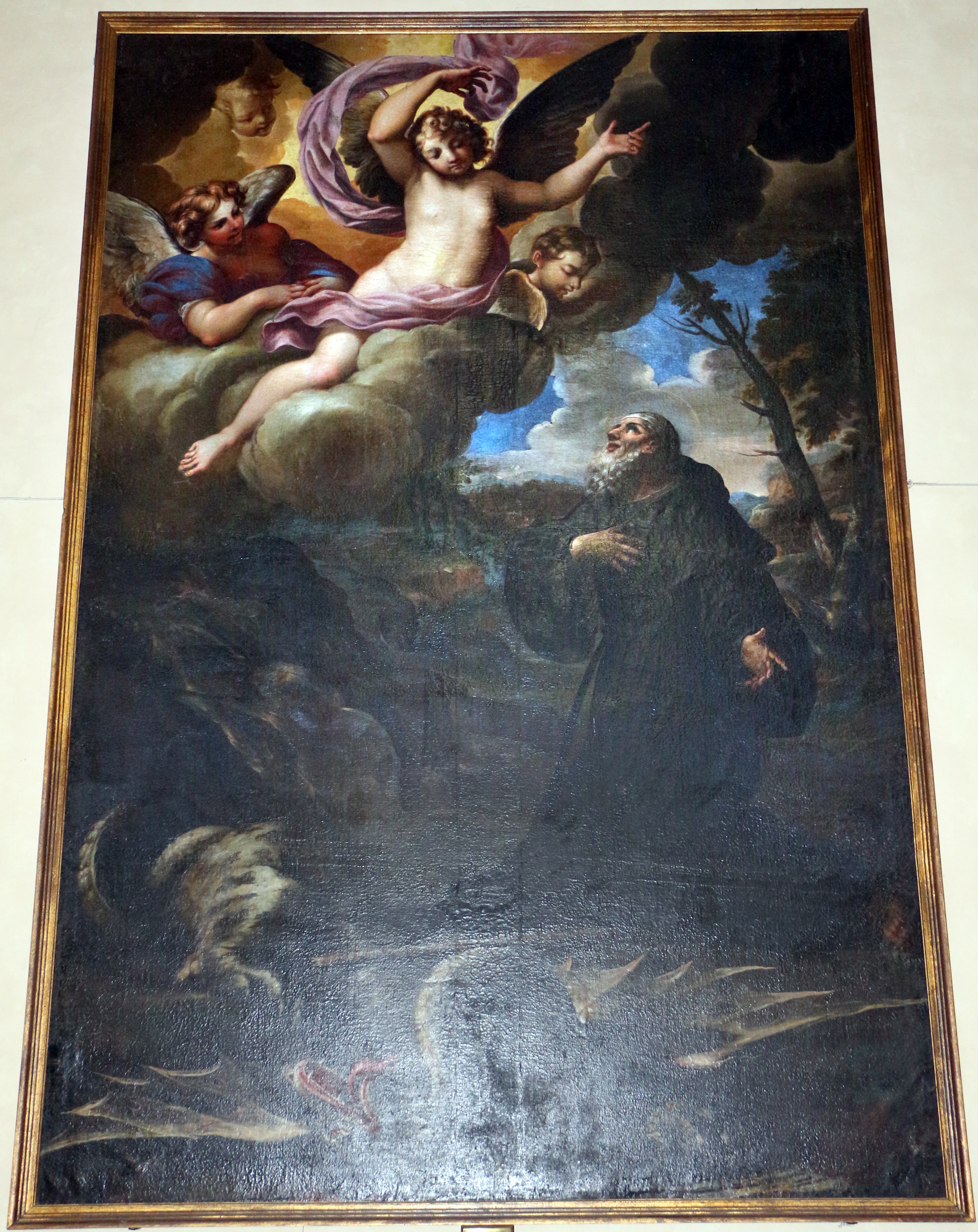
Guillaume de Maleval

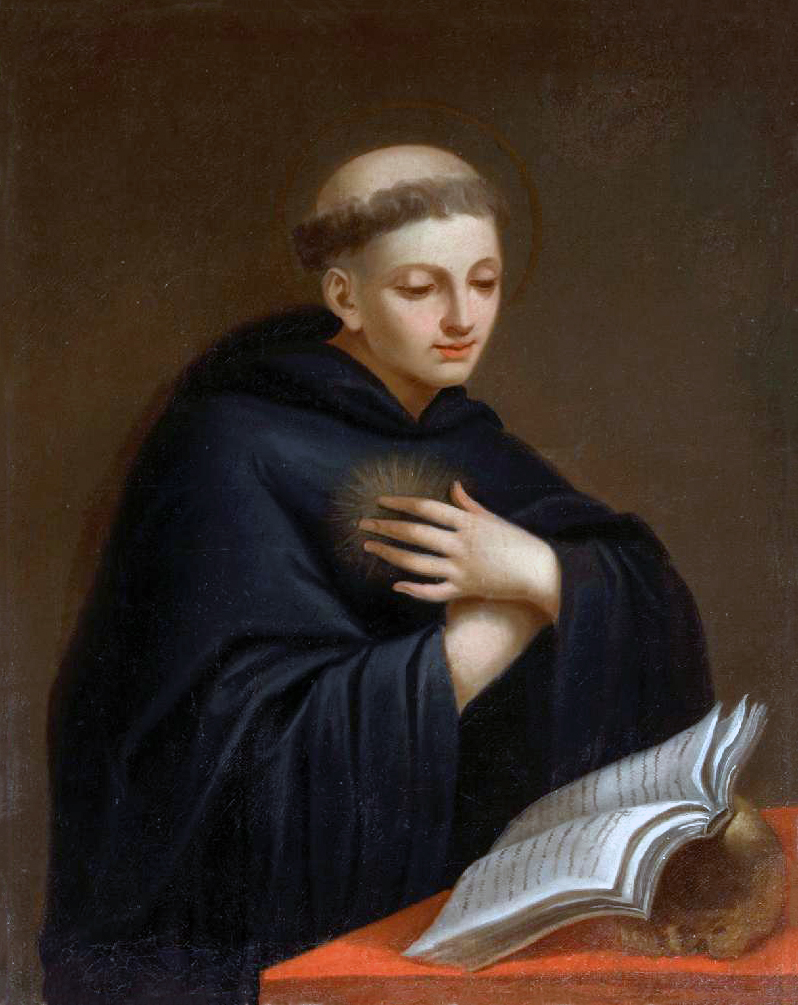
Nicolas de Tolentino

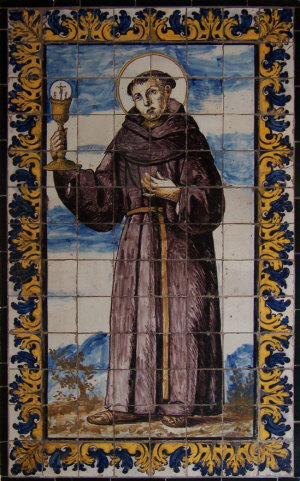
Juan de Sahagun

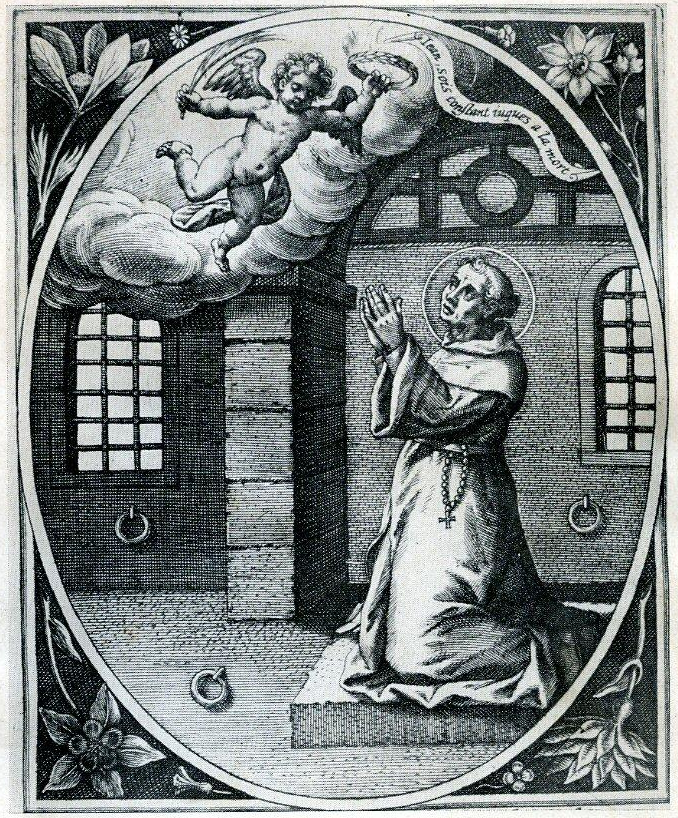
John Stone

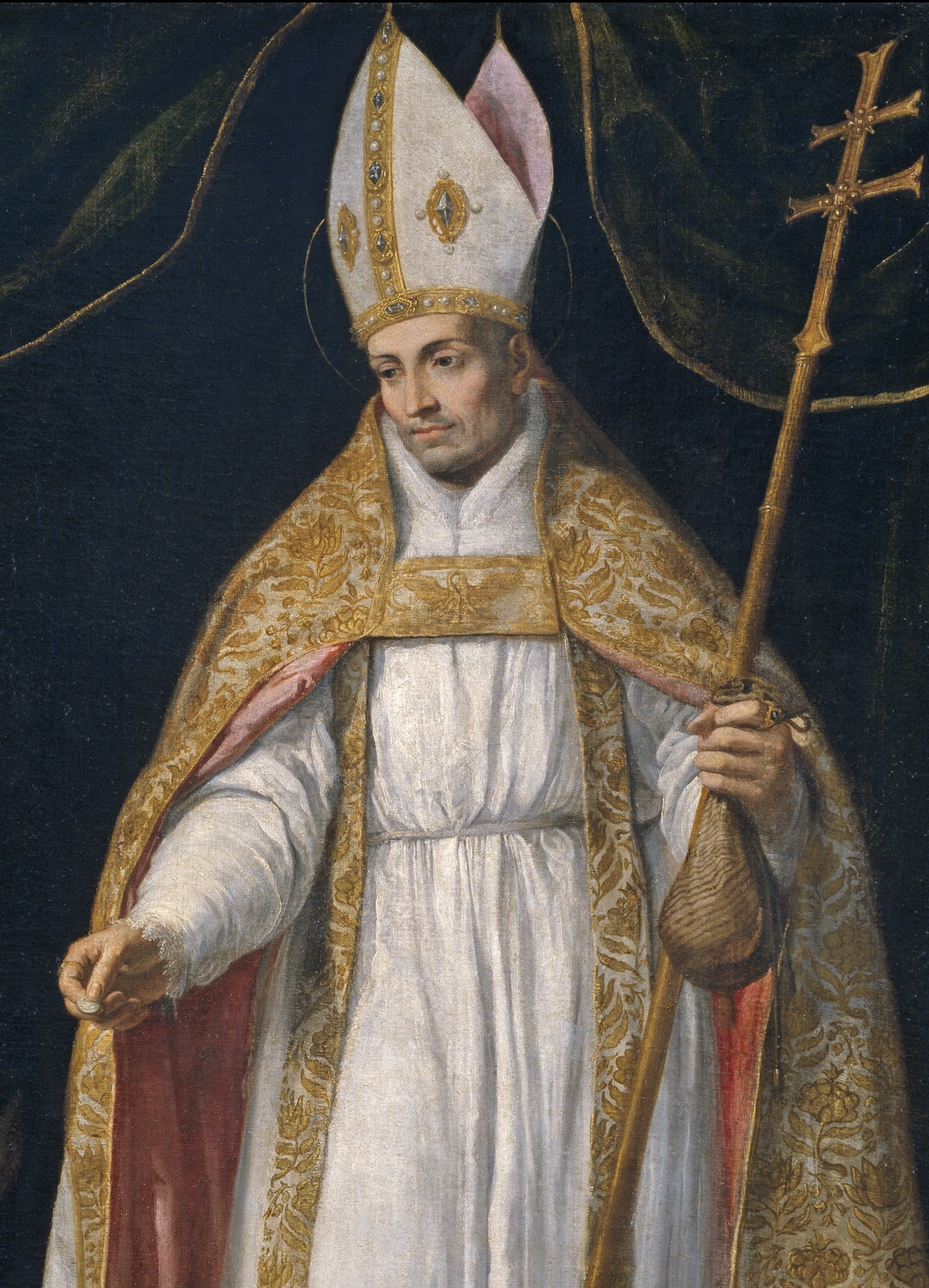
Tomas de Villanova

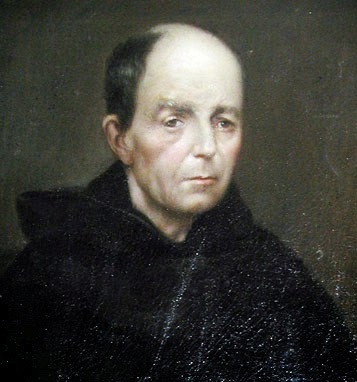
Alonso de Orozco Mena
- Monica of Hippo (c. 332 – c. 387), mother of Saint Augustine
- Augustine of Hippo (13 November 354 – 28 August 430), protector of the order, Bishop of Hippo, and Doctor of the Church
- Alypius of Thagaste (4th - 5th Century), friend of Saint Augustine and Bishop of Thagaste
- Gaudiosus of Naples (died c. 455) Bishop of Abitina, who introduced the Augustinian Rule into Naples
- Liberatus, Boniface, Servus, Rusticus, Rogatus, Septimus, and Maximus (died 484), martyrs of Gafsa, canonized on 6 June 1671
- Fulgentius of Ruspe (462 or 467 – 1 January 527 or 533), Bishop of Ruspe
- Agnello da Napoli (c. 535 – 14 December 596), abbot
- Odwulf of Evesham (died c. 855), missionary to the Frisians
- Guillaume de Maleval (died 10 February 1157), hermit, canonized on 8 May 1202
- Nicolas de Tolentino (c. 1246 – 10 September 1305), mystic, canonized on 5 June 1446
- Juan de Sahagun (c. 1430 – 11 June 1479), priest and peacemaker, canonized on 16 October 1690
- John Stone (died possibly 7 December 1539), martyr of the English Reformation, canonized on 25 October 1970
- Tomas de Villanova (1488 – 8 September 1555), Archbishop of Valencia, canonized on 1 November 1658
- Alonso de Orozco Mena (17 October 1500 – 19 September 1591), priest, canonized on 19 May 2002

Blesseds

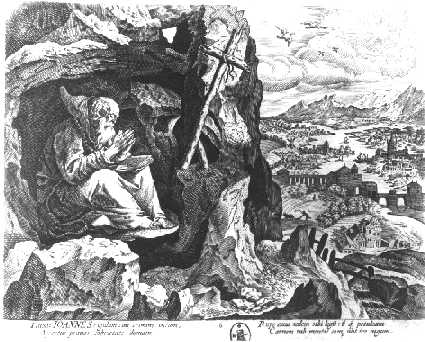
Giovanni Bono

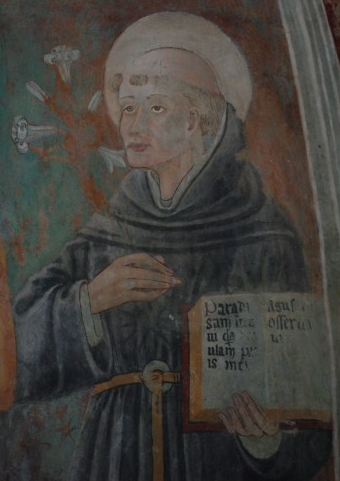
Ugolino da Gualdo Cattaneo

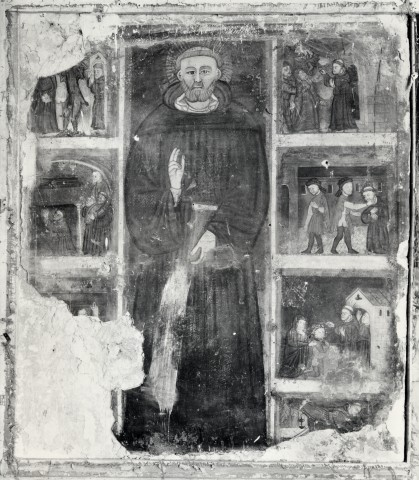
Angelo Scarpetti da Sansepolcro

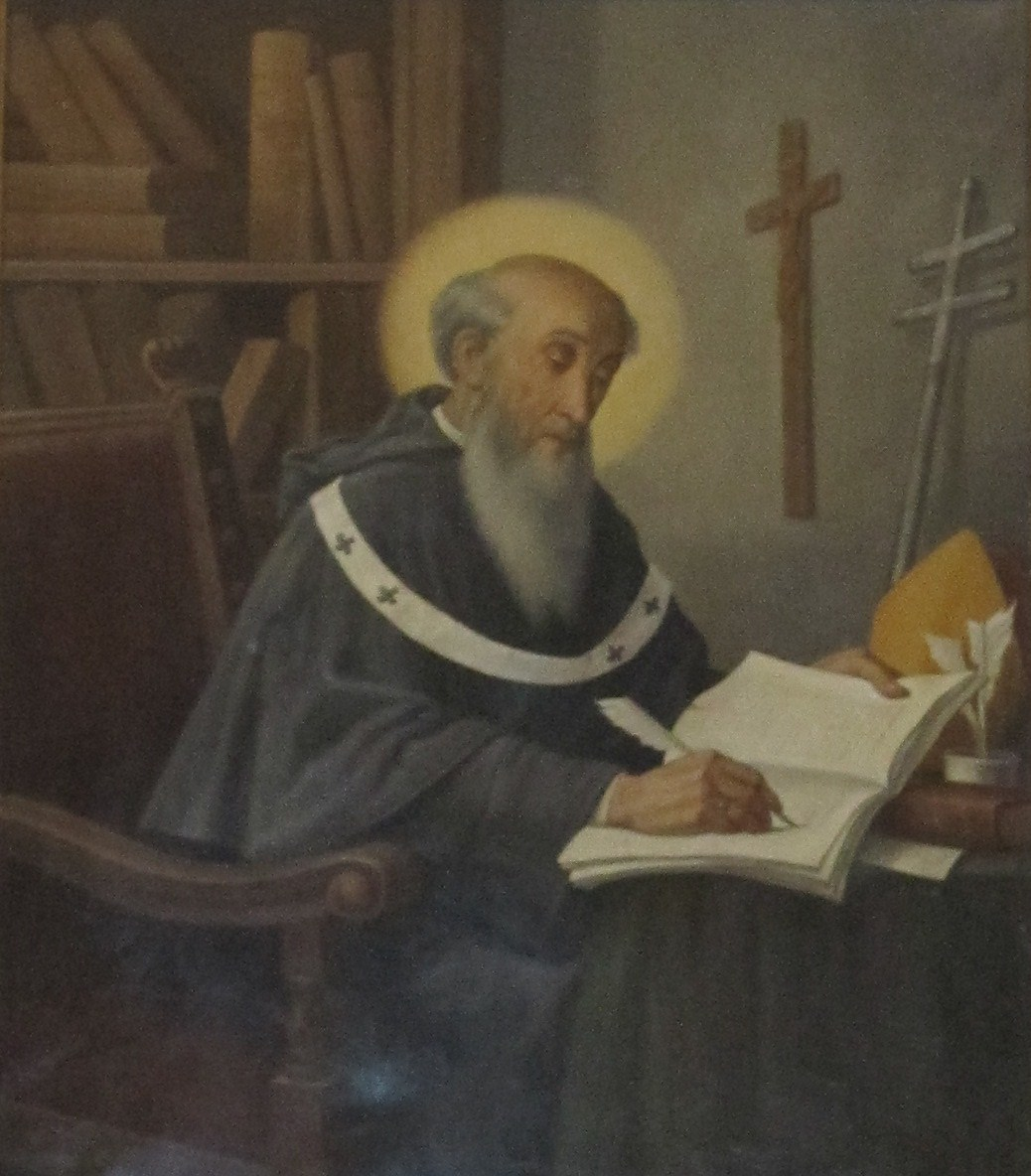
Giacomo Capocci da Viterbo

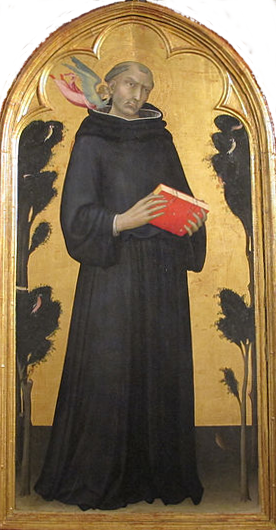
Agostino Novello da Tarano

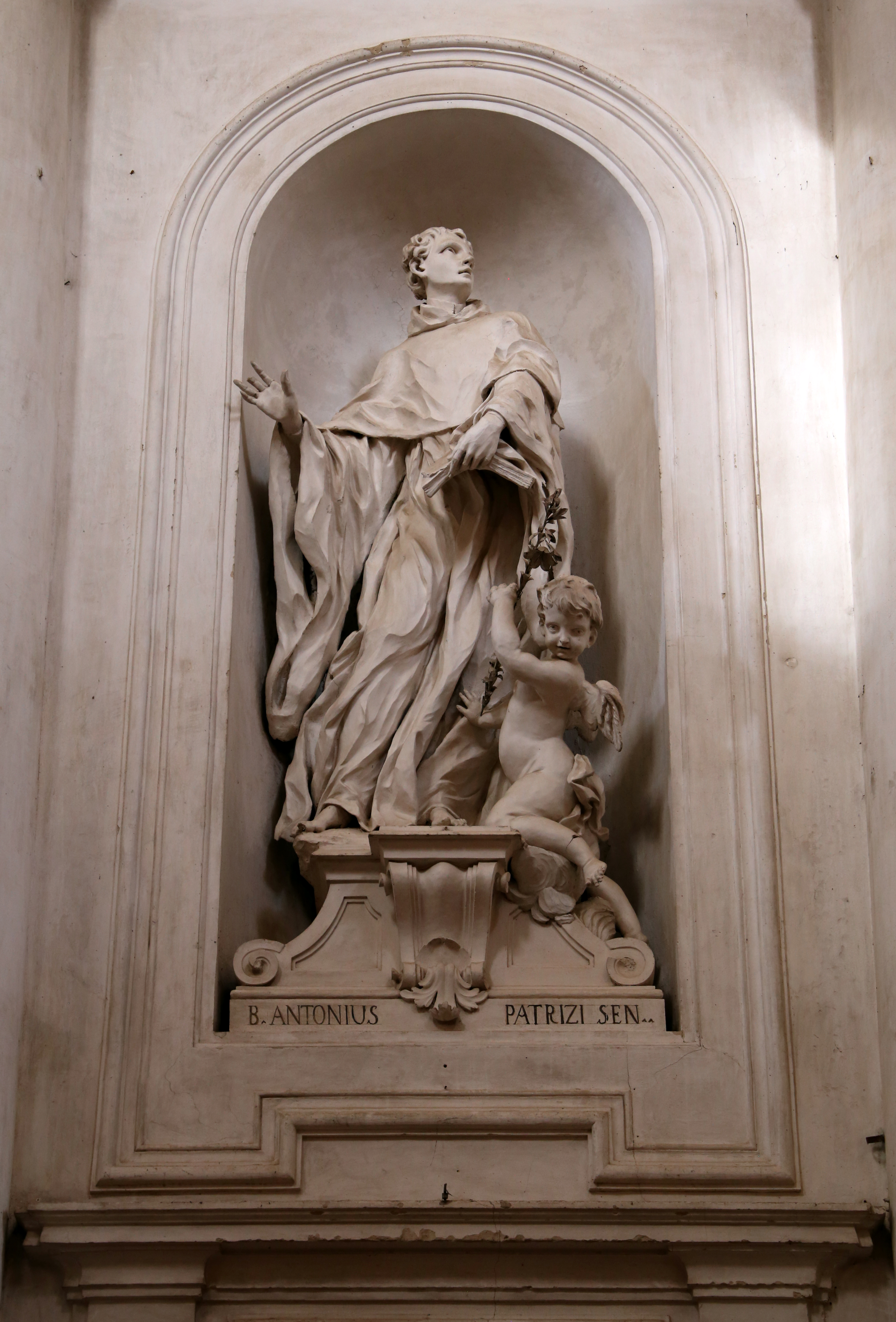
Antonio Patrizi da Monticiano

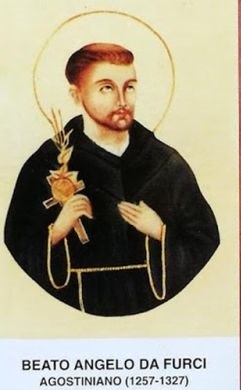
Angelo da Furci

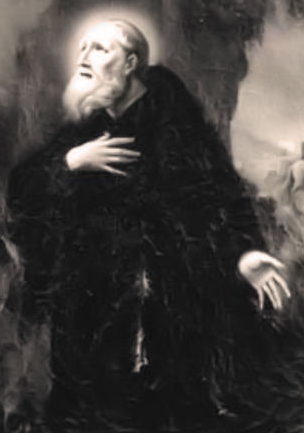
Gregorio Celli

Simone Fidati da Cascia

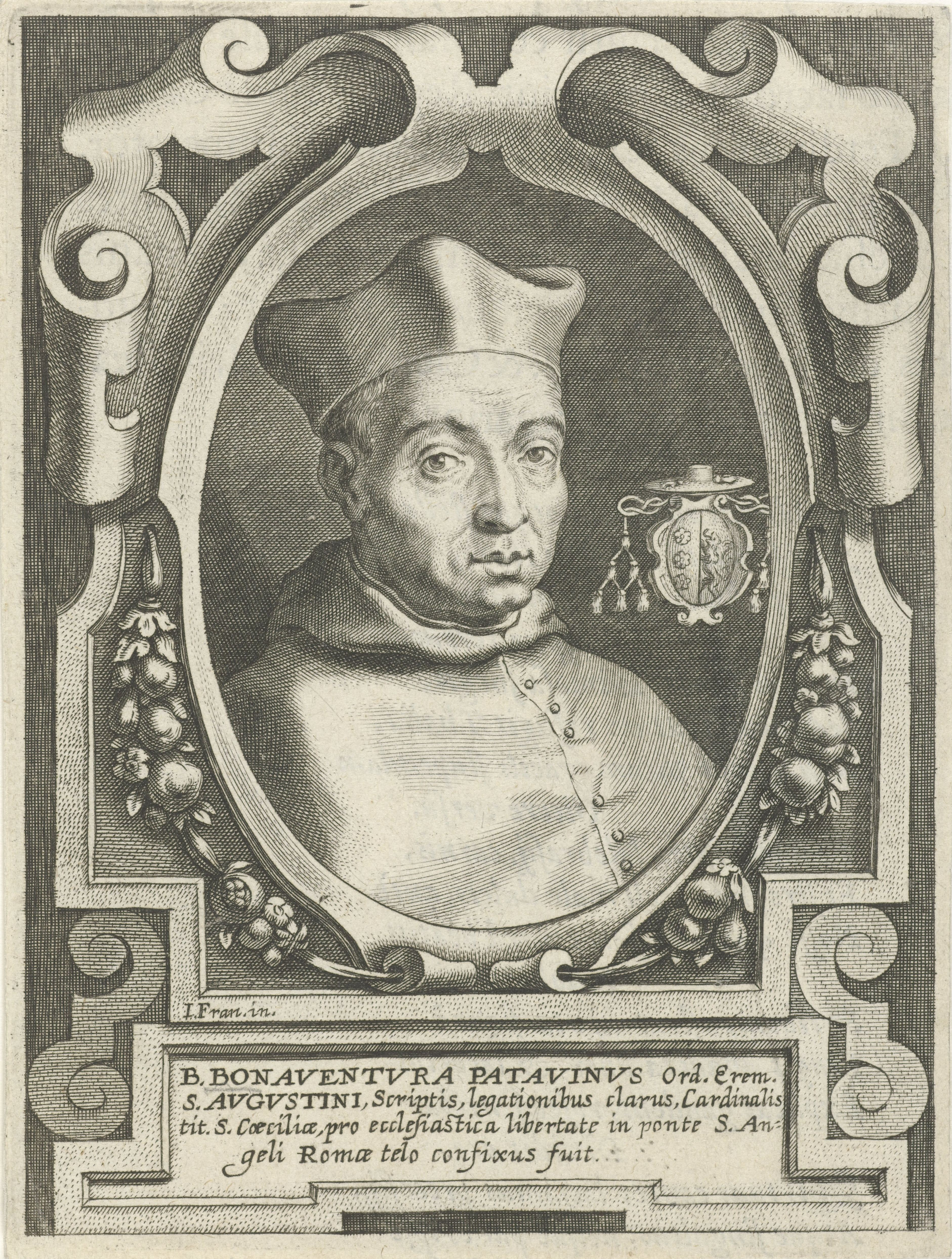
Bonaventura Badoer da Peraga

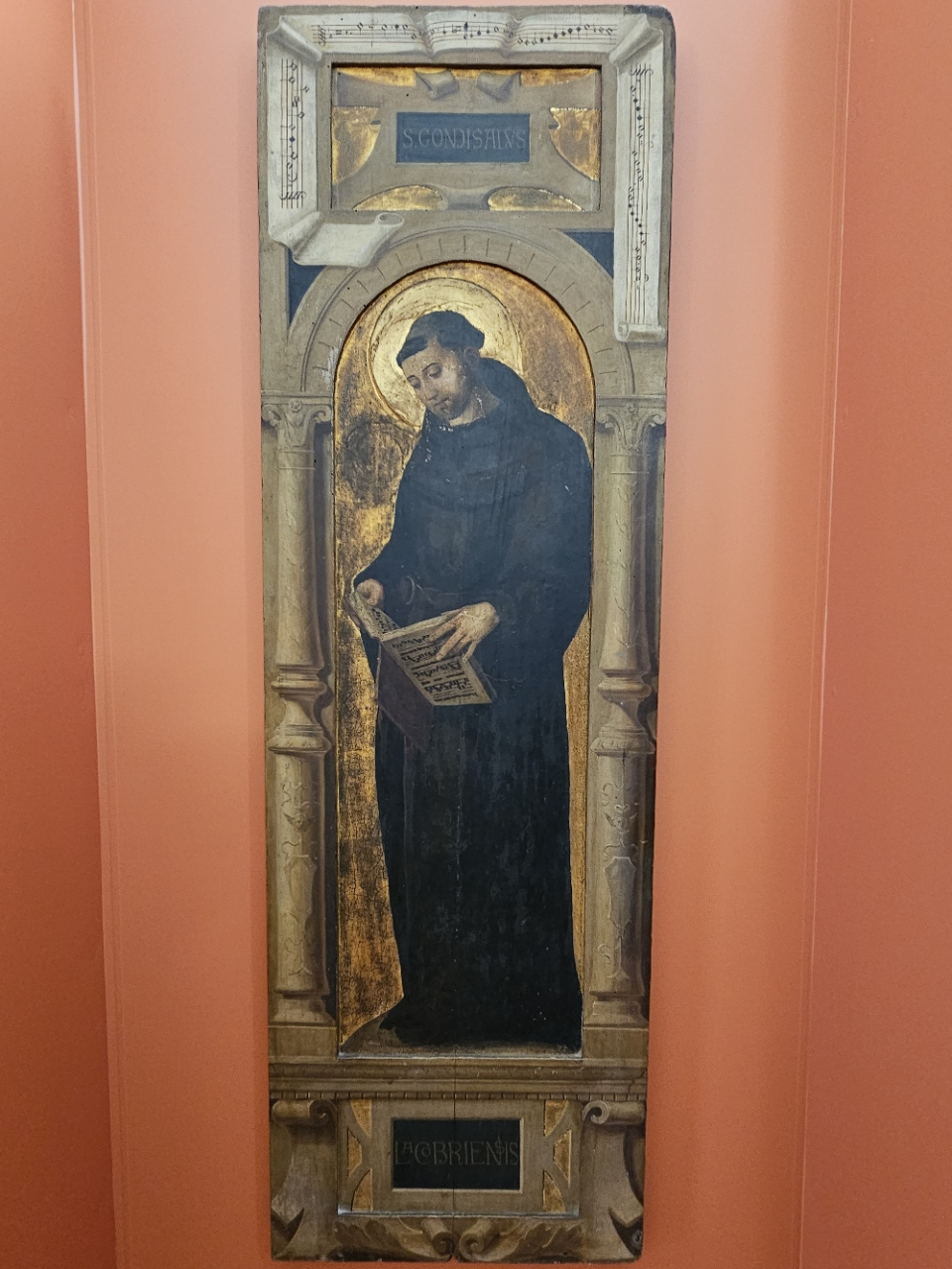
Gonçalo de Lagos

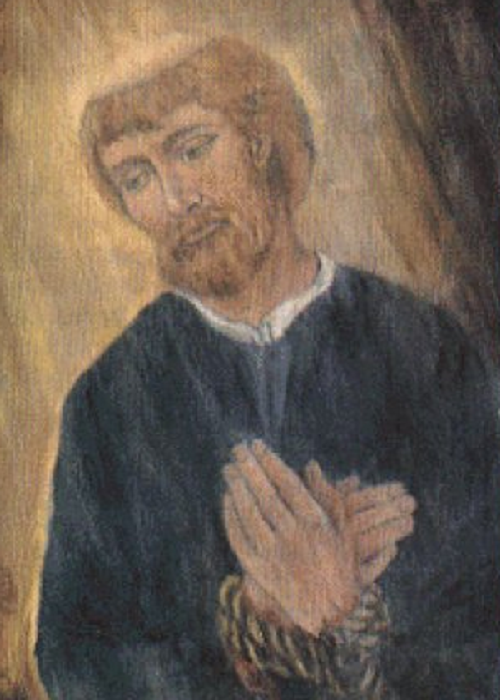
William Tirry

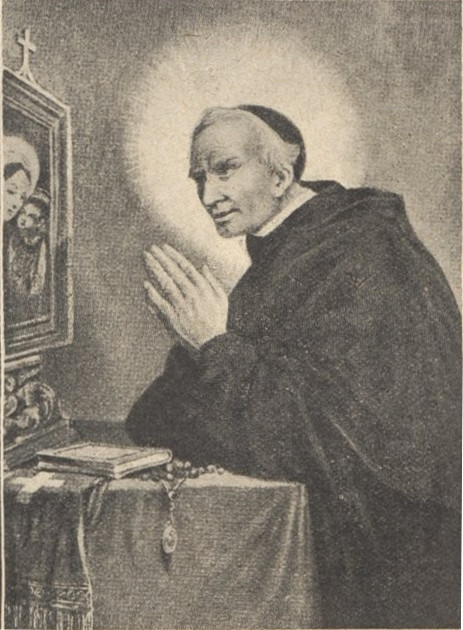
Stefano Bellesini

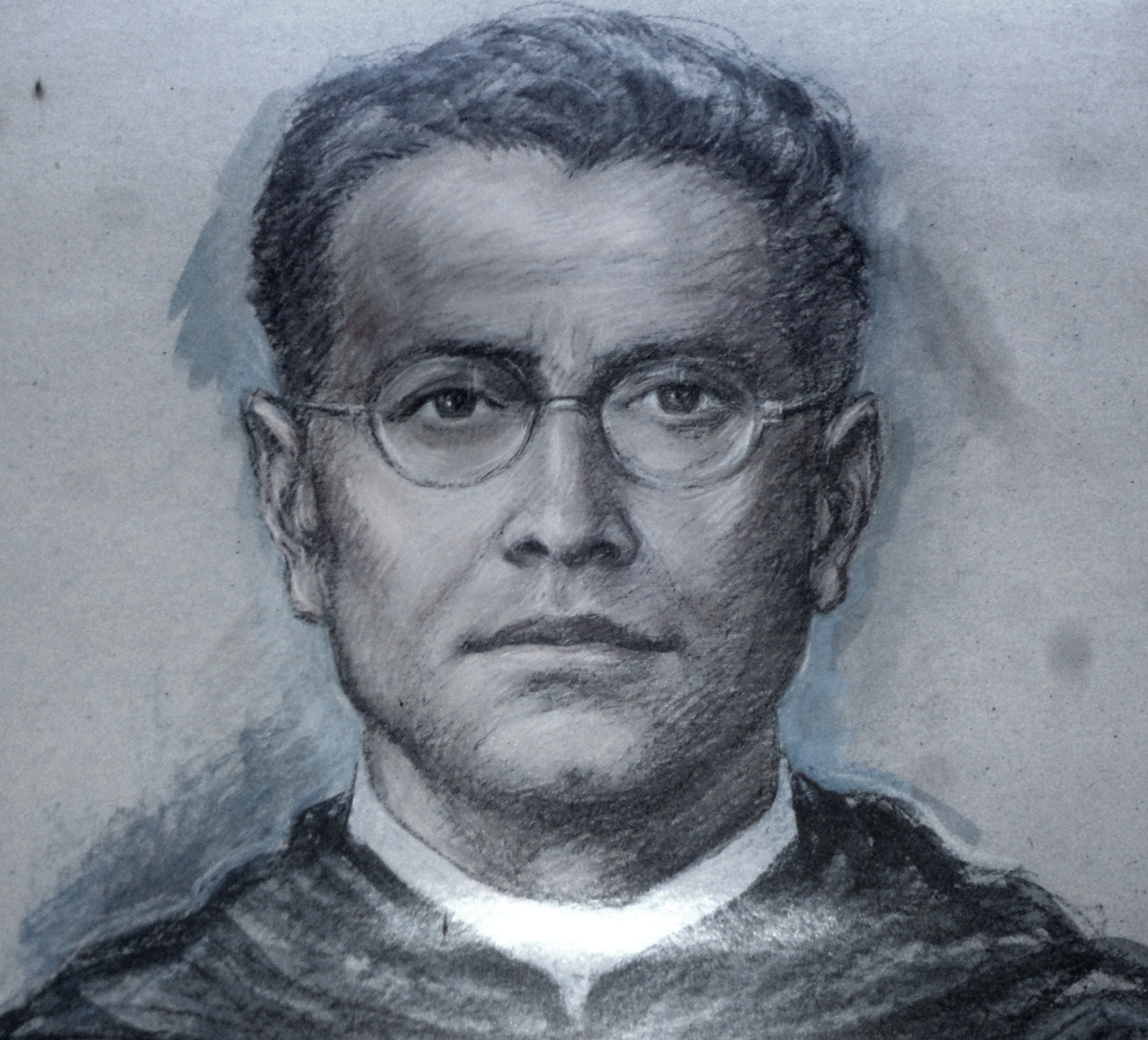
Elias del Socorro

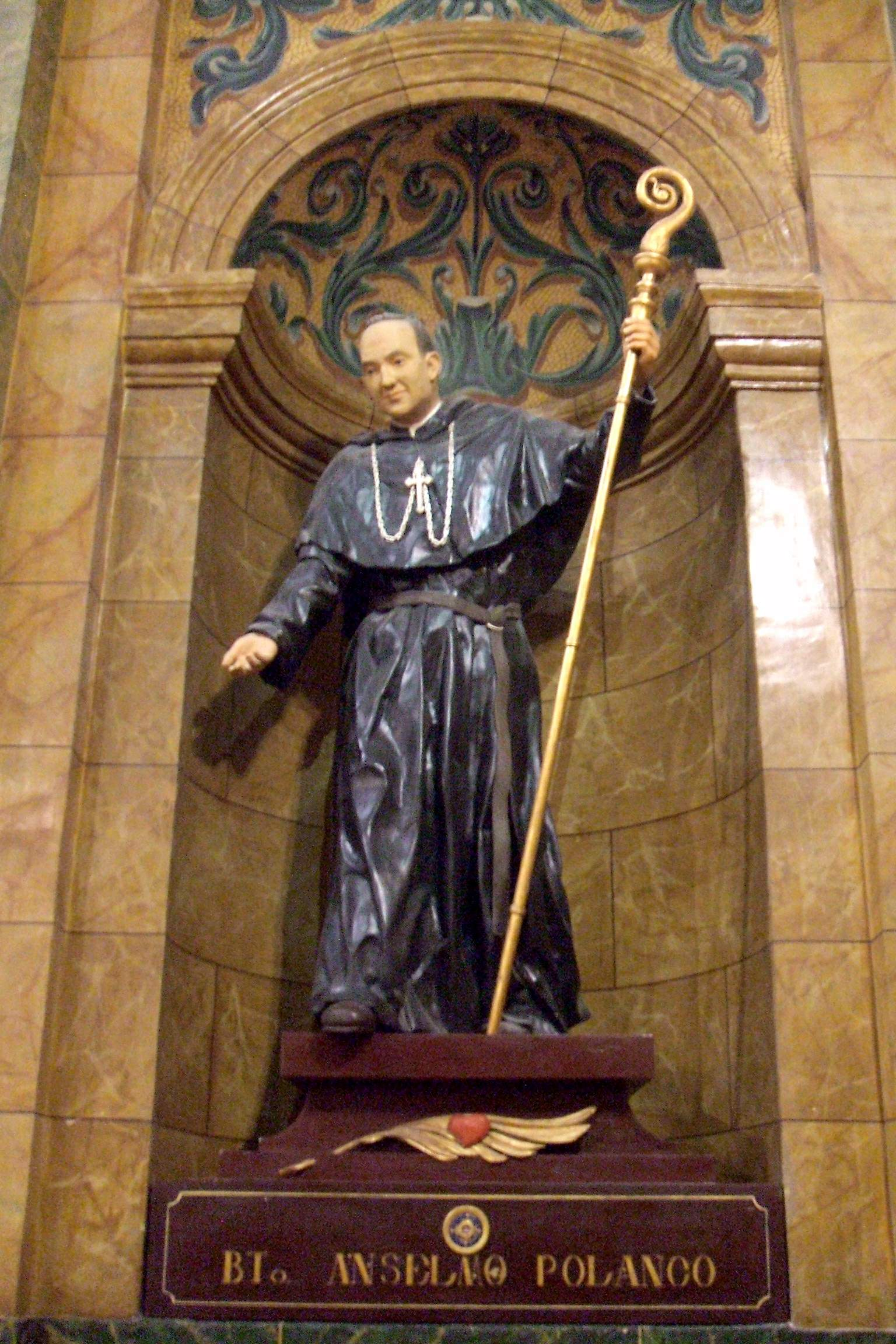
Anselmo Polanco Fontecha
- Giovanni Bono (c. 1168 – 16 October 1249), hermit, beatified in 1483
- Ugolino da Gualdo Cattaneo (1200 – 1 January 1260), professed religious and founder of a convent, beatified on 12 March 1919
- Clemente da Osimo (c. 1235 – 8 April 1291), priest and reformer, beatified on 16 September 1761
- Evangelista and Pellegrino (fl.13th century), priests, beatified on 17 November 1837
- Pietro Ghigensi da Gubbio (died c. 1306), professed religious, beatified on 5 March 1847
- Angelo Scarpetti da Sansepolcro (c. 1230 – c. 1306), professed religious, beatified on 27 July 1921
- Filippo da Piacenza (died 24 May 1306), professed religious, beatified on 27 August 1766
- Giacomo Capocci da Viterbo (c. 1255 – c. 1307), Archbishop of Naples, beatified on 14 June 1911
- Agostino Novello da Tarano (1240 – 19 May 1309), priest, beatified on 11 July 1759
- Antonio Patrizi da Monticiano (17 January 1280 – 23 April 1311), priest, beatified on 1 March 1804
- Angelo Conti da Foligno (c. 1226 – 27 August 1312), priest, beatified on 11 March 1891
- Simone Rinalducci da Todi (died 20 April 1322), priest, beatified on 18 March 1833
- Angelo da Furci (c. 1246 – 6 February 1327), priest, beatified on 20 December 1888
- Friedrich von Regensburg (c. 1250 – 29 November 1329), German professed religious, beatified on 12 May 1909
- Gregorio Celli (purportedly 1225 – 11 May 1343), priest, beatified on 6 September 1769
- Giovanni Bufalari da Rieti (c. 1325 - 1 August 1347), professed religious, beatified on 9 April 1832
- Simone Fidati di Cascia (c. 1295 – 2 February 1348), ascetic, beatified on 23 August 1833
- Giacomo Cinti da Cerqueto (c. 1285 - 17 April 1366), priest, beatified on 10 June 1895
- Ugolino Zeffirini da Cortona (c. 1320 - c. 1367), hermit, beatified on 21 October 1804
- Girolamo Gherarducci da Recanati (died 12 March 1350), priest, beatified on 4 July 1804
- Guillaume de Toulouse (c. 1297 - 18 May 1369), French priest, beatified on 18 April 1893
- Bonaventura Badoer da Peraga (22 June 1332 - 10 June 1389), Cardinal and Prior General of the Order, beatified in 1440.
- Sante da Cori (c. 1339 - c. 1392), priest, beatified on 1 February 1888
- Giovanni Becchetti da Fabriano (died c. 1420), priest, beatified on 28 August 1835
- Pietro Becchetti da Fabriano (died c. 1421), priest, beatified on 28 August 1835
- Gonçalo de Lagos (c. 1360 – 15 October 1422), Portuguese priest, beatified on 27 May 1778
- Antonio Migliorati da Amandola (17 January 1355 - 25 January 1450), professed religious, beatified on 11 July 1759
- Andrea da Montereale (c. 1403 – 18 April 1479), priest, beatified on 18 February 1764
- Cherubino Testa da Avigliana (c. 1451 - 17 September 1479), professed religious, beatified on 21 September 1865
- Antonio Torriani dell'Aquila (c. 1424 - 24 July 1494), professed religious, beatified on 11 July 1759
- Pietro Giacomo da Pesaro (c. 1447 - c. 1496), professed religious, beatified on 27 September 1848
- Grazia da Cattaro (Gracija de Kotor) (27 October 1438 - 9 November 1508), Montenegrin professed religious, beatified on 6 June 1889
- Hernando Ayala Fernandez de San Jose (c. 1575 - 1 June 1617), martyr of Japan, beatified on 7 May 1867
- Pedro Manrique de Zúñiga Velasco (c. 1579 - 19 August 1622), martyr of Japan, beatified on 7 May 1867
- Bartolomé Gutiérrez Espinosa (4 September 1580 - 3 September 1632), martyr of Japan, beatified on 7 May 1867
- Thomas ‘Kintsuba’ Jihyoe of Saint Augustine (c. 1602 - 6 November 1637), martyr of Japan, beatified on 24 November 2008
- William Tirry (Liam Turidh) (c. 1609 – 12 May 1654), martyred during the Cromwellian Conquest of Ireland, beatified on 27 September 1992
- Stefano Bellesini (25 November 1774 - 2 February 1840), priest, beatified on 27 December 1904
- Mateo Elías Nieves del Castillo (Elías del Socorro) (21 September 1882 - 10 March 1928), Martyr of the Cristero War, beatified on 12 October 1997
- Avelino Rodríguez Alonso and 97 Companions (died between 24 July to 23 December 1936), Martyrs of the Spanish Civil War, beatified on 28 October 2007
- Anselmo Polanco Fontecha (16 April 1881 - 7 February 1939), Bishop of Teurel martyred during the Spanish Civil War, beatified on 1 October 1995
- Mariano de la Mata Aparício (31 December 1905 - 5 April 1983), Spanish missionary to Brazil, beatified on 5 November 2006

Declared Blessed by popular acclaim

- Lanfranco Settala di Milan (died c. 1265), 1st Prior General of the Augustinian Order
- Alberto Pandoni (c. 1200 - 14 August 1274), Bishop of Ferrara
- Guido da Staggia (died 1289), 2nd Prior General of the Augustinian Order
- Agostino da Ancona (Agostino Trionfo) (c.1243 – 2 April 1328), writer
- Pietro Salimbeni (died c. 1330), priest from the hermitage of Lecceto
- Giovanni Gucci (c. 1275 - c. 1339), laybrother
- Pietro da Rosia (died c. 1345), penitent
- Bartolomeo da Urbino (died c. 1350), Bishop of Urbino and friend of the poet Francesco Petrarca
- Giovanni Chigi (c. 1300 - c. 1363), laybrother
- Nicola Tini (c. 1303 - 9 February 1387), prior of the hermitage of Lecceto and miracle-worker
- Bandino Scotti (died c. 1391), penitent
- Giorgio Laccioli da Cremona (died c. 1451), prior
- Alessandro Oliva da Sassoferato (c. 1407 - 20 August 1463), Cardinal-Priest of Santa Susanna
- Andrea Bondumier (died 6 August 1464), Patriarch of Venice
- Simone da Camerino (died 12 March 1478), orator and peacemaker who inspired Blessed Grazia da Cattaro to the Augustinian way of life after having heard one of his sermons
- Bertramo da Fermo (died c. 1491), Spanish priest who tended to the lepers of the Hospital of San Marco in Padule
- Giacomo da Napoli (died c. 1508), pilgrim and founder of the Santuario della Madonna del Soccorso in Cartoceto di Fano
- Felice da Corsano (died 20 September 1536), professed religious
- Paolo da Barletta (died c. 13 May 1580), missionary to India

Venerables

- Giuseppe Bartolomeo Menochio (19 March 1741 - 25 March 1823), Titular Bishop of Porphyrien, declared Venerable on 14 May 1991
- Giovanni Battista Jossa (c. January 1767 - 4 July 1828), lay Augustinian, declared Venerable on 22 June 1972
- Johannes (Pius) Keller (25 September 1825 - 15 March 1904), German priest, declared Venerable on 3 July 2008
- Vinzenz (Clemens) Fuhl (18 June 1874 - 31 March 1935), German priest, declared Venerable on 9 December 2013
- Sebastián Elorza Arizmendi (31 October 1882 - 8 December 1942), professed religious, declared Venerable on 3 April 2014
- José Estanislao (Miguel Francisco) Zavala López (12 November 1867 - 4 April 1947), priest, declared Venerable on 21 December 2018
- Gregorio Tomás Suárez Fernández (30 March 1915 - 23 April 1949), priest, declared Venerable on 11 December 2019

Servants of God

- Izajasz Boner (c. 1400 - 8 November 1477), Polish priest, declared Servant of God on 1 February 1997
- Juan Bautista de Moya Valenzuela (24 June 1504 - 20 December 1567), declared Servant of God on 15 July 1996
- Diego Ruiz Ortiz (24 July 1532 - May or July 1571), missionary and martyr, declared Servant of God on 23 October 1991
- Agustín de Gormáz Velasco (c. 1508 - 24 November 1589), Bishop of Popayan, declared Servant of God on 5 July 1995
- Luis López de Solís (c. 1535 - 5 July 1606), Bishop of Quito, declared Servant of God on 2 February 1995
- Antonio of the Nativity, Antonio of the Passion, and Domingos of the Nativity (died between 16 and 21 August 1631), martyrs
- Peter Taafe (died 11 September 1649), martyred during the Siege of Drogheda
- Ange le Proust (3 December 1624 - 16 October 1697), founder of the Sisters of Saint Thomas of Villanova, declared Servant of God in August 2016
- Tommaso Antonio Arbuatti (14 November 1673 - 27 July 1746), priest, declared Servant of God on 14 May 1996
- Joseph Janin (c. 1716 - 14 March 1794), Martyr of the French Revolution, declared Servant of God on 20 June 2023
- Diego José de Rejas Peralta (11 November 1807 - 14 September 1867), priest
- Abilio Gallego Abad (2 September 1895 - 22 August 1933), missionary and martyr in China, declared Servant of God on 14 May 2004
- Francisco Vicioso Corraliza (21 October 1883 - 25 July 1936), Martyr of the Spanish Civil War, declared Servant of God on 13 November 2008
- Plácido Mallo Gutiérrez and Juan Montalvo González (died 25 July 1936), Martyrs of the Spanish Civil War
- Victorio Martin Gago and 7 Companions (died between November 1936 to March 1937), Martyrs of the Spanish Civil War, declared Servant of God on 6 September 2016
- Mateo de la Hera Cabeza and Felipe Martinez Ortiz (died 26 July 1936 and c. May 1937), Martyrs of the Spanish Civil War from the Diocese of Cuenca, declared Servant of God on 6 September 2016
- Daniel Delgado Garcia and Jose Perez de Celis (died 23 July 1936 and 5 August 1936), Martyrs of the Spanish Civil War from the Diocese of Albacete
- Tomás Bermejo Valenciano (7 March 1892 - 26 April 1937), Martyr of the Spanish Civil War
- Bolesław (Wilhelm) Gaczek and 3 Companions (died 1941 and 1942), martyrs under the Nazi Occupation of Poland
- František (Augustin) Schubert (14 May 1902 - 28 June 1942), martyr of the Second World War
- Luigi Pera (19 July 1879 - 19 November 1952), priest
- Francesc Cantarellas Ballester (15 August 1884 - 22 April 1968), priest
- Moisés González Crespo (25 November 1941 - 18 December 1980), priest
- Diego Gutiérrez Pedraza (15 September 1894 - 23 November 1990), Bishop of Cafayate
- John Joseph McKniff (5 September 1905 - 24 March 1994), American priest, declared Servant of God on 7 July 2000
- Agustín Liébana del Blanco (28 May 1923 - 31 January 1998), priest, declared Servant of God on 5 June 2006
- Salustiano Míguelez Romero (19 February 1919 - 19 December 1999), priest
- Serapio Rivero Nicolás (14 November 1917 - 24 November 2002), priest
- Matteo de Angelis (9 December 1924 - 14 May 2003), priest, declared Servant of God on 24 February 2015
- Nazzareno (Grazzja) Gauci (9 February 1911 - 8 February 2005), professed religious
- Mario Gentili (13 May 1928 - 2 May 2006), priest
- William Edward (Bill) Atkinson (4 January 1946 - 15 September 2006), American priest

== Legacy and impact ==
The work of the Augustinians includes teaching, scientific study, parish and pastoral work and missions. Agostino Ciasca (d. 1902), titular Archbishop of Larissa and cardinal, established a special faculty for Semitic languages at the Roman Seminary, published an Arabic translation of Tatian's "Diatessaron" and wrote "Bibliorum Fragmenta Copto-Sahidica". The missionaries of the order have also given us valuable descriptive works on foreign countries and peoples.

=== Teaching ===
The history of education makes frequent mention of Augustinians who distinguished themselves particularly as professors of philosophy and theology at the great universities of Salamanca, Coimbra, Alcalá, Padua, Pisa, Naples, Oxford, Paris, Vienna, Prague, Würzburg, Erfurt, Heidelberg, and Wittenberg, amongst others. Others taught successfully in the schools of the order, which controlled a number of secondary schools, colleges, and other educational institutions. In 1685 the Bishop of Würzburg, Johann Gottfried II, confided to the care of the Augustinians the parish and the gymnasium of Munnerstadt in Lower Franconia (Bavaria), a charge that they still retain; connected with the monastery of St. Michael in that place is a monastic school, while the seminary directed by the Augustinians forms another convent, that of St. Joseph. The order possesses altogether fifteen colleges, academies and seminaries in Italy, Spain and America. The chief institutions of this kind in Spain are that at Valladolid and that in the Escorial.

=== Notable figures ===
The Augustianian Order has produced a number of notable members, especially theologians and writers.

- Giles of Rome (d. 1316), Archbishop of Bourges, a General of the Order, and a prominent Scholastic theologian and philosopher. Known as the founder of the Augustinian School of Theology. Called Doctor fundatissimus.
- Alexander a S. Elpideo (d. 1326), Bishop of Melfi.
- Augustinus Triumphus (d. 1328).
- Dionigi di Borgo San Sepolcro (d. 1342), known for his influence on Petrarch.
- John de Egglescliffe (d. 1347), a bishop.
- Thomas of Strasburg (d. 1357), a General of the Order, and a prominent Scholastic theologian.
- Gregory of Rimini (d. 1358), a General of the Order, and a prominent Scholastic theologian.
- Nikolaus von Laun (d. 1371), a notable theologian and bishop.
- Hugolino of Orvieto (d. 1373), a notable theologian.
- Johann Klenkok (Klenke) (d. 1374), author of the Decadicon, an attack on the Sachsenspiegel.
- Simon of Cremona (d. 1390), a well-known preacher.
- Johann Hiltalinger (d. 1392), Bishop of Lombez and a theologian.
- Thomas Edwardston (d. 1396), a bishop and theologian.
- Walter Hilton (d. 1396), a prominent mystic.
- Paul of Venice (d. 1429), a prominent philosopher.
- Andrea Biglia (d. 1435), a prominent Humanist writer and historian.
- Gabriele Sforza (d. 1457), Archbishop of Milan.
- Johannes von Goch (d. 1475), a theologian, argued to have been a precursor to the Protestant Reformation.
- Raymond Peraudi (d. 1505), a Cardinal and Papal legate.
- Huan Blackleach (d. 1509), held the episcopal post of Bishop of Sodor and Man.
- Ambrogio Calepino (d. 1510), a notable lexicographer.
- Dietrich Coelde (d. 1515), known for producing one of the first catechisms in German, became a Franciscan.
- Giacomo Filippo Foresti (d. 1520), a Biblical commentator and chronicler.
- Bernard André (d. 1522), a poet in the court of Henry VII of England.
- Aegidius of Viterbo (d. 1532), a Cardinal, Bishop of Viterbo, theologian, orator, poet and Humanist scholar.
- Bartholomaeus Arnoldi (d. 1532), a theologian and an opponent of the Protestant Reformation.
- Felix Pratensis (d. 1539), a proselytiser to the Jews.
- Martin Luther (d. 1546), a theologian and a seminal figure in the Reformation
- Johannes Hoffmeister (d. 1547), a theologian and an opponent of the Protestant Reformation.
- Girolamo Seripando (d. 1563), a Cardinal, a reformer of the Order, and a prominent figure in the Council of Trent.
- Onofrio Panvinio (d. 1568), a notable historian and antiquary.
- Martín de Rada (d. 1578), a missionary to China and the Philippines.
- Alonso Gutiérrez (d. 1584), a student of the School of Salamanca and advocate of human rights in the Americas.
- Caspar Casal (d. 1587), Bishop of Coimbra
- Luis de León (d. 1591), a notable poet, theologian, and academic.
- Juan de la Anunciación (d. 1594), a missionary to the Americas.
- Aleixo de Menezes (d. 1617), Archbishop of Goa and Viceroy of Portugal.
- Juan González de Mendoza (d. 1618), a bishop and an historian of China.
- Angelo Rocca (d. 1620), titular Bishop of Tagaste and Papal sacristan, known for founding the Angelica Library, which became the Augustinians' public library in Rome, and for his liturgical and archaeological research.
- Gregorio Nuñez Coronel (d. 1620).
- Cornelius Lancilottus (d. 1622), a spiritual writer and biographer of St Augustine.
- Ferrante Pallavicino (d. 1644), a controversial writer and satirist.
- Joachim Brulius (d. after 1652), a historian who wrote on the Christianisation and colonisation of Peru, and wrote a history of China.
- Antonio de la Calancha (d. 1684), an anthropologist of the peoples of South America.
- Payo Enríquez de Rivera (d. 1684), a missionary, Bishop, and administrator within the Americas.
- John Skerrett, a missionary to the Americas.
- Henry Noris (d. 1704), a Cardinal, ecclesiastical historian and theologian. Accused of advocating Jansenism.
- Casimiro Díaz (d. 1746), a missionary to and writer of the Philippines.
- Giovanni Lorenzo Berti (d. 1766), a prominent theologian, accused of advocating Jansenism.
- Enrique Florez (d. 1773), a prominent historian who wrote on the history of Spain.
- Marko Pohlin (d. 1801), a philologist and author.
- Manuel Risco, (d. 1801) a historian and author.
- Christian Joseph Jagemann (d. 1804), later converted to Protestantism and became a courtier to Duchess Anna Amalia of Brunswick-Wolfenbüttel.
- James Warren Doyle (d. 1834), a campaigner for Catholic Emancipation in Ireland.
- Francisco Manuel Blanco (d. 1845), a botanist.
- Gregor Mendel (d. 1884), a prominent scientist, known for his work in the field of genetics.
- Pavel Křížkovský (d. 1885), a composer and conductor.
- Agostino Ciasca (d. 1902), a Cardinal, Orientalist and archivist of the Vatican Archives.
- Pius Keller (d. 1904), helped to revitalise the Order in Germany.
- Tomáš Eduard Šilinger (d. 1913), a Czech politician and journalist.
- Thomas Cooke Middleton (d. 1923).
- F. X. Martin (d. 2000), a historian.
- Egidio Galea (d. 2005), involved within the Catholic Resistance to Nazism.
- Michael Campbell (1941– ), Bishop of Lancaster.
- Daniel Thomas Turley Murphy (1943– ), Bishop of Chulucanas.
- Gilbert Luis R. Centina III, a poet.
- Peter M. Donohue, a President of Villanova University.
- Patrick Fahey, a liturgist and musician.
- Wiesław Dawidowski (1964– ), a journalist.
- Robert Dodaro, former President of the Patristic Institute Augustinianum
- Robert Prevost, Bishop of Diocese of Chiclayo, Peru (2015–2023), prefect of Dicastery for Bishops (2023– 2025), Elected Pope Leo XIV (2025).
- Stephano Lameck Musomba (2021– ), Auxiliary Bishop of Dar es Salaam

== See also ==
- Augustinian nuns
- Discalced Augustinians
- Independent Augustinian communities
- Order of Augustinian Recollects
- Society of Saint Augustine
