= Hugolino of Orvieto =

- Born: after 1300; Orvieto
- Died: 1373; Aquapendente

Philosophical work
- Era: Medieval philosophy
- Region: Western philosophy
- School: Scholasticism
- Main interests: Theology, epistemology, ontology

Hugolino of Orvieto, O.S.A. was an important Scholastic theologian and Augustinian friar of the fourteenth century, representing the Augustinian School of thought within the theological and philosophical spheres.

Hugolino was born sometime after 1300 in Orvieto in modern-day Italy and died in 1373 in Aquapendente. The first written mentions of Hugolino came in 1334, when he studied at the University of Paris from 1335 to 1338. Between 1347 and 1348, Hugolino gave lectures on the Sentences of Peter Lombard, and was promoted to the position of Master of Theology in 1352. Later, between 1357 and 1360, Hugolino taught at the Augustinian Order's house of studies in Perugia, and from 1360, Hugolino taught at the University of Bologna.

Later, in 1368, Hugolino was elected as prior general of the Augustinian Order, and later on in 1370, he was consecrated Bishop of Gallipoli. A year later in 1371, Hugolino was appointed as the Latin Patriarch of Constantinople by Pope Gregory XI, and was made the administrator of the diocese of Rimini.

== Thought ==
Hugolino's thought was rooted strongly in that of St Augustine and his fellow Augustinian friar, Gregory of Rimini, and Hugolino viciously attacked the Aristotelianism that prevailed prior to the fourteenth century within the theological sphere, particularly with regards to Aristotelian ethics. He focused particularly on Augustine's notion of divine illumination, and maintained the necessity of God's grace in all the morally good acts that the human performs. Moreover, Hugolino strongly opposed Joachim of Fiore's understanding of the Trinity.
