= Thomas Edwardston =

Thomas Edwardston (died 1396), was an Augustinian friar.

Edwardston is said to have been born at a place called Edwardston in Suffolk, whence he derived his name. He studied at the University of Oxford, where he obtained the D.D. degree. He became a friar eremite of the order of St. Augustine at the monastery of Clare in his native county, and was eventually made prior. He was confessor to Lionel, duke of Clarence, and accompanied him to Italy on the occasion of his marriage with the daughter of the Duke of Milan.

On his return to England, Edwardston took over the charge of archiepiscopal duties, but in what diocese is not known; it was probably in a temporary vacancy, for it does not appear that he was ever raised to the full dignity of an archbishop. He died at Clare 20 May 1396, and was buried in his monastery. He was the author of Sermones Solemnes, Determinationes Theologicæ, and Lecturæ Scholasticæ.
