= Pius Keller =

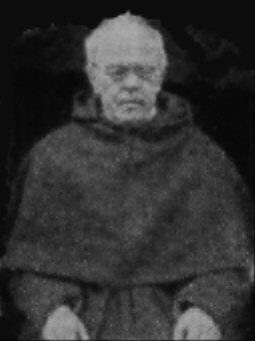
Venerable Pius Keller, OSA

Pius Keller, OSA (30 September 1825 in Ballingshausen, Bavaria, Germany – 15 March 1904 in Münnerstadt, Germany) was an Augustinian friar, a teacher, and a leader who revitalized the Order of Saint Augustine in Germany.

== Life and times ==
Pius Keller was raised in a farm family. His family supported his studies at Münnerstadt and at the University of Würzburg.

Pius entered a diocesan seminary in 1846. He was ordained a priest in 1849 and became a teacher in Münnerstadt. Later that year, Pius became a novice in the Order of Saint Augustine.

For most of his adult life, he was a teacher. He influenced many young students to follow the basic principles of the faith throughout their lives. The Order gave several positions of responsibility to Pius; he served several terms as Prior local superior in Münnerstadt, and was named Commissary General and Assistant General assistant world leader. It was in 1895 when he was chosen Prior Provincial regional superior of the newly restored Augustinian Province of Germany. Pius Keller reestablished community life and observance of the Rule and ideals of Saint Augustine. Under his leadership, the Order in Germany grew for when entered, the German Province had only two houses and eleven friars; there were nearly one-hundred friars in five monasteries by the year 1900. Pius spoke in his writings of his great love for history and for the Augustinian spiritual heritage. His remains are preserved at the monastery church in Münnerstadt since 1904.

== Beatification process ==
The cause for Pius Keller's beatification began in 1934. However, during World War II, most of the documents pertaining to his cause were destroyed. The process resumed in 1956. It was not until 1990 that the Congregation of Saints recognized the validity of his cause. In July 2008, Pope Benedict XVI stated Pius Keller's heroic degree of virtue, allowing him to be referred to as venerable. Josef Sciberras, OSA, is postulator of the cause.
