= Clare Priory =

House of Augustinian friars

Coordinates: 52.0751°N 0.5814°E

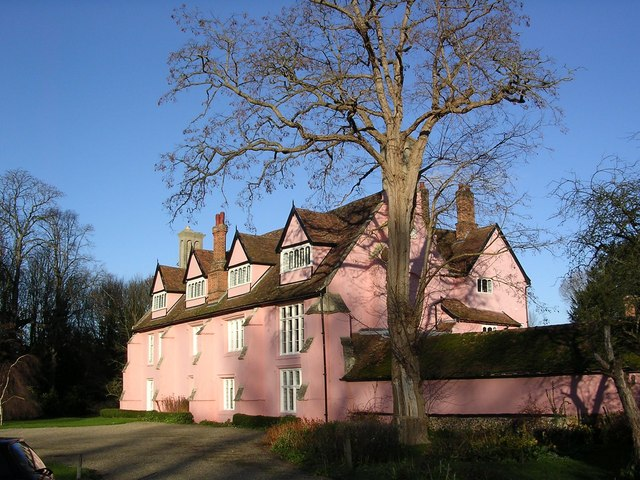
Clare Priory

Clare Priory is a religious house in England, originally established in 1248 as the first house of the Augustinian Friars in England. It is situated on the banks of the River Stour, a short distance away from the medieval village of Clare, Suffolk. The friary was suppressed in 1538 and the property passed through many hands until it was again purchased by the Augustinian friars in 1953. Today the Priory offers modern retreat facilities for guests.

== History ==
Clare Priory was established 1248 by Richard de Clare, 6th Earl of Gloucester, as a friary for the Order of St Augustine and a cell of Bec Abbey, Normandy. It was the first house of the Augustinian Friars in England.

In 1326, Edward II reconstituted it as a cell of Westminster Abbey.

By the 14th century the Augustinian order had had over 800 friars in England and Ireland, but these priories had declined (for other reasons) to around 300 friars before the anti-clerical laws of the Reformation Parliament and the Act of Supremacy.

Clare was one of the first English monastic houses suppressed in 1538 in the Dissolution of the Monasteries during the English Reformation. The partial list of monasteries dissolved by Henry VIII of England alone includes 18 Augustinian houses such as Bourne Abbey, Newstead Abbey and Waltham Abbey.

In 1604 the priory was converted into a home for Sir Thomas Barnardiston, grandfather of Sir Thomas Barnardiston, 1st Baronet. In the 17th and 18th centuries it belonged to the Baker family.

During the Baker family's ownership, a detailed dolls’ house was made in 1804 as a miniature replica of Clare Priory for the children of the family. The dolls’ house reproduces the appearance and furnishings of the house at the time and later passed, along with Clare Priory itself, into the ownership of the May family. It contains both everyday “play” furniture and more elaborate “good” furniture intended for display to visitors, reflecting contemporary domestic practices. Several of the miniature chairs were modelled on original furniture from Clare Priory and bear the Baker family coat of arms. The dolls’ house is now preserved and displayed at the Saffron Walden Museum.

In 1953, the Irish Augustinian Friars purchased the house with the help of the family who then owned it, and returned it to use as a religious house.

Clare Priory is a Grade I listed building, first listed in 1961. It retains some original features, such as the little cloister with the shrine, the vaulted porch, and stained glass. The shrine contains a relief of the Mother of Good Counsel by the religious artist, Mother Concordia OSB, based on the original fresco at Genazzano near Rome.

== Burials ==
- Joan of Acre (1272–1307), daughter of Edward I, Countess of Hertford and Countess of Gloucester
- Edward de Monthermer (1304–1339), Joan of Acre's youngest son
- Lionel of Antwerp, Duke of Clarence (1338–1368)
- Thomas Edwardston (d. 1396), prior of Clare Priory
- Edmund Mortimer, 5th Earl of March (d. 1425)

Signs at the priory, now corrected, previously included Elizabeth de Burgh, 4th Countess of Ulster among those buried there; she was actually buried at Bruisyard Abbey.

== Grounds ==
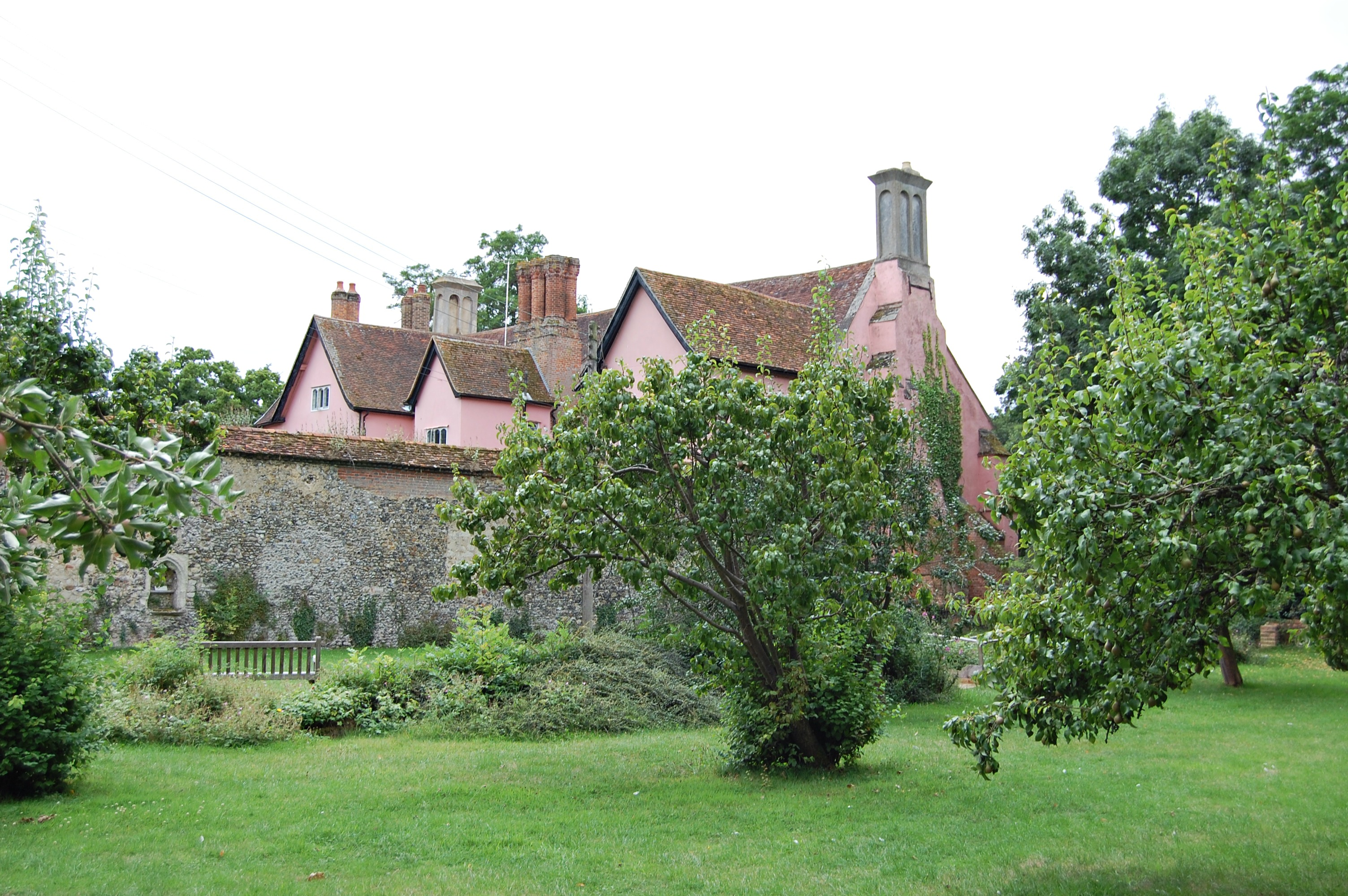
Garden

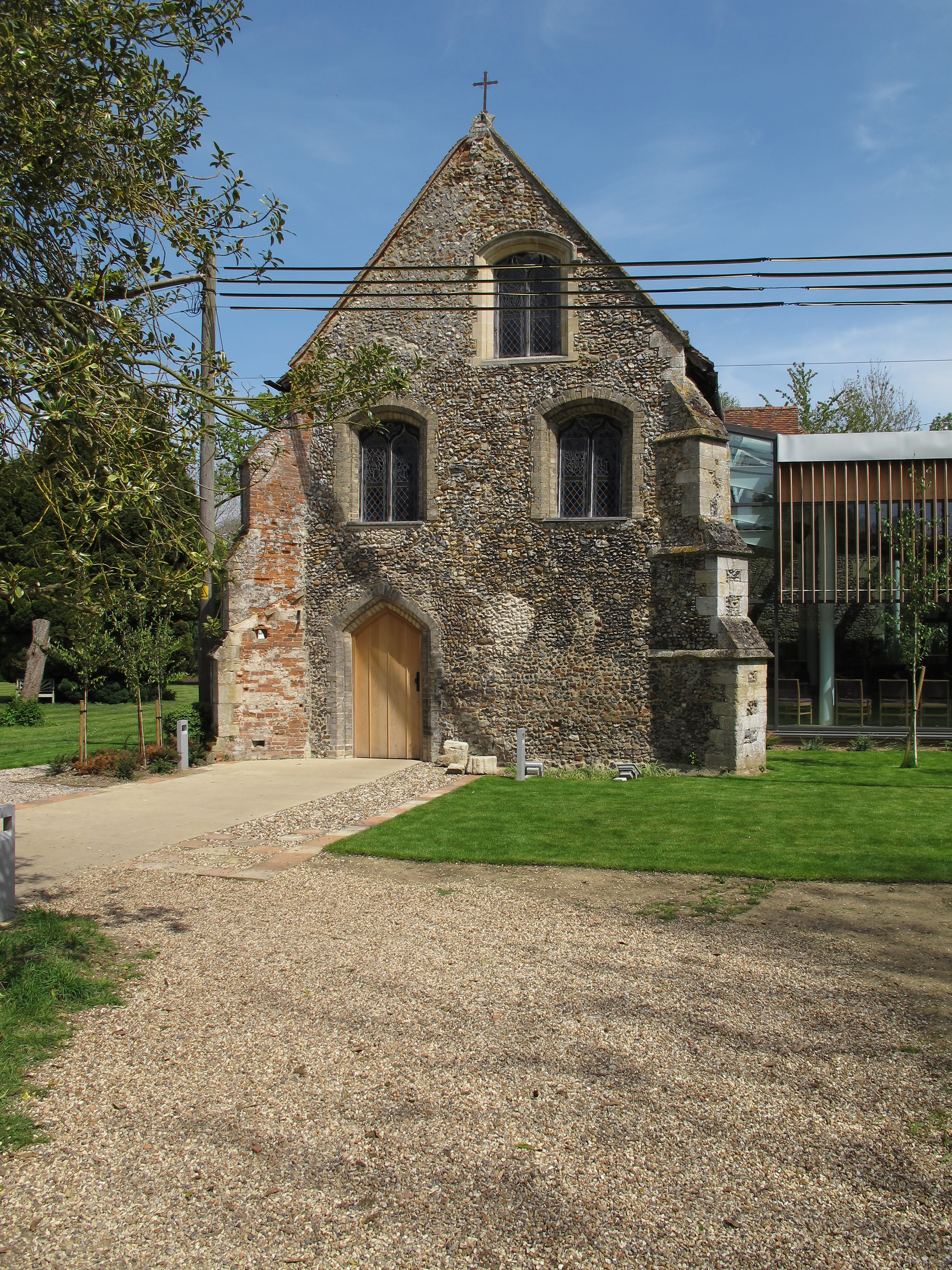
Church

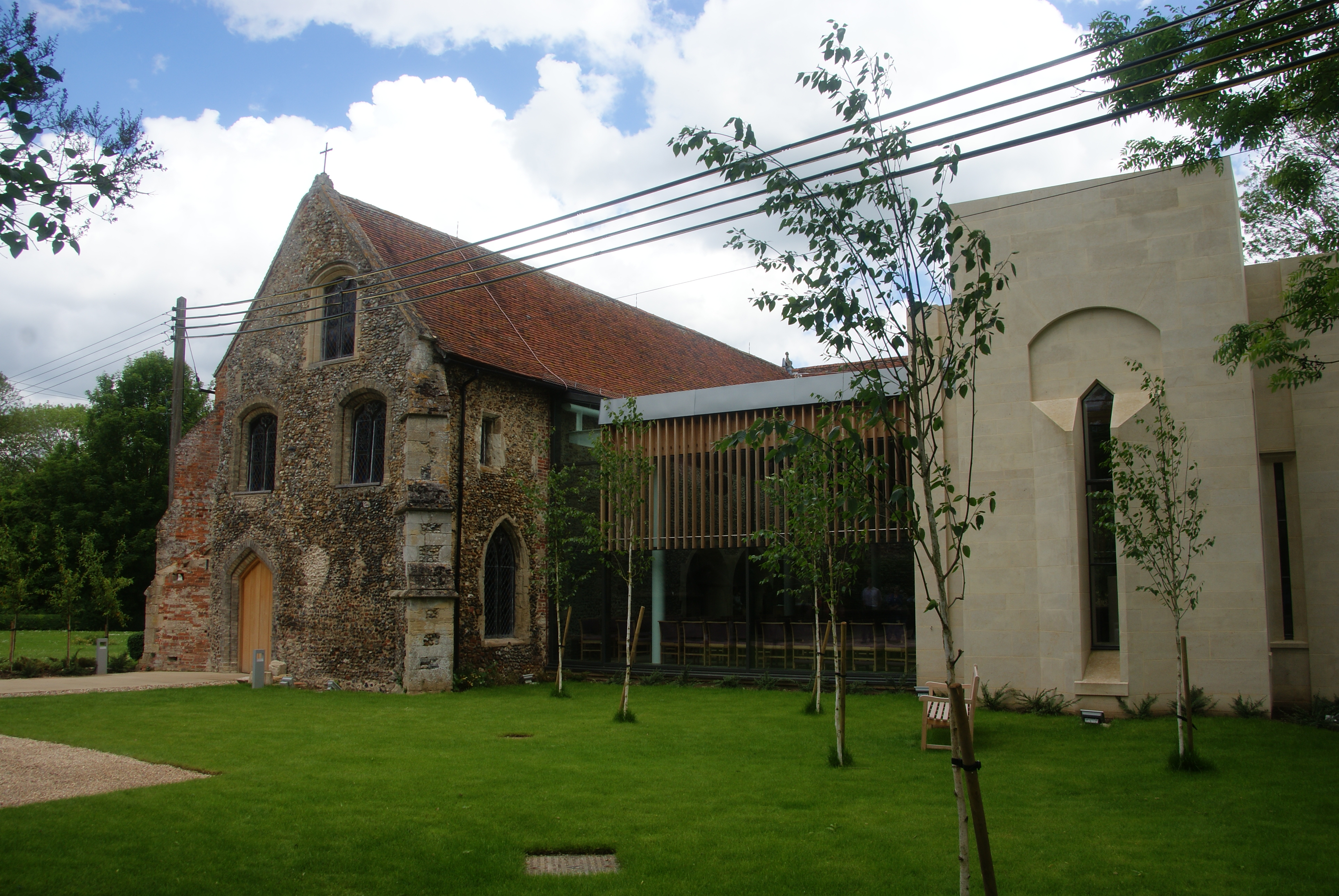
New church

== See also ==
- Catholic Church in England
- Holy Jesus Hospital
