= Agostino Ciasca =

His Eminence Agostino Ciasca O.E.S.A.
- Secretary of the Congregation for the Propagation of the Faith
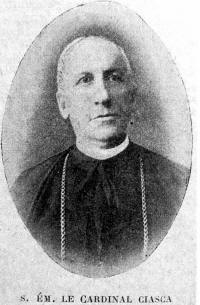
- Church: Roman Catholic Church
- Appointed: 19 June 1893
- Term ended: 6 February 1902
- Predecessor: Andrea Aiuti
- Successor: Camillo Laurenti
- Other post: Cardinal-Priest of San Callisto (1899-1902)
- Previous posts: Titular Archbishop of Larissa (1891-99); Prefect of the Vatican Secret Archives (1891-92); Pro-Secretary of the Congregation for the Propagation of the Faith (1892-93)

Orders
- Ordination: 18 September 1858 by Lorenzo Signani
- Consecration: 7 June 1891 by Mariano Rampolla del Tindaro
- Created cardinal: 19 June 1899 by Pope Leo XIII
- Rank: Cardinal-Priest

Personal details
- Born: Pasquale Raffaele Ciasca; 7 May 1835 Polignano a Mare, Bari, Kingdom of the Two Sicilies
- Died: 6 February 1902 (aged 66) Palazzo Cerasi, Rome, Kingdom of Italy
- Buried: Campo Verano (1902-38); Santa Maria del Popolo
- Parents: Leonardo Ciasca; Olimpia Montanari

Agostino Ciasca (secular name Pasquale) (born at Polignano a Mare, in the province of Bari, 7 May 1835; died at Rome, 6 February 1902) was an Italian Augustinian and Cardinal. He was a distinguished orientalist, and archivist of the Vatican Secret Archives.

== Life ==
He received the habit of the Order of St. Augustine in 1856, made his religious profession in 1857, and in 1858 was ordained priest. He studied Oriental languages, especially Arabic and Coptic.

Pope Leo XIII entrusted to him several delicate missions. In his order, besides being professor of dogmatic theology, Sacred Scriptures and the Oriental languages, Ciasca also held the positions of prefect of studies, assistant general, and afterwards of procurator general.

In 1866, he obtained the chair of Hebrew in the College of Propaganda, and later took part in the First Vatican Council in the quality of theologian and as interpreter for the Oriental bishops. He also occupied the following positions: consultor of the Congregation of Propaganda for the affairs of Oriental Rites (1872); writer in the Vatican Library for Arabic (1876); pontifical interpreter at the Congregation of Propaganda; ordinary censor of Oriental books and professor of Oriental languages in the Roman Seminary (1878); dean of the faculties of Oriental languages and theology in the same seminary, and president of the college of interpreters at the Propaganda (1882); consultor of the Holy Office (1889).

In 1891, he was created Titular Archbishop of Larissa with the appointment to the office of prefect of the Vatican Archives; in the same year, he was sent by the Holy See to preside over the Ruthenian synod at Lemberg. In 1892, he was named pro-secretary of the Congregation of Propaganda (1893). He was elevated to Cardinalate at the secret consistory of 19 June 1899, and given the titular church of San Callisto.

== Works ==
He published (1885–89) the extant fragments of a very ancient Coptic version of the Old Testament, from manuscripts in the Borgia (Propaganda) Museum. He discovered and edited (1888) of an Arabic version of the Diatessaron of Tatian, a text of importance for the history of the Canon of the New Testament (cf. M. Maher, "Recent Evidence for the authenticity of the Gospel: Tatian's Diatessaron", London, 1903).

His own principal works are:

- "Examen Critico-Apologeticum super Constitutionem Dogmaticam de Fide Catholica editam in Sessione tertia SS. Oecumenici Concilii Vaticanii", 270 pp. 8vo (Rome, 1872)
- "I Papiri Copti del Museo Borgiano della S. C. de Propaganda Fide tradotti e commentati", pamphlet of 55 pp. (Rome, 1881)
- "Sacrorum Bibliorum Framenta Copto-Sahidica Musei Borgiani", vol. I, 4to 225 pp., with 8 plates (Rome, 1885 and 1889). These two volumes deal with the Old Testament; vol. III, dealing with the New Testament (509 pp. with 40 plates) was published in 1904 by P.J. Balestri..
- "Tatiani Evangeliorum Harmoniae Arabicae nunc primum ex duplici codicae editit et latina translatione donavit. . ." in 4to, 108 pp. (Rome, 1888).

== Notes ==
Preceded by	Archivist of the Holy Roman Church; 19 May 1891 - 4 July 1893	Succeeded by Luigi Cardinal Galimberti
