= Nikolaus von Laun =

Very Reverend Lord, Friar Nikolaus von Laun, O.E.S.A.
- Titular Bishop of Castoria
- Archdiocese: Prince-Archbishopric of Salzburg
- Diocese: Regensburg
- Appointed: 1362/1363
- Term ended: 26 March 1371
- Other posts: Auxiliary bishop of the Diocese of Regensburg (1363-1371); Prior Provincial, O.E.S.A. (1342; 1344-1354; 1362-1363)

Personal details
- Born: ca. 1300 Louny, Kingdom of Bohemia, Holy Roman Empire
- Died: 26 March 1371 Regensburg, Holy Roman Empire
- Education: University of Paris

Nikolaus von Laun, O.E.S.A. (also known as Nicolaus de Luna and Mikuláš z Loun) was a Bohemian Augustinian friar and scholar. He served as the Prior Provincial of the large Province of Bavaria-Bohemia.

Nikolaus was one of the first Theology professors at Charles University in Prague (founded in 1348). He wrote several works in the subject area of homiletics. Between 1362 and his death in 1371 he served as a bishop.

== Life ==
Nikolaus was born in the city of Louny (Laun in German), in the Kingdom of Bohemia, about 1300. He joined the Augustinian friars in 1315 and completed his studies at the studium of the Order located at the Priory of St. Thomas in the Lesser Town of Prague, then known as the German quarter of Prague. A subsequent period at the University of Paris earned him a doctorate in theology. He then returned to Prague and began work, in 1334, as a lecturer at the Augustinian College of St Thomas there.

In 1342, and again from 1344 to 1354 and finally from 1362 till 1363, Nikolaus occupied the office of Prior Provincial of the Augustinian friars' Bavarian Province (which at the time also included Bohemia). As Provincial superior he founded several new monasteries, including one at Bělá pod Bezdězem (Weißwasser in German) in Northern Bohemia. He also campaigned for missionary activity in the Baltic region, and in 1345 Pope Clement VI granted his consent for the Baltic Augustinian Province to be added to the territories under Nikolaus' responsibility.

Nikolaus was in good standing with the Prague political establishment, and in 1344 he delivered the address "De pallio archiepisopi Arnesti" ("The mantle of Archbishop Arnesti") on the occasion of the installation of Arnošt of Pardubice as the city's first archbishop. Three years later it was Nikolaus who delivered the "Eris corona gloriae" ("To you the Crown of Glory") address when Emperor Charles IV took on the crown of Bohemia. Following the establishment by the emperor of Prague University, Nikolaus was one of the five professors initially appointed to the Faculty of Theology.

In 1362/63 Nikolaus was appointed an auxiliary bishop of the Diocese of Regensburg, becoming named the Titular Bishop of Castoria.

Among Nikolaus' written works, one entitled Super Missus es exposicio litteralis deals with the infancy narratives found in the Gospel of Luke, giving details of the birth and childhood of Jesus. He probably also wrote for relatively advanced theological students.

Nikolaus died in Regensburg on 26 March 1371.
