= Bible translations into French =

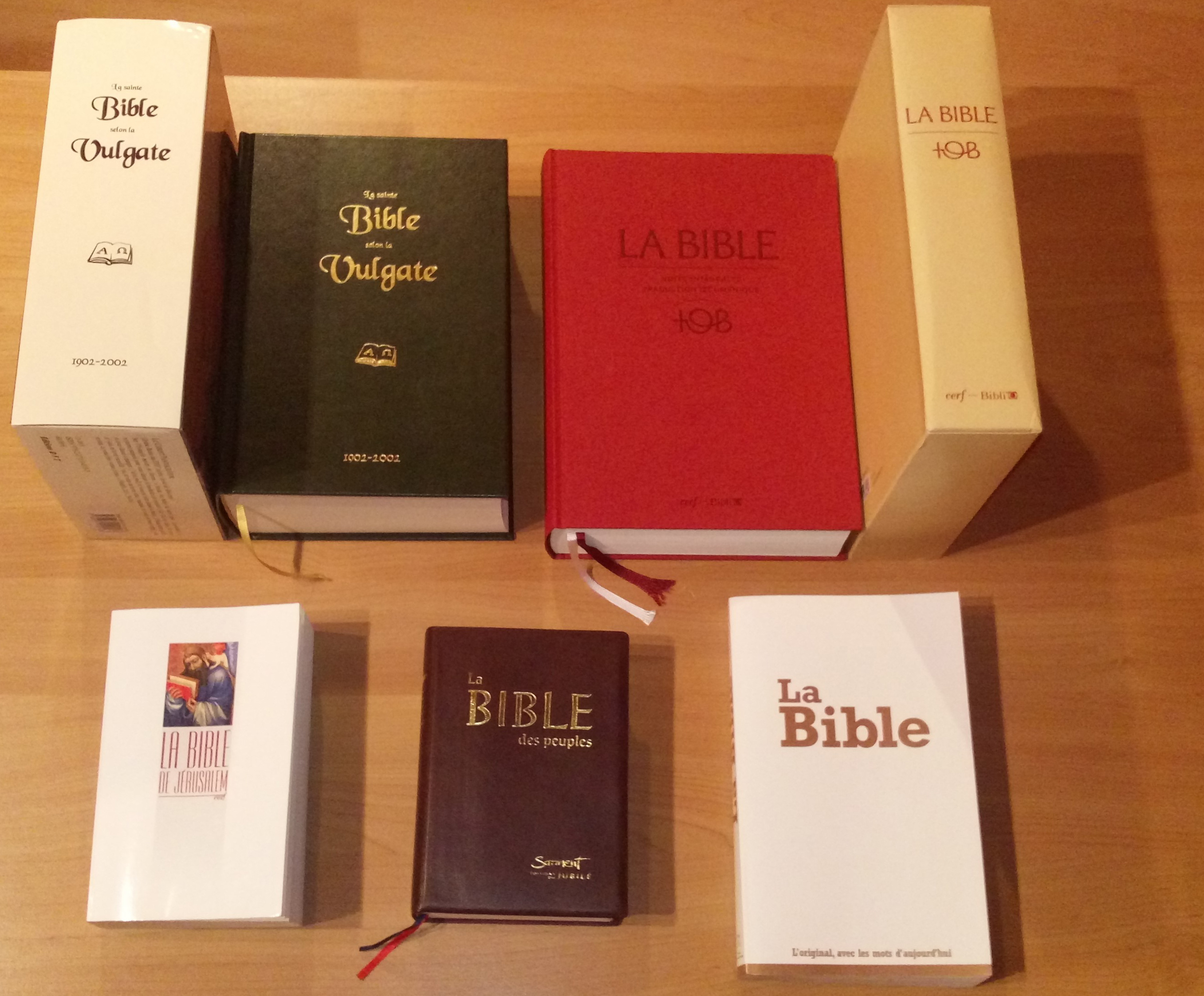
Five French bibles

Bible translations into French date back to the Medieval era. After a number of French Bible translations in the Middle Ages, the first printed translation of the Bible into French was the work of the French theologian Jacques Lefèvre d'Étaples in 1530 in Antwerp. This was substantially revised and improved in 1535 by Pierre Robert Olivétan. This Bible, in turn, became the basis of the first French Catholic Bible, published at Leuven in 1550, the work of Nicholas de Leuze and François de Larben. Finally, the Bible de Port-Royal, prepared by Antoine Lemaistre and his brother Louis Isaac Lemaistre, finished in 1695, achieved broad acceptance among both Catholics and Protestants. Jean-Frédéric Ostervald's version (1744) also enjoyed widespread popularity.

Among Catholics, the most notable contemporary French translation is La Bible de Jérusalem, available in English as The Jerusalem Bible, which appeared first in French in 1954 and was revised in 1973. This translation, and its concise footnotes and apparatus, has served as the basis for versions in many other languages besides French.

Many Francophone Protestants now use the Louis Segond version, which was finished in 1880, and revised substantially between 1975 and 1978. The Revised Louis Segond Bible is published by the American Bible Society. In 2007 the Geneva Bible Society published an updated edition of the Segond text called Segond 21. It is described by its sponsors as "L'original, avec les mots d'aujourd'hui" ("the original, with today's words").

Another modern French Bible is the Bible du semeur (Bible of the Sower), finished in 1999. This is a more thought-for-thought translation than Segond's, and it uses a more contemporary language. It is published by Biblica (formerly the International Bible Society). Another similarly translated Bible which is used by French readers is the Bible en français courant, published in 1987 by the Alliance Biblique Universelle.

The first Bible translation into French for Jews was La Bible, traduction nouvelle by Samuel Cahen, published in 1831. Later, Zadoc Kahn, chief rabbi of France, went on to lead in producing "a children's edition, Bible de la jeunesse (The Bible for Children)". Also, he led in producing La Bible du rabbinat francais (The Bible of the French rabbinate) published in 1899. The 1966 revision of this is still the chief Jewish version of the Hebrew Scriptures in French.

André Chouraqui has published a version designed for use by both Jews and Christians; though Jewish himself, he included the New Testament.

Jehovah's Witnesses have translated their Bible into French under the name La Bible. Traduction du monde nouveau (New World Translation of the Holy Scriptures); formerly it was called Les Saintes Écritures. Traduction du monde nouveau.

== Comparison ==
Translation	Genèse (Genesis) 1:1–3	Jean (John) 3:16
Louis Segond (LSG)	Au commencement, Dieu créa les cieux et la terre. La terre était informe et vide: il y avait des ténèbres à la surface de l'abîme, et l'esprit de Dieu se mouvait au-dessus des eaux. Dieu dit: Que la lumière soit! Et la lumière fut.	Car Dieu a tant aimé le monde qu'il a donné son Fils unique, afin que quiconque croit en lui ne périsse pas, mais qu'il ait la vie éternelle.
La Bible de Jérusalem (BDJ)	Au commencement, Dieu créa le ciel et la terre. Or la terre était vide et vague, les ténèbres couvraient l'abîme, un vent de Dieu tournoyait sur les eaux. Dieu dit: "Que la lumière soit" et la lumière fut.	Car Dieu a tant aimé le monde qu'il a donné son Fils unique, afin que quiconque croit en lui ne se perde pas, mais ait la vie éternelle.
La Bible du Semeur (BDS)	Au commencement, Dieu créa le ciel et la terre. Or, la terre était alors informe et vide. Les ténèbres couvraient l'abîme, et l'Esprit de Dieu planait au-dessus des eaux. Et Dieu dit alors: Que la lumière soit! Et la lumière fut.	Oui, Dieu a tant aimé le monde qu'il a donné son Fils, son unique, pour que tous ceux qui placent leur confiance en lui échappent à la perdition et qu'ils aient la vie éternelle.
Bible en français courant (BFC)	Au commencement Dieu créa le ciel et la terre. La terre était sans forme et vide, et l'obscurité couvrait l'océan primitif. Le souffle de Dieu se déplaçait à la surface de l'eau. Alors Dieu dit : « Que la lumière paraisse ! » et la lumière parut.	Car Dieu a tellement aimé le monde qu'il a donné son Fils unique, afin que quiconque croit en lui ne soit pas perdu mais qu'il ait la vie éternelle.

== Chronological list ==
=== Manuscript translations ===
- 1226–1250, translation of Jean le Bon of the University of Paris. Unfinished and continued in the 14th century by Jean de Sy and the Dominicans, Jehan Nicolas, Guillaume Vivien, and Jehan de Chambly.
- 1250–1254, the Acre Bible, anonymous translation of part of the Old Testament, exists in two illustrated copies and contains the earliest Western vernacular translation of Job.
- 1297 the Bible historiale of Guyart Desmoulins or Guyart des Moulins. Consisting of the Historia Scholastica of Petrus Comestor, a liberal translation of most of the Bible, and an assemblage of glosses and other materials from several sources. The content of the manuscripts is variable, and successive versions seem to add books of the Bible which were missing in Guyart's original.
- 1377, Bible de Charles V. Translation by Raoul de Presles dedicated to Charles V.

=== Printed translations ===
==== 15th century ====
- 1476, Nouveau Testament. Printed by Barthélemy Buyer in Lyon, translated from the Vulgate.
- 1487, Bible of Jean de Rély. Printed for the first time in Paris and reprinted at least ten times in the fifty years that followed. It is an illustrated Bible, published from a late manuscript of the Bible historiale of Guyart des Moulins.

==== 16th century ====
- 1523, Nouveau Testament by Jacques Lefèvre d'Étaples.
- 1528, Ancien Testament by Jacques Lefèvre d'Étaples. From the Vulgate, printed in Antwerp 1530, 1534, 1541. Revised by Nicolas de Leuze (Antwerp, 1548). This is the first complete translation of the Hebrew scriptures into French.
- 1535, Bible d'Olivétan: first translation made from the original Hebrew and Greek. It introduced the expression l'Éternel (the Eternal) to render the Tetragrammaton. Pierre Robert, called Olivétan, who was probably a cousin of John Calvin, wrote the Latin preface. The translation is accompanied by numerous scholarly notes. The New Testament follows the Textus Receptus.
- 1543, Cinquante psaumes avec mélodies: anonymous translation of Psalms by Clément Marot.
- 1555, Castellio Bible, translated from the Hebrew and Greek by Sebastian Castellion. Condemned by John Calvin.
- 1560, Bible de Genève of Jean Calvin: follows the Bible d'Olivétan.
- 1588, Revision of the Bible de Genève by Theodore Beza and Corneille Bertram.
- 1550‑1608, Bible de Louvain: essentially a revision of the Bible of Lefebvre d'Étaples.
- 1566, traduction de René Benoist: from the Vulgate (Paris). Suspected of Calvinism, it caused numerous controversies.

==== 17th century ====
- 1667, Nouveau Testament of Antoine and Isaac Lemaître de Sacy: from the Greek. Printed in Amsterdam.
- 1696, Translation of the whole Bible by the Jansenist abbey of Port-Royal de Paris, translated between 1657 and 1696. Blaise Pascal and other influential writers such as Robert Arnauld d'Andilly, Pierre Nicole, and Pierre Thomas du Fossé participated in the translation under the leadership of Louis-Isaac Lemaistre de Sacy.
- 1696, Le Nouveau Testament by David Martin: revision of the Bible de Genève accompanied by notes.

==== 18th century ====
- 1702, New Testament of Richard Simon, an Oratorian who devoted his life to many works of exegesis and critical research on the Bible text. He was knowledgeable in Greek, Hebrew, and Aramaic (the language spoken by Christ), and in traditional Jewish methods of exegesis.
- 1707, La Sainte Bible by David Martin: revision of the Bible de Genève accompanied by notes. Available online at Martin 1707
- 1741, Bible of Charles de Cène, a pastor and refugee in the Dutch Republic.
- 1736, revision of David Martin's bible by the pastor Pierre Roques.
- 1744, revision by Jean-Frédéric Osterwald of the Bible de Genève.

==== 19th century ====
- 1820–1824, Sainte Bible (traduction nouvelle), by Antoine Eugène Genoud (also known as the abbot of Genoude), Paris, Imprimerie royale.
- 1831–1851, La Bible, Traduction Nouvelle by Samuel Cahen: Jewish Bible, Hebrew and French bilingual edition.
- 1843, Sainte Bible by Jean-Jacques Bourassé and Pierre Désiré Janvier, also called Bible de Tours, translated from the Vulgate. Published in 1866 in a deluxe version illustrated by Gustave Doré, re-edited in 1985 by Jean de Bonnot.
- 1846, translation of the Gospels by Felicite Robert de Lamennais. It is this text that was read by, notably, Victor Hugo and Arthur Rimbaud.
- 1847, Ancien Testament, H.-A. Perret-Gentil: in 2 volumes, following the Hebrew text.
- 1855, Revision of La Sainte Bible of David Martin.
- 1859, La Sainte Bible of John Nelson Darby (originator of dispensationalism): from the Greek and Hebrew. Darby also translated the Bible into English and German. Very literal.
- 1860, Ancien Testament by Lazare Wogue: with the collaboration of Ben Baruk de Crehange, or B. Mosse of Avignon.
- 1872, the Nouveau Testament by Jean-Hugues Oltramare, who has the distinction of giving in his notes all Greek variants in Nestle-Aland and weighing them.
- 1872, Ancien Testament by Pierre Giguet: translated from the Septuagint.
- 1873, La Sainte Bible by Jean Baptiste Glaire, commentary by F. Vigouroux: translated from the Vulgate.
- 1874, L'Ancien Testament by Louis Segond.
- 1877, Nouveau Testament selon la Vulgate: translated into French with notes by Jean Baptiste Glaire.
- 1877, La Sainte Bible by Ostervald.
- 1880, Le Nouveau Testament and La Bible by Louis Segond : the original version is no longer readily available since it underwent a revision in 1910 (after the death of Louis Segond). The new version (Segond-1910) was (and still is) the most widely used by French Protestants.
- 1881, Bible de Reus by Edouard Antoine Reus, inspired by German translations.
- 1881, Sainte Bible by Antoine Arnaud, from the Vulgate, intended for seminarians.
- 1885, Ancien Testament by John Nelson Darby (originator of dispensationalism): from Hebrew and without scientific pretensions but with the desire to render the original language as literally as possible.
- 1886–1896, Bible rationaliste by Eugène Ledrain: from the Hebrew and Greek texts, Paris.
- 1887, Les Saints Évangiles, traduction nouvelle by Henri Lasserre. Received an imprimatur.
- 1899, L'Ancien et le Nouveau Testament with a French translation in the form of a paraphrase by R.P. de Carrières and commentary by Ménochius of the Jesuits.
- 1900, La Bible annotée: translation and commentary of the Old Testament; collective work by a group of theologians in Neuchatel, under the direction of Frederic Godet (translation by Felix Bovet).

==== 20th century ====
- 1902, La Bible du Rabbinat by Zadoc Kahn, with numerous collaborators. Published as a bilingual Hebrew–French edition.
- 1910. Bible Louis Segond.
- 1923, Bible Crampon. Chart of liturgical readings from the Epistles and Gospels, maps and plans.
- 1956, La Bible de Jérusalem. French translation done under the leadership of the École biblique de Jérusalem seeking exegetical rigor as well as an elegant style. Revised versions were released in 1973 and 1998.
- 1976, Traduction œcuménique de la Bible (TOB). Ecumenical Translation of the Bible by Catholics and Protestants.
- 1978. Segond Révisée (Colombe) (SER)
- 1995, Les Saintes Écritures. Traduction du monde nouveau. Based on the English 1984 edition of the New World Translation of the Holy Scriptures. Produced and published by Jehovah's Witnesses.
- 1996. Bible Ostervald. A revision of the Ostervald text, popular among francophone Protestants in the 19th century.
- 1997, La Bible en Français Courant (FC). A new, revised edition of the Universal Biblical Alliance's 1982 French translation.
- 1999, La Bible du Semeur.

==== 21st century ====
- 2001, La Bible, by André Chouraqui. A translation which attempts to transcribe the play on words or the etymology of the words of Biblical languages.
- 2002, La Nouvelle Bible Segond.
- 2010, Traduction oecuménique de la Bible (TOB 2010). Ecumenical Translation of the Bible by Catholics and Protestants.
- 2013, La Bible: traduction officielle liturgique coordinated by Father Henri Delhougne, O.S.B., with numerous collaborators.
- 2017, Bible Parole de Vie (PDV). Word of Life version.
- 2018, La Bible. Traduction du monde nouveau. Based on the English 2013 revision of the New World Translation of the Holy Scriptures. Produced and published by Jehovah's Witnesses.
- 2019, Nouvelle Français Courant (NFC): a revision in modern French.

== See also ==
- Bible translations into German
- Traduction œcuménique de la Bible
- Bible translations into the languages of France
