= Bible translations in the Middle Ages =

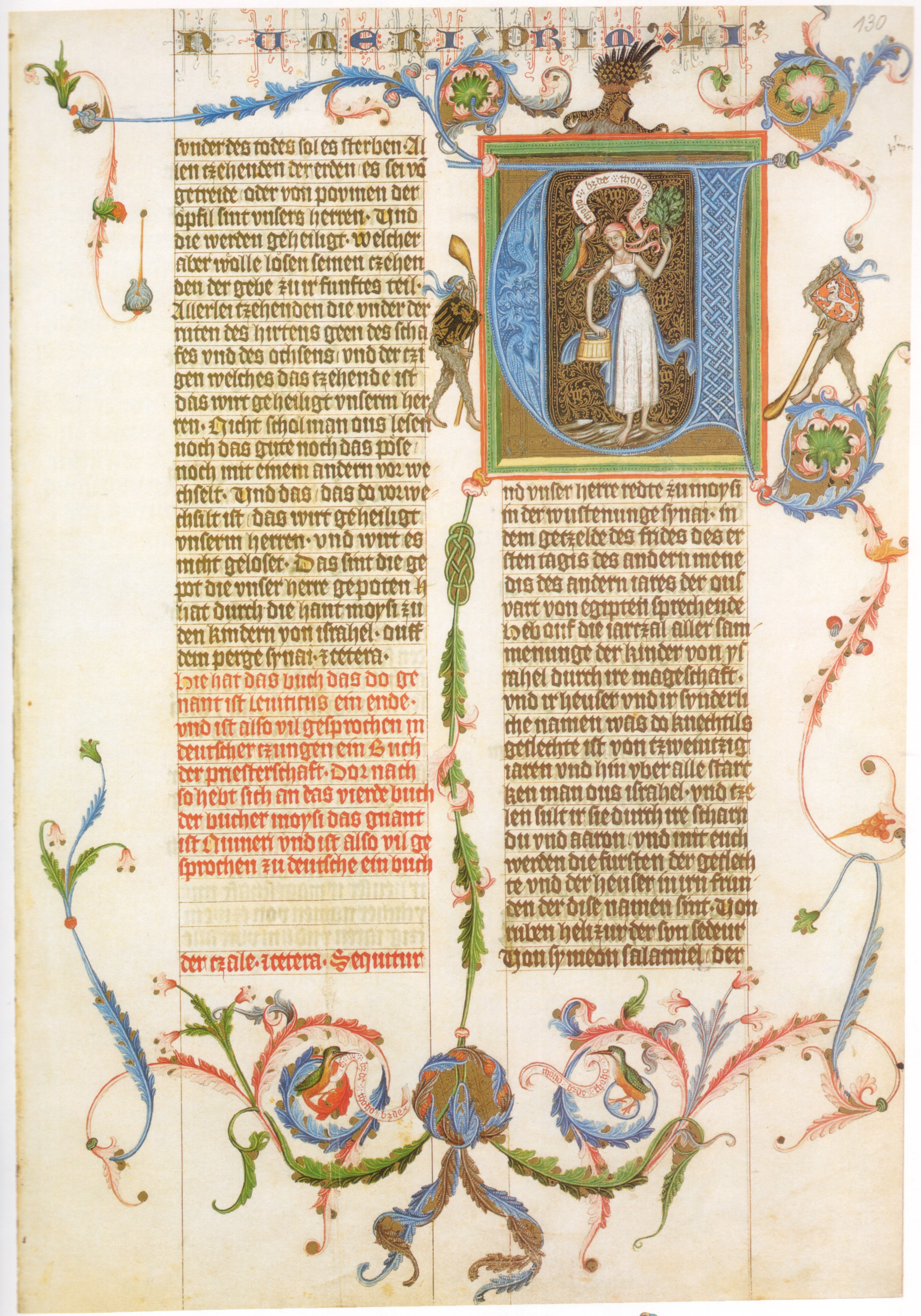
A page from the luxury illuminated manuscript Wenceslas Bible, a German translation of the 1390s.

Bible translations in the Middle Ages went through several phases, all using the Vulgate. In the Early Middle Ages, written translations tended to be associated with royal or episcopal patronage, or with glosses on Latin texts; in the High Middle Ages with monasteries and universities; in the Late Middle Ages, with lay and priestly uses to study the daily or weekly liturgical readings, especially with the advent of printing. Some popular movements caused, when the movement were associated with violence, official crackdowns on various kinds of vernacular scripture in Spain, England and France.

== Terminology ==
- Vernacular: the native language of a community, such as Middle English; tending to be non-literate, evolving, borrowing and part of a dialect continuum, perhaps without a sophisticated vocabulary for abstract ideas.
- Lingua franca: a well-known bridge language between language groups, including trade languages, such as koine Greek, but prone to being superseded as economic patterns change. When a text is available in the lingua franca there may be little demand for or benefit from a vernacular translation.
- Official language: the language used in or by officialdom, such as Roman era Latin; tending to change slowly over time and with a large abstract vocabulary. When a text is available in the official language, there may be little patronage available to fund the translation and expensive production of a vernacular translation.
- Sacred or liturgical language: a language used for sacred purposes, not in common use, and tending to be quite stable over centuries or millennia.

In the modern core Anglosphere nations, English is typically the vernacular, the official language, and a lingua franca, though (especially for Protestants) there is no sacred language. Sacred languages may start as vernaculars, then go through various levels of solidification. Biblical translations into vernacular languages often rely on previous translations in the same language or language group.

== Classical and Late Antiquity translations ==
By the end of late antiquity the written Bible was available and used in all the major written languages then spoken by Christians.

=== Greek texts and versions ===
The Old Testament was originally written in Hebrew (with parts of Nehemiah and Daniel in Aramaic). In the 3rd or 2nd century BC, the Septuagint (Note: abbreviated as LXX) translation of the Old Testament into Koine Greek was completed in Alexandria, Egypt and thenceforth used by Jews who spoke Greek as their primary language. The Septuagint also included most of the deuterocanonical books. After various updates, it was probably completed in the 3rd century AD. The earliest complete copies of the Septuagint, Codex Sinaiticus and Codex Vaticanus, are from the 4th century CE. As of the early twenty-first century, the Septuagint remains in use in the Greek Orthodox Church.

Although Western scholarship has traditionally held that the New Testament was originally written in Greek, advocates of Aramaic original New Testament theory rather hold that the entire New Testament was originally written in Aramaic and that the Greek versions are translations of the Peshitta text. Others hold mixed views. For example, in his revision of the Douay-Rheims Bible, Bishop Challoner states that Saint Matthew originally wrote his Gospel in Aramaic but accepts that most of the rest of the New Testament was originally written in Greek.

The whole written Christian Bible, including the deuterocanonical books, was available in Koine Greek by about 100 AD, as were numerous apocryphal Gospels. The process by which bishops discerned the Biblical canon continued for centuries. Some variations have always remained between different Churches.

=== Other early versions ===
The Bible was translated into various languages in late antiquity; including Coptic, Gothic, the Ge'ez language of Ethiopia and Latin, then later into Armenian, Georgian, and Old Nubian.

At the end of this period (c700s), Church of the East monasteries (so-called Nestorians) had translated the New Testament and Psalms (at least, the portions needed for liturgical use) from Syriac to Sogdian, the lingua franca in Central Asia of the Silk Road, which was an Eastern Iranian language with Chinese loanwords, written in letters and logograms derived from Aramaic script.

=== Vetus Latina, or the Old Latin ===
The earliest Latin translations are collectively known as the Vetus Latina. These Old Latin translations date from at least the early fourth century, and exhibit a great number of minor variations. Usage of the Vetus Latina as the backbone of the church and liturgy continued well into the Twelfth Century. Perhaps the most complete, and certainly the largest surviving example is Codex Gigas, which can be seen in its entirety online. Housed in the National Library of Sweden, the massive Bible opens with the Five Books of Moses and ends with Third Book of Kings.

=== Latin Vulgate ===
In the late fourth century, Jerome re-translated the Hebrew and Greek texts into the normal vernacular Latin of his day, in a version known as the Vulgate (Biblia vulgata) (meaning "common version", in the sense of "popular").

The Old Testament books are Jerome's translation from the Hebrew, Aramaic and Greek. The New Testament books are rescensions of Vetus Latina versions: the Gospels by Jerome with reference to some Greek and Aramaic versions, and the other parts perhaps by a Rufinas.

When Jerome's revision was read aloud in the churches in North Africa, riots and protests erupted since the new readings differed in phraseology from the more familiar reading in the Vetus Latina.

Jerome's translation gradually replaced most of the older Latin texts, and also gradually ceased to be a vernacular version as the Latin language developed and divided. The earliest surviving complete manuscript of the entire Latin Bible is the Codex Amiatinus, produced in eighth century England at the double monastery of Wearmouth-Jarrow. Jerome's Latin Vulgate did not take complete traction among the churches in the West until the time of Charlemagne, when he sought to standardize script, texts, and rites within Western Christendom.

== Psalms ==
The Psalms had multiple translations in Latin made for chanting, and for different rites, circulated as independent Psalters apart from the more literal semi-poetical translations in Bibles. There have been numerous Latin Psalters: Cyprianic, Vetus (at least three versions), Ambrosiana, Mozarabica, Romana (perhaps from Jerome's first minimal revision), Gallicana (perhaps from Jerome's second attempt, based on the Septuagint), and juxta Hebraicum (Jerome's last, from the Hebrew), plus two recent Catholic ones, the Piano and the Nova Vulgata.

It also has been common to create metrical semi-paraphrases of Psalms, to suit songs and metrical recitation, in cultures where this was prized, such as Middle English, and in Protestant hymnody where the words could be sung over any popular tune of the same metre. Restrictions on unauthorized new Bible translations do not seem to have applied to the Psalms.

As well as translations that attempt more satisfactory lyrical use, there are translations that do not attempt any poetic facade, such as Richard Rolle's Middle English Prose Psalter (c. 1348).

In English, the Psalms in the Book of Common Prayer come from the Coverdale Bible, not the King James Version Bible.

== Early medieval vernacular translations ==
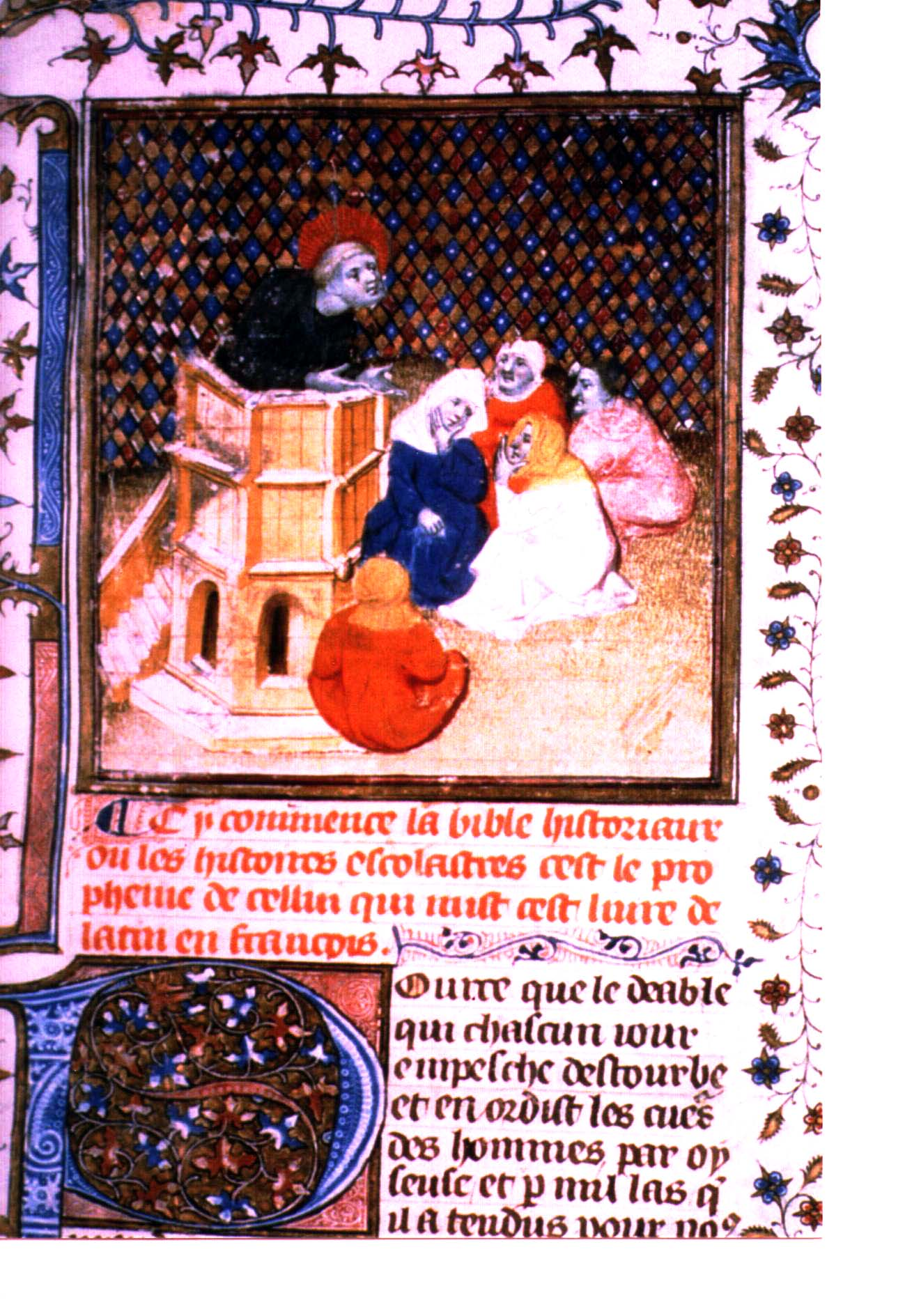
Folio 1 du Ms Ars. 5057 (Bible historiale): A (Franciscan?) preacher preaches to old ladies. "Cy commence la Bible historiaux ou les histoires escolastres. C'est le propheme de cellui qui mist cest livre de latin en francois. ~~ Pource que le Deable qui chascun jour destourbe et enordut le coeur des hommes par oyseuse (ie: "paresse") et par mille lacs (i.e.: "lacets, cordes") qu'il a tendus..."(Here begins the Bible historiale or the Historia Scholastica.~~ Because the devil, who every day troubles and soils men's hearts with sloth and by a thousand traps...)

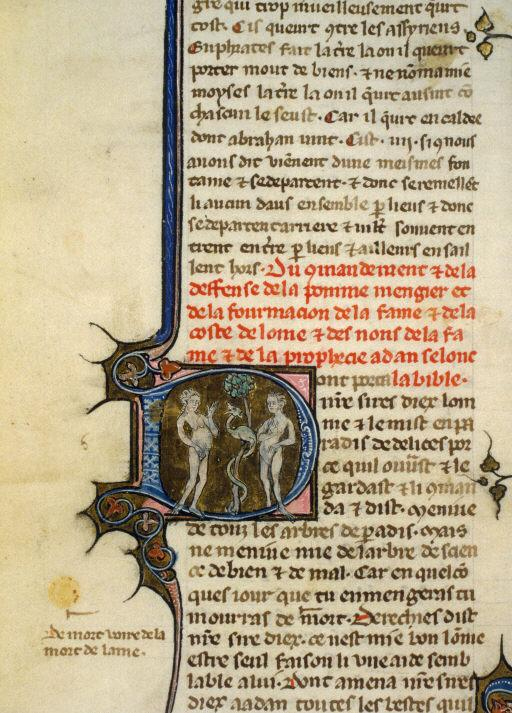
French Bible historiale of ca. 1350. Above the red text, Peter Comestor's commentary, below it the text of Genesis

During the Migration Period Christianity spread to various peoples who had not been part of the old Roman Empire, and whose languages had as yet no written form, or only a very simple one, like runes. Typically the Church itself was the first to attempt to capture these languages in written form, and Bible translations are often the oldest surviving texts in these newly-written-down languages.

Meanwhile, Latin was evolving into new distinct regional forms, the early versions of the Romance languages, for which new translations eventually became necessary. However, the Vulgate remained the authoritative text, used universally in the West for scholarship and the liturgy, matching its continued use for other purposes such as religious literature and most secular books and documents.

In the early Middle Ages, anyone who could read at all could often read Latin, even in Anglo-Saxon England, where writing in the vernacular (Old English) was more common than elsewhere. A number of pre-Reformation Old English Bible translations survive, as do many instances of glosses in the vernacular, especially in the Gospels and the Psalms. Over time, biblical translations and adaptations were produced both within and outside the church, some as personal copies for religious or lay nobility, others for liturgical or pedagogical purposes.

One early vernacular translation in mainland Europe belonged to Peter Waldo, founder of the Waldensian Movement, who translated the New Testament and a few Old Testament books into Franco-Provençal, his native language

== Oral and extemporised translation ==
The history of oral and extemporized translations or paraphrases of scripture readings at Mass has not been well studied, though they may have been the most common vernacular Gospel translations encountered by the laity throughout the Middle Ages.

In the early Middle Ages, as the Romance languages progressively diverged from Latin, lectors would read the Latin using the conventions of the local dialect. The acts of Saint Gall contain a reference to the use of a vernacular interpreter in Mass as early as the 7th century, and the 813 Council of Tours acknowledged the need for translation and encouraged such.

In the late Middle Ages, the prône portion of Pre-Tridentine Latin Mass would include such translations by the priest as needed during the vernacular homily. It was the common practice that at the beginning of the vernacular homily (sermon), the Gospel reading and perhaps the Epistle reading would be rendered loosely in the vernacular by the priest.

In a pinch, this translation could be used as the sermon itself: inability or slackness to preach in the vernacular was repeatedly regarded as a failure of a priest's or bishop's duty, but must have happened over the centuries: John Purvey quoted Robert Grosseteste:

If any priest says he cannot preach (i.e. give composed or extemporized vernacular sermons), one remedy is: resign; [...] Another remedy, if he does not want that, is: record (i.e., recollect or write out) he in the week the naked text of the Sunday's gospel, that he understands the gross story, and tell it to the people, that is if he understands Latin and does it every week of the year. And if he understands no Latin, go he to one of his neighbours that understands, which will charitably expound it to him, and thus edify he his flock[...]

— Robert Grosseteste, Bishop of Lincoln, Scriptum est de Levitis (c. 1240)

== Factors promoting and inhibiting vernacular translations ==
Translations came relatively late in the history of many of the European vernacular languages. They were rare in peripheral areas and with languages in flux that did not have vocabularies suitable to translate biblical terms, things and phrases. According to the Cambridge History of the Bible, this was mainly because "the vernacular appeared simply and totally inadequate. Its use, it would seem, could end only in a complete enfeeblement of meaning and a general abasement of values. Not until a vernacular is seen to possess relevance and resources, and, above all, has acquired a significant cultural prestige, can we look for acceptable and successful translation."

The cost of commissioning written translations and producing such a large work in manuscript was also a factor; the three copies of the Vulgate produced in 7th century Northumbria, of which the Codex Amiatinus is the only survivor, are estimated to have required the skins of 1,600 calves. Manuscript copies of the Bible historiale and, even more so, the usually lushly illuminated Bible moralisée were large, deluxe manuscripts, which only the wealthiest nobility (such as the French royal family) could afford.

Nevertheless, recent studies of 600 inventories of medieval Italian private libraries, "vernacular Bibles, in particular Gospels, were a constant feature in the libraries of lay people, and not only in the regions known for their high literacy levels, such as Florence and Tuscany," according to historian Sabrina Corbellini.

In the 12th and 13th centuries, particular demand for vernacular translations came from groups outside the Roman Catholic Church such as the Waldensians, and Cathars. This was probably related to the increased urbanization of the 12th century, as well as increased literacy among educated urban populations.

=== Innocent III ===
Church attitudes toward written translations varied by the translation, the date and location, but is controversial.

A well-known group of letters from Pope Innocent III to the diocese of Metz (c.1200), where the Waldensians were active, was sometimes taken by post-Reformation scholars as evidence that Bible translations were forbidden by the church, especially since Innocent's first letter was later supposedly incorporated into canon law.

Margaret Deanesly's study of this matter in 1920 was influential in maintaining this notion for many years, but later scholars have challenged its conclusions. Leonard Boyle has argued that, on the contrary, Innocent was not particularly concerned with the translations, but rather with their use by unauthorized and uneducated preachers. "There is not in fact the slightest hint that Innocent ever spoke in any way, hypothetically or not, of suppressing the translations at all." The 13th-century chronicler Alberic of Trois Fontaines does say that translations were burned in Metz in 1200, and Deanesly understood this to mean it was ordered by Innocent in his letters from the previous year, but Boyle pointed out that nowhere in the letters did Innocent actually prohibit the translations.

While the documents are inconclusive about the fate of the specific translations in question and their users, Innocent’s general remarks suggest a rather permissive attitude toward translations and vernacular commentaries provided that they are produced and used within the scope of Christian teachings or with church oversight.

=== Regional bans ===
There is no evidence of any official decision in the Medieval era to universally disallow translations following the incident at Metz. It was not controversial to teach, as Dominican friar Jacopo Passavanti (c.1350) did, that "every Christian, according to his position and education is supposed to acquire knowledge of the Holy Writ” whether by reading or listening.

In 1417, influential Paris theologian Jean Gerson asked the Council of Constance to ban public unauthorized reading of vernacular scriptures across the entire Church, but gained no traction at the Council.

However, some specific translations were condemned, and bans were imposed in some regions following assassinations or revolts.

- During the Albigensian Crusade: Toulouse in 1229, Taragona in 1234 and Beziers in 1246. Pope Gregory IX incorporated Innocent III’s letter into his Decretals and instituted these bans presumably with the Cathars in mind as well as the Waldensians, who continued to preach using their own translations, spreading into Spain and Italy, as well as the Holy Roman Empire.
- In England in the 1400s, production of new translations of the Bible, public reading of unauthorised versions, and any texts containing Lollard polemic (as some Wycliffean Bibles did) was banned in England under a variety of state and church laws such as the Oxford Constitutions.

As Rosemarie Potz McGerr has argued, as a general pattern, bans on translation responded to the threat of strong heretical movements; in the absence of viable heresies, a variety of translations and vernacular adaptations flourished between the twelfth and fifteenth centuries with no documented institutional opposition at all.

By the Council of Trent the Reformation challenged the Catholic Church, and the "rediscovery" of the Greek New Testament presented new opportunities for divergent renditions by translators, so the issue of unauthorised vernacular Bible reading came to the foreground, with cardinals from Romance-language backgrounds (i.e. France, Spain, Italy) generally believing that the vernacular was not important, while cardinals from non-Romance-language regions supporting vernacular study (the "beer-wine" split).

=== Accessibility ===
Recent scholarship has tended to challenge earlier historical narratives of the impossibility for late Medieval lay people to access biblical material in their vernacular, even if they were literate. In the early 1990s, historians such as Sabrina Cobellini, discussing a corpus of over a thousand extant medieval vernacular Scripture manuscripts, identified five such narratives as quite pervasive among scholars of particular Western European nationalities, which she suggests all downplay contrary evidence of grass-roots lay distribution and use:

- a (French) "Republican paradigm", coloured by commonplaces against the ancien régime, views scriptural books as necessarily luxury items, pandects read by the high aristocracy only;
- a (German) "Protestant paradigm" that emphasizes alleged deficiencies in the pre-Protestant material: incompleteness, translation quality, limited access, liturgical apparatus, illegality, latinity, etc.;
  - a related "Printing paradigm" that sees printing as fundamentally assisting the spread of Protestantism, and dismisses printed vernacular scriptures before Luther
- a (Dutch) "Modern Devotion paradigm", concentrating entirely on the semi-monastic devotio moderna movement and its "one way" scripture-publishing activities, and ignoring lay distribution chains, such as confraternities, guilds, families and the middle class;
- an (Italian) "Catholic reformation paradigm", where the absence of religious books in post-Tridentine Italian households colours expectations about the pre-Tridentine period.

== Notable medieval vernacular Bibles by language, region and type ==
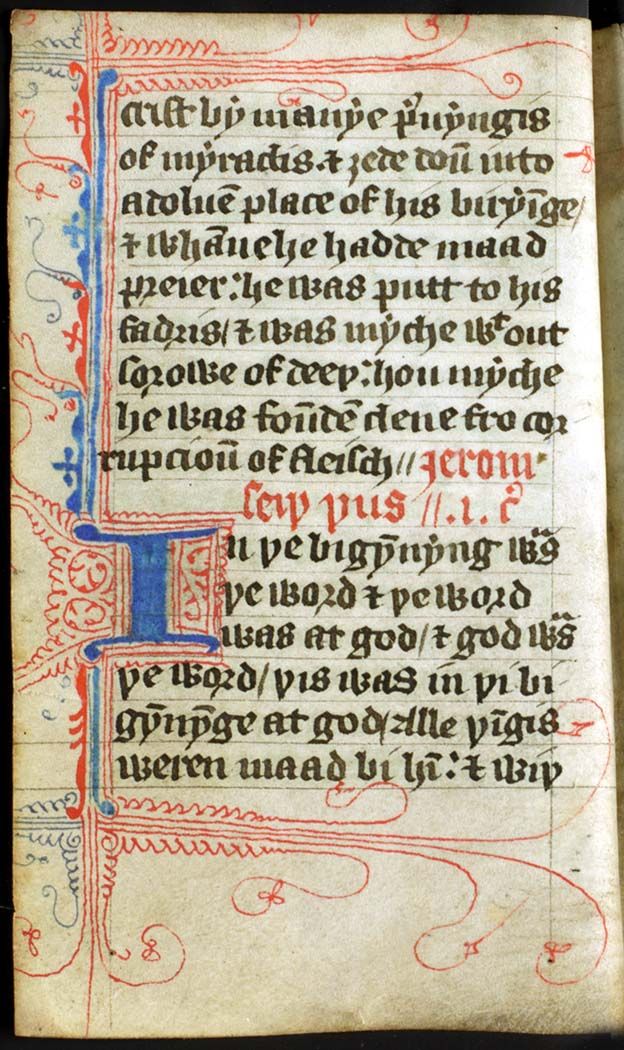
Typical Gothic pen flourishes in an unillustrated working copy of the Gospel of John in English (starts at initial), translated by John Wycliffe, late 14th century. This copy contained selections only.

The first French translation dates from the 13th century, as do the first Catalan Bible and the Spanish Biblia Alfonsina. The most notable Middle English Bible translation, Wycliffe's Bible (1383), based on the Vulgate, was banned by the Oxford Synod of 1407-08, and was associated with the movement of the Lollards, often accused of heresy. The Malermi Bible was an Italian translation printed in 1471. In 1478, there was a Catalan translation in the dialect of Valencia. The Welsh Bible and the Alba Bible, a Jewish translation into Castilian, date from the 15th century.

=== English ===
There are a number of partial Old English Bible translations (from the Latin) surviving, including the Old English Hexateuch, Wessex Gospels and the Book of Psalms, partly in prose and partly in a different verse version. Others, now missing, are referred to in other texts, notably a lost translation of the Gospel of John into Old English by the Venerable Bede, which he is said to have completed shortly before his death around the year 735. Alfred the Great had a number of passages of the Bible circulated in the vernacular about 900, and in about 970 an inter-linear translation was added in red to the Lindisfarne Gospels. These included passages from the Ten Commandments and the Pentateuch, which he prefixed to a code of laws he promulgated around this time. In approximately 990, a full and freestanding version of the four Gospels in idiomatic Old English appeared, in the West Saxon dialect; these are called the Wessex Gospels. According to the historian Victoria Thompson, "although the Church reserved Latin for the most sacred liturgical moments almost every other religious text was available in English by the eleventh century".

After the Norman Conquest, the Ormulum, produced by the Augustinian friar Orm of Lincolnshire around 1150, includes partial translations of the Gospels and Acts of the Apostles from Latin into the dialect of East Midland. The manuscript is written in the poetic meter iambic septenarius.

Richard Rolle of Hampole (or de Hampole) was an Oxford-educated hermit and writer of religious texts. In the early 14th century, he produced English glosses of Latin Bible text, including the Psalms. Rolle translated the Psalms into a Northern English dialect, but later copies were written in Southern English dialects. Around the same time, an anonymous author in the West Midlands region produced another gloss of the Psalms — the West Midland Psalms.

In the early years of the 14th century, a French copy of the Book of Revelation was anonymously translated into English, and there were English versions of various French paraphrases and moralized versions.

In the late 14th century, probably John Wycliffe and perhaps Nicholas Hereford produced the first complete Middle English language Bible. The Wycliffean Bibles were made in the last years of the 14th century, with two very different translations, the Early Version and the Late Version, the second more numerous than the first, both circulating widely.

Other incomplete translations or revisions are extant: scholars Anna Paus and Margaret Powell identified in the early 1900s independent translations of almost the entire New Testament likely no later than the Wycliffite translations, with some books available in three different versions.

=== French ===
Prior to the thirteenth century, the Narbonne school of glossators was an influential center of European Biblical translation, particularly for Jewish scholarship according to some scholars. Translations of individual books of the Bible and verse adaptations survive from the twelfth century, but the first prose Bible collections date from the mid thirteenth. These include the Acre Bible, an Old Testament produced in the Kingdom of Jerusalem, likely for King Louis IX of France, the Anglo-Norman Bible and a glossed, complete translation of the Paris Bible known simply as the “Thirteenth-Century Bible” or “Old French Bible,” often referred to by the French title “Bible du XIIIe siècle” first coined by Samuel Berger.

Completed with prologues in 1297 by Guyart des Moulins, the Bible historiale was by far the predominant medieval translation of the Bible into French throughout the fourteenth and fifteenth centuries. It translates from the Latin Vulgate significant portions from the Bible accompanied by selections from the Historia Scholastica by Peter Comestor (d. ca. 1178), a literal-historical commentary that summarizes and interprets episodes from the historical books of the Bible and situates them chronologically with respect to events from pagan history and mythology. In many copies, Guyart’s translation has been supplemented with some individual biblical books from the ‘’Bible du XIIIe siècle’’.

=== (Castilian) Spanish ===
The Biblia alfonsina, or Alfonsine Bible, is a 1280 translation of the Bible into Castilian Spanish. It represents the earliest Spanish translation of the Vulgate as well as the first translation into a European language. The work was commissioned by Alfonso X and carried out under the Toledo School of Translators. Only small fragments of the work survive today. The Biblia de Alba or Alba Bible, is a translation of the Old Testament into Castilian Spanish from Hebrew, Aramaic, and Latin. It was commissioned by John II of Castile and Luis González de Guzmán, Master of the Order of Calatrava. The Alba Bible was completed between 1422 and 1433.

=== German ===
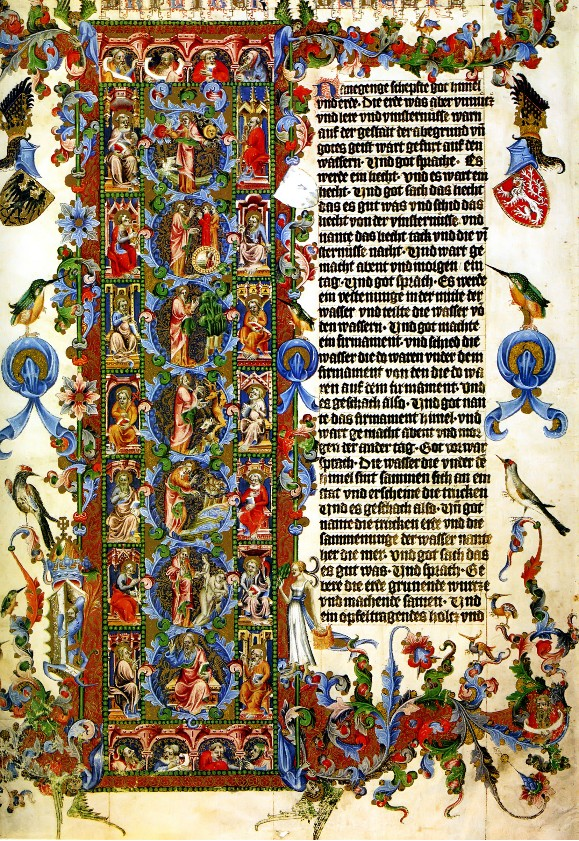
German Wenceslas Bible made for King Wenceslaus IV of Bohemia in the 1390s

An Old High German version of the Gospel of Matthew dates from 748. In the late Middle Ages, Deanesly thought that Bible translations were easier to produce in Germany, where the decentralized nature of the Empire allowed for greater religious freedom.

Altogether there were 13 known medieval German translations before the Luther Bible, including in the Saxon and Lower Rhenish dialects.

In 1466, Johannes Mentelin published the first printed vernacular Bible, the Mentelin Bible in Middle High German. The Mentelin Bible was reprinted in the southern German region a further thirteen times by various printers until the Luther Bible. About 1475, Günther Zainer of Augsburg printed an illustrated German edition of the Bible, with a second edition in 1477. According to historian Wim François, "about seventy German vernacular Bible texts were printed between 1466 and 1522," eighteen of them being full Bibles.

=== Czech ===
All medieval translations of the Bible into Czech were based on the Latin Vulgate. The Psalms were translated into Czech before 1300 and the gospels followed in the first half of the 14th century. The first translation of the whole Bible into Czech was done around 1360. Until the end of the 15th century this translation was revisioned and edited three times. After 1476 the first printed Czech New Testament was published in Pilsen. In 1488 the Prague Bible was published as the oldest Czech printed Bible, thus the Czech language became the fifth language in which the entire Bible was printed (after Latin, German, Italian and Catalan).

=== Eastern Europe ===
Some fragments of the Bible were probably translated into Lithuanian when that country was converted to Christianity in the 14th century. A Hungarian Hussite Bible appeared in the mid 15th century, of which only fragments remain.

László Báthory translated the Bible into Hungarian circa 1456, but no contemporary copies have survived. However, the 16th century Jordánszky Codex is most likely a copy of Báthory's work in the 15th century.

=== Dutch ===
A Middle Dutch translation of the New Testament was completed by 1399 by John Scutken and colleagues at Windesheim. A Northern Dutch lectionary Epistles and Gospels which also included some Old Testament readings was printed in 1477, and followed by 38 subsequent editions. Various selections of Biblical books from different translations were printed, from the 1520s including more books influenced by Erasmus' or Martin Luther's efforts.

The first printed complete Bible in a Dutch language was the Middle Low German Cologne Bible of 1478-1479.

=== Other Germanic and Slavonic languages ===
The earliest translation into a vernacular European language other than Latin or Greek was the Gothic Bible, by Ulfilas, an Arian who translated from the Greek in the 4th century in Italy.

The translation into Old Church Slavonic by Cyril and Methodius dates to the late 9th century though whether Cyril had to invent the Glagolitic alphabet for the purpose remains controversial. Versions of Church Slavonic language remain the liturgical languages of the Slavic Eastern Orthodox churches, though subject to some modernization.

=== Arabic ===
In the 10th century, Saadia Gaon translated the Old Testament in Arabic. Ishaq ibn Balask of Cordoba translated the gospels into Arabic in 946. Hafs ibn Albar made a translation of the Psalms in 889.

=== Italian ===
Translations of the High Renaissance include those of Nicolò Malermi in 1471, Fra Zaccaria of Florence (New Testament, 1542) and Santi Marmochino (1543)

=== Poetic and pictorial works ===
Throughout the Middle Ages, Bible stories were always known in the vernacular through prose and poetic adaptations, usually greatly shortened and freely reworked, especially to include typological comparisons between Old and New Testaments. Some parts of the Bible stories were paraphrased in verse by Anglo-Saxon poets, e.g. Genesis and Exodus, and in French by Hermann de Valenciennes, Macé de la Charité, Jehan Malkaraume and others. Among the most popular compilations were the many varying versions of the Bible moralisée, Biblia pauperum and Speculum Humanae Salvationis. These were increasingly in the vernacular, and often illustrated. 15th-century blockbook versions could be relatively cheap, and appear in the prosperous Netherlands to have included among their target market parish priests who would use them for instruction.

=== Historical works ===
Historians also used the Bible as a source and some of their works were later translated into a vernacular language: for example Peter Comestor's popular commentaries were incorporated into Guyart des Moulins' French translation, the Bible historiale and the Middle English Genesis and Exodus, and were an important source for a vast array of biblically-themed poems and histories in a variety of languages. It was the convention of many if not most historical chronicles to begin at the Creation and include a few biblical events as well as secular ones from Roman and local history before reaching their real subject; the Anglo-Saxon Chronicle follows this convention.

== Bibliography ==
- Berger, Samuel. (1884) ‘’La Bible française au moyen âge: étude sur les plus anciennes versions de la Bible écrites en prose de langue d'oï’’l. Paris: Imprimerie nationale.
- Biller, Peter and Anne, eds. (1994). Hudson. Heresy and Literacy, 1000-1530. Cambridge Studies in Medieval Literature. Cambridge, UK: Cambridge University Press. ISBN 9780521575768
- Boyle, Leonard E. (1985) "Innocent III and Vernacular Versions of Scripture", in The Bible in the Medieval World: essays in memory of Beryl Smalley, ed. Katherine Walsh and Diana Wood, (Studies in Church History; Subsidia; 4.) Oxford: Published for the Ecclesiastical History Society by Blackwell. doi:10.1017/S0143045900003586
- Deanesly, Margaret (1920) The Lollard Bible and Other Medieval Biblical Versions. Cambridge: University Press ISBN 9780521090735
- Kienzle, Beverly Mayne (1998) "Holiness and Obedience: denouncement of twelfth-century Waldensian lay preaching", in The Devil, Heresy, and Witchcraft in the Middle Ages: Essays in Honor of Jeffrey B. Russell, ed. Alberto Ferreiro. Leiden: Brill. doi:10.1163/9789004613713_016
- Lampe, G. W. H. (1975) The Cambridge History of the Bible, vol. 2: The West from the Fathers to the Reformation. Cambridge: University Press. doi:10.2307/3163491
- Masson, Gustave (1866). “Biblical Literature in France during the Middle Ages: Peter Comestor and Guiart Desmoulins.” ‘’The Journal of Sacred Literature and Biblical Record’’ 8: 81-106.
- McGerr, Rosemarie Potz (1983). "Guyart Desmoulins, the Vernacular Master of Histories, and His Bible Historiale". Viator. 14: 211–244. doi:10.1484/J.VIATOR.2.301456.
- Nobel, Pierre (2001). “Early Biblical Translators and their Readers: the Example of the ‘’Bible d'Acre and the Bible Anglo-Normande’’.” ‘’Revue de linguistique romane ‘’66, no. 263-4 (2002): 451-472.
- Salvador, Xavier-Laurent (2007). ‘’Vérité et Écriture(s).’’ Bibliothèque de grammaire et de linguistique 25. Paris: H. Champion.
- Sneddon, Clive R. (2002). “The 'Bible Du XIIIe Siècle': Its Medieval Public in Light of its Manuscript Tradition.” ‘’Nottingham Medieval Studies’’ 46: 25-44.
- Thompson, Victoria (2004). Dying and Death in Later Anglo-Saxon England. Woodbridge, UK: The Boydell Press. ISBN 1-84383-070-1.
- Walther, Ingo F. and Wolf, Norbert (2005) Masterpieces of Illumination (Codices Illustres), Köln: Taschen ISBN 3-8228-4750-X
- Wilson, Adrian, and Wilson, Joyce Lancaster (1984) A Medieval Mirror: "Speculum humanae salvationis", 1324-1500 . Berkeley: University of California Press online edition Includes a full set of woodcut pictures with notes from the Speculum Humanae Salvationis in Chapter 6.
