= Raoul de Presles =

Raoul de Presles may refer to:

- Raoul de Presles (died 1329), lawyer
- Raoul de Presles (died 1382), author and translator, son of prec.
