= Revised New Jerusalem Bible =

2019 Catholic English translation of the Bible

- Full name: Revised New Jerusalem Bible
- Abbreviation: RNJB
- NT published: 2018
- Complete Bible published: 2019
- Textual basis: Old Testament: Biblia Hebraica Stuttgartensia with Septuagint influence. New Testament: Novum Testamentum Graece 27th edition, i.e., "NA27."
- Translation type: Formal equivalence
- Copyright: 2018, 2019 by Darton, Longman & Todd Ltd
- Religious affiliation: Catholic Church
- Genesis 1:1–3 In the beginning God created heaven and earth. Now the earth was a formless void, there was darkness over the deep, with the spirit of God sweeping over the waters. God said, 'Let there be light,' and there was light. John 3:16 For God loved the world so much that he gave his only-begotten Son, so that everyone who believes in him may not perish but may have eternal life.

The Revised New Jerusalem Bible (RNJB) is an English translation of the Catholic Bible translated by the Benedictine scholar Henry Wansbrough as an update and successor to the 1966 Jerusalem Bible and the 1985 New Jerusalem Bible.

The translation seeks to balance the fluid literary style of the original with a more formally equivalent rendering "suitable for reading out loud." Additional differences from the earlier versions include rendering the Tetragrammaton as "LORD" rather than "Yahweh", using some gender-inclusive language, converting ancient systems of measurement and timing into modern metric equivalents, and reflecting shifts in modern English usage.

The New Testament and the Psalms were first published separately by Darton, Longman & Todd in February 2018. The full Bible was released in July 2019, published by Darton, Longman & Todd in the United Kingdom and by Image in the United States. Various Catholic Bishops' conferences in the English-speaking world using lectionaries based on the original Jerusalem Bible have begun to revise them with this updated text, including the Catholic Church in Australia, New Zealand, and Ireland.

== Principles of revision ==
Henry Wansbrough presented three principles of revision in the preface to The Revised New Jerusalem Bible: that it be intelligible when read aloud, that it adhere to formal rather than dynamic equivalence, and that it use gender-neutral language. However, the translation limits the use of gender-neutral language to personal pronouns referring to people of either gender (i.e., "Blessed is one who" rather than "Blessed is he who"). In so doing, it complies with the instruction of the Congregation for the Doctrine of the Faith issued under Cardinal Ratzinger (later Pope Benedict XVI), which requires that the "natural gender of 'personae' in the Bible, including the human author of various texts where evident, must not be changed" and that the "grammatical gender of God, pagan deities, and angels according to the original texts must not be changed insofar as this is possible in the receptor language."

Whereas The New Jerusalem Bible and its predecessor The Jerusalem Bible featured the use of "Yahweh" some 6800+ times to render the Tetragrammaton, The Revised New Jerusalem Bible uses the word "LORD" in small capitals. This to conform with instructions from the Congregation for Divine Worship.

Another notable change is that it uses a modification of the Revised Grail Psalter for the Psalms rather than its own rendering.

Both The Jerusalem Bible and The New Jerusalem Bible were notable for their extensive footnotes. By comparison, the RNJB has far fewer and different notes from the previous versions, using instead the footnotes Wansbrough wrote for the 2007 CTS New Catholic Bible. The 2019 Revised New Jerusalem Bible (RNJB) Reader’s Edition is a version designed for distraction-free reading by completely removing all footnotes.

The RNJB is a translation of singular importance because it remains entirely rooted in the Catholic intellectual tradition, independent of the ecumenical and evangelical committees that dominate the American biblical landscape.

== Endorsement ==
The RNJB Bible text, introductions, and footnotes all carry the Nihil Obstat of Father John Hemer, Censor Deputatus, Appointed by the Department for Christian Life and Worship and the Imprimatur of the Archbishop George Stack, chairman, Department for Christian Life and Worship, a declaration that, for Catholics, the contents are "considered to be free from doctrinal or moral error."

== Adoption ==
In July 2021 the bishops' conferences of Australia and New Zealand stated that they would use the Revised New Jerusalem Bible as the basis for their new lectionary. Their previous lectionary had been based on the Jerusalem Bible. Stephen Lowe, the bishop of Hamilton and Secretary of the New Zealand Catholic Bishops' Conference, said that they had debated between adopting the English Standard Version Catholic Edition (ESV-CE) or the RNJB but had settled on the RNJB because it "uses inclusive language, and is based on the Jerusalem Bible translation, that is the current approved lectionary for New Zealand".

The Revised New Jerusalem Bible was authorized for use in the worship of the Episcopal Church at the 80th General Convention in 2022.

== Reception ==
Eamon Duffy, an Irish historian at Cambridge University, criticised the Revised New Jerusalem Bible for being "flaccid" and containing "casual inaccuracy" and said that "The English Standard Version is more accurate, and reads better." Sara Parvis, senior lecturer in patristics at Edinburgh University School of Divinity, disagreed that the English Standard Version is more accurate than the RNJB.

Fr. Neil Xavier O'Donoghue, a theologian, notes that while the original Jerusalem Bible had extensive footnotes, the RNJB does not. Indeed, the notes to the RNJB were originally composed by Henry Wansbrough for the CTS New Catholic Bible and are, O'Donoghue says, "squat", or relatively sparse.

Nicholas King, a tutor and fellow in New Testament studies at Campion Hall in Oxford University, observes that there are some difficulties with the translation. These include it not being translated by a committee, which raises the difficulty "that when you try to set out the Gospels synoptically, it is very difficult to reflect the Greek adequately." King also notices, in the translation, a "slight tension ... in the attitude to inclusive language in this volume."

== See also ==
- Latin Vulgate
- Douay Rheims Bible
- Divino Afflante Spiritu
- Liturgiam authenticam
- Pontifical Biblical Commission
