= Jerusalem Bible =

1966 Catholic English translation of the Bible

The Jerusalem Bible
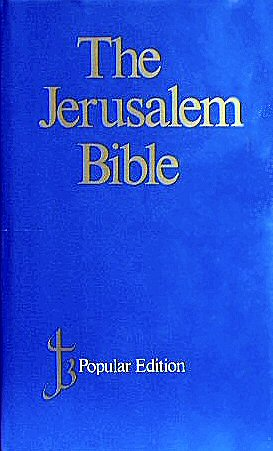
- Full name: The Jerusalem Bible
- Abbreviation: JB or TJB
- Complete Bible published: 1966
- Textual basis: Old Testament: La Bible de Jérusalem, Masoretic Text with strong Septuagint (especially in Psalms) and some Vulgate influence. New Testament: La Bible de Jérusalem, Eclectic text with high correspondence to the Nestle-Aland Novum Testamentum Graece with major variant readings from the Majority text and sacred tradition (i.e. Comma Johanneum and the longer ending of Mark) incorporated or noted. Deuterocanon: Septuagint with Vulgate influence.
- Translation type: Dynamic equivalence
- Copyright: 1966, 1968, 1998, 2019 by Darton, Longman & Todd, Ltd., and Doubleday and Co., Inc.
- Webpage: www.dltbibles.com/the-jb
- Genesis 1:1–3 In the beginning God created the heavens and the earth. Now the earth was a formless void, there was darkness over the deep, and God's spirit hovered over the water. God said, 'Let there be light', and there was light. John 3:16 Yes, God loved the world so much that he gave his only Son, so that everyone who believes in him may not be lost but may have eternal life.

The Jerusalem Bible (JB or TJB) is an English translation of the Bible published in 1966 by Darton, Longman & Todd. As a Catholic Bible, it includes 73 books: the 39 books shared with the Hebrew Bible, along with the seven deuterocanonical books, as the Old Testament, and the 27 books shared by all Christians as the New Testament. It also contains copious footnotes and introductions.

For roughly half a century, the Jerusalem Bible has been the basis of the lectionary for Mass used in Catholic worship throughout much of the English-speaking world outside of North America, though in recent years various bishops' conferences have begun to transition to newer translations, including the English Standard Version, Catholic Edition, in the United Kingdom and India and the Revised New Jerusalem Bible in Australia, New Zealand, and Ireland.

== History ==
In 1943 Pope Pius XII issued an encyclical letter, Divino afflante Spiritu, which encouraged Catholics to translate the scriptures from the Hebrew and Greek texts, rather than from Jerome's Latin Vulgate. As a result, a number of Dominicans and other scholars at the École Biblique in Jerusalem translated the scriptures into French. The product of these efforts was published as La Bible de Jérusalem in 1956.

This French translation served as the impetus for an English translation in 1966, the Jerusalem Bible. For the majority of the books, the English translation was a translation of the Hebrew and Greek texts; in passages with more than one interpretation, the interpretation chosen by the French translators is generally followed. For a small number of Old Testament books, the first draft of the English translation was made directly from the French, and then the general editor (Fr. Alexander Jones) produced a revised draft by comparing this word-for-word with the Hebrew or Aramaic texts. (Note: This is explained in the Editor's Foreword to the Jerusalem Bible.)

== Translation ==
The editor of the New Jerusalem Bible, Henry Wansbrough, claims the Jerusalem Bible "was basically a translation from the French Bible de Jérusalem, conceived primarily to convey to the English-speaking world the biblical scholarship of this French Bible. The translation of the text was originally no more than a vehicle for the notes". He also writes: "Despite claims to the contrary, it is clear that the Jerusalem Bible was translated from the French, possibly with occasional glances at the Hebrew or Greek, rather than vice versa."

The Jerusalem Bible was the first widely accepted Catholic English translation of the Bible since the Douay–Rheims Version of the 17th century. It has also been widely praised for an overall high level of scholarship, and is widely admired and sometimes used by liberal and moderate Protestants. The Jerusalem Bible is one of the versions authorized to be used in services of the Episcopal Church.

J. R. R. Tolkien translated the Book of Jonah for the Jerusalem Bible, although its final version was heavily edited, and he is listed among its "principal collaborators". (Note: On his contribution to the Jerusalem Bible, Tolkien wrote, "Naming me among the 'principal collaborators' was an undeserved courtesy on the part of the editor of the Jerusalem Bible. I was consulted on one or two points of style, and criticized some contributions of others. I was originally assigned a large amount of text to translate, but after doing some necessary preliminary work I was obliged to resign owing to pressure of other work, and only completed 'Jonah', one of the shortest books.")

=== Translation of the tetragrammaton ===
The English Jerusalem Bible returned to the practice of rendering the tetragrammaton as Yahweh for the name of God in the Old Testament, rendered as such in 6,823 places within this translation. If the French La Bible de Jerusalem of 1956 had been followed literally, this name would have been translated as "the Eternal". The move was welcomed by some.

In 2008, Cardinal Francis Arinze, Prefect of the Congregation for Divine Worship and the Discipline of the Sacraments, wrote to the presidents of all conferences of bishops at the behest of Pope Benedict XVI, stating that the use of the name Yahweh was to be dropped from Catholic Bibles in liturgical use, as well as from songs and prayers, since pronunciation of this name violates long-standing Jewish and Christian tradition.

== Updates ==
- In 1973, the French translation received an update. A third French edition was produced in 1998.
- In 1985, the English translation was completely updated. This new translation – known as the New Jerusalem Bible – was freshly translated from the original languages and not tied to any French translation (except indirectly, because it maintained many of the stylistic and interpretive choices of the French Jerusalem Bible).
- Last updated in 1998, the French La Bible de Jérusalem is currently the subject of a revision project operating under the title The Bible in its Traditions. According to the notes, more weight will be given to the Septuagint in the translation of the Hebrew Bible scriptures, though the Masoretic Text will remain the primary source. The French portion of the Demonstration Volume is available online, together with a single sample of the English translation.
- In 2007 the Catholic Truth Society published the CTS New Catholic Bible, consisting of a revision of the original 1966 Jerusalem Bible text in order to conform with the directives of the Congregation for Divine Worship and the Discipline of the Sacraments and the Pontifical Biblical Commission. The name "Yahweh" has been replaced with "the LORD" throughout the Old Testament, and the Psalms have been completely replaced with the 1963 Grail Psalter, which is used in the lectionaries of countries using the Jerusalem Bible for the base translation. The revised text is accompanied by new introductions, and textual and liturgical notes, supplemented as needed with material from the notes to the New Jerusalem Bible.
- Publisher Darton, Longman and Todd published the Revised New Jerusalem Bible in 2019. Substantially revising the JB and NJB texts, the new translation "applies formal equivalence translation for a more accurate rendering of the original scriptures, sensitivity to readable speech patterns and more inclusive language". It contains new study notes and book introductions written by Henry Wansbrough. This version replaced the Divine Name with "the LORD."

== See also ==
- Bible translations into English
- Bible translations into French
- Catholic Bible
- École Biblique
- Traduction œcuménique de la Bible
