= Palaea Historica =

Byzantine Biblical Chronicle

Palaea Historica ("Old Testament History") is an anonymous ninth century AD Byzantine chronicle which retells and expands on events in the Hebrew Bible. The Greek text of Palaea survives in manuscripts dating from the 12th to 16th centuries as well as a Slavonic translation. The work is of particular interest for biblical studies because of its recasting of Old Testament personalities such as Melchizedek, Abraham, and Moses in addition to its inclusion of extra-biblical material alluded to in the New Testament, for example Jannes and Jambres (2 Timothy 3:8) and Archangel Michael contesting for the body of Moses (Jude 1:9). It contains a version of the Story of Melchizedek.

== Text ==
The opening in Greek as in found in Vassiliev's 1893 edition reads as follows:

Ἱστορία παλαιοῦ περιέχων ἀπὸ τοῦ ᾿Αδάμ.

Πρὸ πάντων καὶ up πάντων [χαὶ] διὰ πάντων χρὴ τὸν

ἀληθῆ χριστιανὸν ἐπιγνῶναι τίς θεός χαὶ οσαχως θεός

[καὶ χατὰ τί εἴρηται θεός]. Θεὸς ὁ πατὴρ ὁ ἄναρχος...

== See also ==
- Historia scholastica
- Biblia pauperum
