= Fabian Cowper =

Dom Fabian Cowper, OSB (7 September 1931 — 13 October 1990), a monk of Ampleforth Abbey, was an English Roman Catholic monk who served as Master of St Benet's Hall, Oxford, from 1989 until his death in 1990.

== Early life ==
Born as Peter Charles Cowper in 1931 at Sandgate, Kent, one of the five children of Major Charles Deane Cowper, and his wife, Lorna, young Peter's career at Ampleforth began at St Aidan's House in September 1945. A strong athlete, he ran several times for the school in the 440 yards' sprint (the equivalent of today's 400 metres). After his schooling, he did his National Service (1949–51; Royal Army), and was then briefly articled to a firm of solicitors, but was becoming increasingly sure that his vocation was to religious life.

== Monastic vocation ==
After considering becoming a Dominican friar, he decided to pursue his religious vocation back at Ampleforth, where he entered the novitiate in 1952, taking the monastic name Fabian. He read history at St Benet's Hall, before being ordained a priest on 23 July 1961. After ordination, he taught at Ampleforth College and served as parish priest of Kirkbymoorside.

== University chaplaincies ==
In 1967, Dom Fabian was appointed assistant Roman Catholic chaplain at London University, where he served for three years before being appointed Roman Catholic chaplain at York University in 1970. From 1975 to 1977 he was Chairman of the National Conference of Catholic University Chaplains, also serving as chaplain to the Knights of Malta from 1974.

== Practice in psychotherapy ==
In 1977 he returned to London to study psychoanalysis and to qualify as a professional psychotherapist. From 1980 he practised as a professional consultant.

== Master of Saint Benet's Hall, Oxford ==
In 1989, he was appointed Master of St Benet's Hall, in succession to Dom Philip Holdsworth, who was retiring. However, soon after taking up the post, he was diagnosed with lymphoma.

== Death ==
He died in hospital in Oxford on 13 October 1990, aged 59. He was buried at Ampleforth Abbey and a memorial service was held at St James’ Church, Spanish Place on 24 November 1990.

Academic offices
Preceded by Philip Holdsworth	Master of St Benet's Hall, Oxford; 1989–1990	Succeeded by Henry Wansbrough
