= Traduction œcuménique de la Bible =

French ecumenical translation of the Bible

La Bible : traduction œcuménique
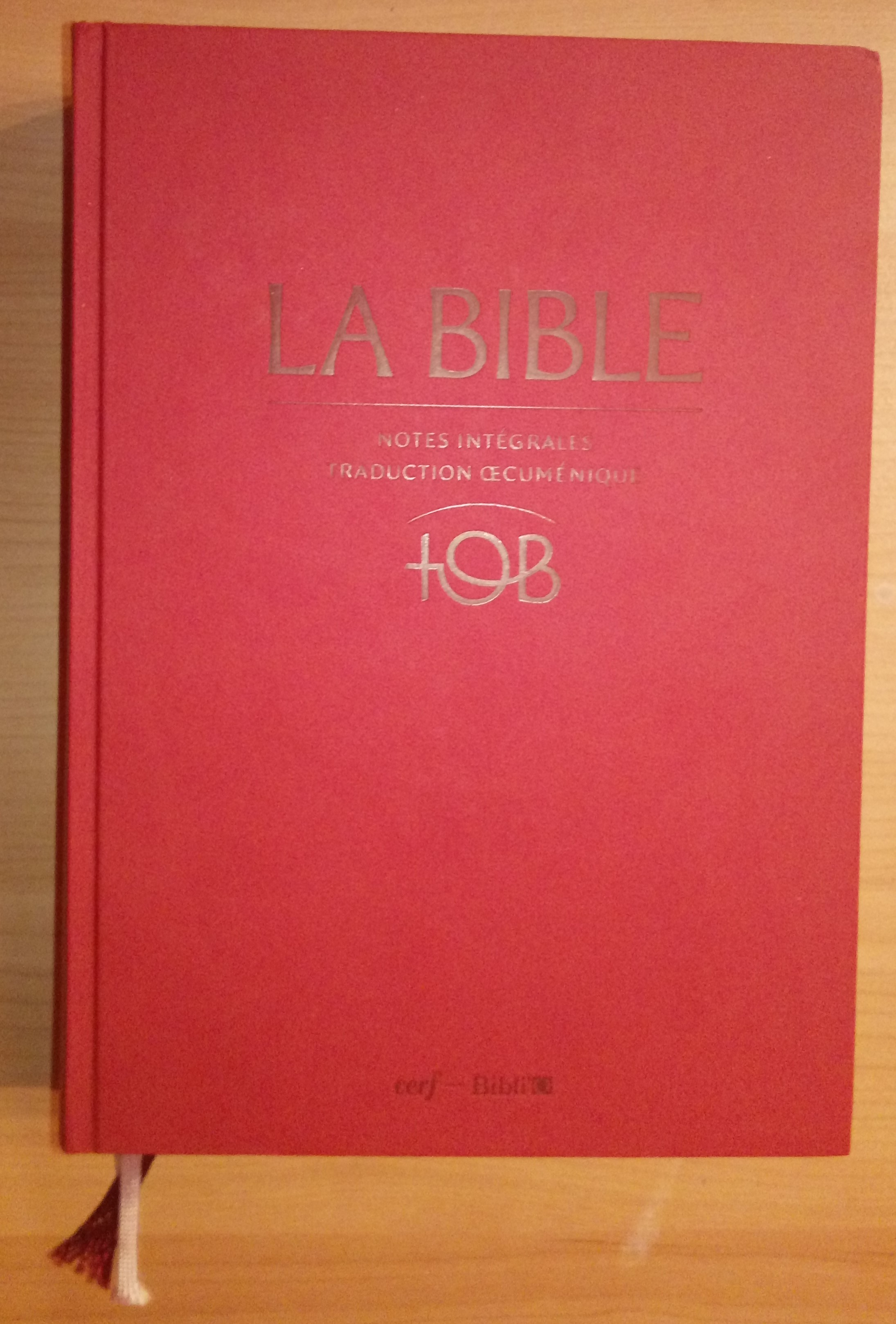
- Full name: Traduction œcuménique de la Bible
- Abbreviation: TOB
- Translation type: literal
- Copyright: Copyright 1975, 1988, 2004, 2010
- Genesis 1:1–3^{1}Commencement de la création par Dieu du ciel et de la terre. ^{2}La terre était déserte et vide, et la ténèbre à la surface de l’abîme; le souffle de Dieu planait à la surface des eaux, ^{3}et Dieu dit : « Que la lumière soit ! » Et la lumière fut. John 3:16 Dieu, en effet, a tant aimé le monde qu’il a donné son Fils, son unique, pour que tout homme qui croit en lui ne périsse pas mais ait la vie éternelle.

The Traduction œcuménique de la Bible (English: Ecumenical Translation of the Bible; abr.: TOB; full name: La Bible : traduction œcuménique) is a French ecumenical translation of the Bible, first made in 1975-1976 by Catholics and Protestants.

The project was initiated by Dominicans, and took the form of a revision of the Jerusalem Bible (Bible de Jérusalem). The TOB is published by the Éditions du Cerf and United Bible Societies.

Unlike the Jerusalem Bible, the TOB did not receive an imprimatur.

== Editions ==
=== 1975 edition ===
There was some participation by Eastern Orthodox Christians, but the effect on the 1975 edition was limited, given that the translation of the Old Testament was based on the Hebrew text rather than on the Septuagint.

=== 1988 edition ===
A first update resulted in the 1988 edition, incorporating comments and suggestions from readers and harmonizing the translation of certain words or parallel passages.

=== 2004 edition ===
In 2004, a new edition was published, containing general introductions for each of the 73 books.

=== 2010 edition ===
The launch of the TOB 2010 edition was an editorial and ecumenical event, as it contains six additional deuterocanonical books in use in the liturgy of the Orthodox Churches: 3 and 4 Ezra, 3 and 4 Maccabees, the Prayer of Manasseh and Psalm 151.

== See also ==
- Bible translations
- Bible translations into French
