= Catholic Truth Society =

Prints and publishes Catholic literature

- Founded: 1868
- Founder: Herbert Vaughan
- Country of origin: United Kingdom
- Headquarters location: London
- Distribution: Norwich Books and Music (UK); Ignatius Press (US)
- Publication types: Books
- Nonfiction topics: Catholicism
- Official website: www.ctsbooks.org

Catholic Truth Society (CTS) is a body that prints and publishes Catholic literature, including apologetics, prayerbooks, spiritual reading, and lives of saints. It is based in London, United Kingdom.

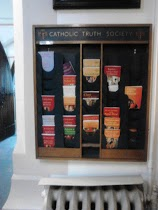
Catholic Truth Society literature stand at St Pancras Church, Ipswich

The CTS had been founded in 1868 by Cardinal Herbert Vaughan, but became defunct when he was made a bishop, since he no longer had time to devote to it. Some years later, others came up with the same idea and were directed to Vaughan, who suggested that they revive the defunct body.

Accordingly, the organisation was refounded on 5 November 1884, under the presidency of Cardinal Vaughan, with W. H. Cologan and James Britten, a layman and the principal spirit behind its refounding, serving as honorary secretaries.

== International societies ==
The Catholic Truth Society of Ireland was founded in 1899, the International Catholic Truth Society was incorporated in New York in 1900, and the Australian Catholic Truth Society was started in 1904.

== CTS in the 21st century ==
The Catholic Truth Society in the UK publishes a large range of religious booklets and leaflets on topics including Catholic apologetics, morality, doctrine, sacraments, various saints, Church history, spirituality, and prayer, as well as booklet editions of the four Gospels and other Biblical texts. The booklets are often sold inexpensively in Catholic parishes in the United Kingdom. In recent years the CTS has also diversified into study courses, Bibles, catechisms including the YouCat youth catechism, and The Compendium of the Catechism of the Catholic Church.

In 2007 the Catholic Truth Society published the "CTS New Catholic Bible", consisting of the text of the original 1966 Jerusalem Bible revised with the name "Yahweh" replaced by "the Lord" throughout the Old Testament, and the Psalms completely replaced by the 1963 Grail Psalter. This revised version presents the texts as used in Catholic Liturgy in England, Wales, and most English-speaking countries outside the United States and Canada, conforming to the directives of the Pontifical Biblical Commission. The revised text is accompanied by new introductions, textual, and liturgical notes, supplemented as needed with material from the notes to the New Jerusalem Bible.

CTS publishes the new English translation of the Roman Missal for use in Catholic parishes throughout England, Wales, Scotland and Australia, as well as the new "Divine Worship" Anglican Use liturgies to be used by formerly Anglican Catholics of the personal ordinariates around the world.

In 2014, CTS entered into a distribution agreement with Ignatius Press in the United States to "bring the famous CTS bookstands to North America." In 2017, Christian book distributor Hymns Ancient & Modern of Norwich, Norfolk announced they would distribute CTS texts for non-parish orders.
