= British and Foreign Bible Society =

Bible society founded in 1804

British and Foreign Bible Society (Bible Society)
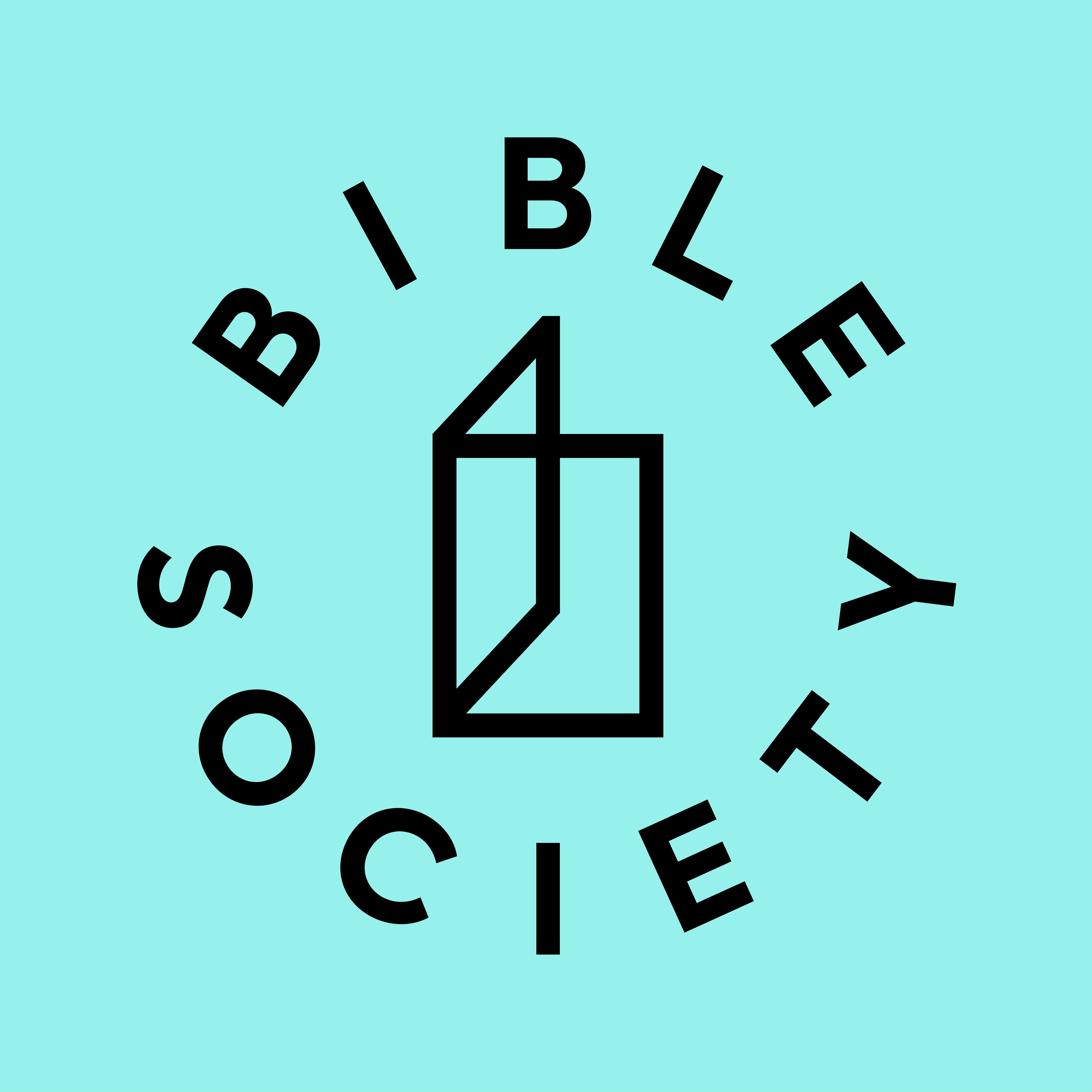
- Abbreviation: BFBS
- Formation: 1804; 222 years ago
- Purpose: Bible distribution, translation, advocacy, literacy, engagement, production
- Headquarters: Swindon, Wiltshire
- Region served: England & Wales
- Website: biblesociety.org.uk

The British and Foreign Bible Society, often known in England and Wales as simply the Bible Society, is a non-denominational Christian Bible society with charity status whose purpose is to make the Bible available throughout the world.

The Society was formed on 7 March 1804 by a group of people including William Wilberforce and Thomas Charles to encourage the "wider circulation and use" of the Scriptures.

Bibles published by the BFBS have on their front page as publisher's name the BFBS's name translated into the text's language, e.g. "Société biblique britannique et étrangère" on Louis Segond's French Bible or "Brita kaj Alilanda Biblia Societo" on the Esperanto bible compiled from L. L. Zamenhof's papers after the latter's death.

== History ==
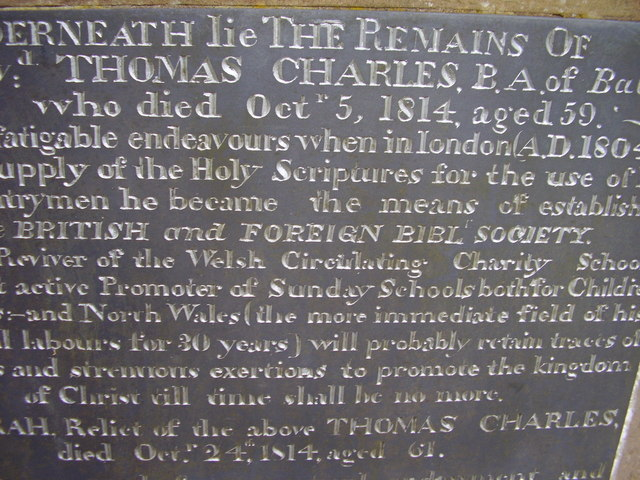
Gravestone in Wales of Thomas Charles, who helped found the BFBS

The British and Foreign Bible Society dates back to 1804 when a group of Christians, associated with the Religious Tract Society, sought to address the problem of a lack of affordable Bibles in Welsh for Welsh-speaking Christians. Many young girls had walked long distances to Thomas Charles to get copies of the Bible. Later the story was told of one of them – a young girl called Mary Jones who walked over 20 miles to get a Bible in Bala, Gwynedd.

BFBS was not the first Bible Society in the world. The first organisation in Britain to be called "The Bible Society" was founded in 1779: it still exists and is called the Naval & Military Bible Society.

The first BFBS translation project was the Gospel of John into Mohawk for Canada in 1804. In the British Isles BFBS reprinted Bibles in Welsh, Scots Gaelic and Manx Gaelic first produced by the SPCK. The first Romani translation was the Gospel of Luke (by George Borrow) into the Caló language of Iberia.

A report in the 13 November 1824 edition of the Buffalo Emporium and General Advertiser (NY), stated that the BFBS "since its establishment, has distributed 1,723,251 Bibles, and 2,529,114 Testaments—making a total of 4,252,365."

From the early days, the Society sought to be ecumenical and non-sectarian. The Controversy in 1825–26 about the Apocrypha and the Metrical Psalms resulted in the secession of the Glasgow and Edinburgh Bible Societies, which later formed what is now the Scottish Bible Society. This and another similar 1831 controversy about Unitarians holding significant Society offices resulted in a minority separating to form the Trinitarian Bible Society.

The Bible Society extended its work to England, India, Europe and beyond. Protestant communities in many European countries (such as Croatia and Albania) date back to the work of nineteenth-century BFBS Bible salesmen. Auxiliary branches were set up all over the world, which later became Bible Societies in their own right, and today operate in co-operation as part of the United Bible Societies. The Bible Society is a non-denominational Christian network which works to translate, revise, print, and distribute affordable Bibles in England and Wales.

A newspaper article in the 15 March 1879 edition of The Gazette (Montreal), noted that the total circulation by the BFBS "has been 82,000,000...during the last seventy-five years" (since 1804). By 1909 it had issued 215,000,000 copies of the Bible.

During World War One the Bible Society distributed more than nine million copies of Scripture, in over 80 languages, to combatants and prisoners of war on all sides of the war. The Bible Society managed this despite immense challenges – supply shortages, rising paper costs, paper rationing, submarine blockades and the sinking of merchant shipping.

Even greater than these physical difficulties was the emotional toll – former colleagues suddenly found themselves fighting on opposing sides. Bible salesmen throughout Europe were conscripted or volunteered into their respective armies. The Bible Society responded to the challenge. They printed New Testaments bound in khaki, stamped with a cross, for distribution via the Red Cross among sick and wounded soldiers, sailors and prisoners of war.

On average between 6–7,000 volumes were sent out every working day for fighting men, the sick and wounded, the prisoners of war, exiles and refugees. That's over four copies distributed each minute, day and night, for the duration of the war.

Translation work never stopped – between August 1914 and November 1918, the Bible Society printed Scriptures in 34 new languages and dialects. This meant on average there was one new version every seven weeks during the whole period of war.

For many years the headquarters of the society was in London; in 1972 its address was 146, Queen Victoria Street, E.C.4. By 1972 it had published or distributed whole Bibles or parts of the Bible in 1,431 languages. At that time it was distributing 173 million copies each year.

== The Society today ==
The Society is working to circulate the Scriptures across the world, in the church and through the culture.

The strategy of the Bible Society centres on Bible availability, accessibility and credibility - what it calls the 'lifecycle' of the Bible. These strategic approaches encompass all of its activity: translation, production, distribution, literacy, engagement and advocacy.

- Translation: making the Bible available in languages without the Scriptures, and revising existing Bibles to bring the language up-to-date, so that everyone can experience the Scriptures in their mother tongue. Translation is into spoken and signed languages;
- Production: printing physical copies of the Bible and producing Scriptures in different formats such as print, audio, and digital forms in order to meet the demands of the millions around the world who want a Bible of their own;
- Distribution: taking the Bible to places where it might otherwise be hard to come by, in formats that people can use;
- Literacy: helping people to read and to read well, using the Bible as a resource
- Engagement: helping people grapple with the Bible, read and respond to it wisely;
- Advocacy: giving the wider culture a reason and opportunity to encounter the joys of the Bible.

To these aims the Society was the original publisher of translations the Bible into several contemporary languages, among which Louis Segond's French Bible (1910) and L. L. Zamenhof's Bible in Esperanto (1926).

The Bible Society has by far the largest collection of Bibles in the world, with about 39,000 items. It includes its Chinese Collection which is the largest collection of Chinese Scriptures anywhere in the world. Since the society's move to Swindon in 1985 the library has been located in the library of the University of Cambridge.

== Publications ==
=== The Quiet Revival ===
In 2025, the Society published The Quiet Revival, a study based on a 2024 YouGov poll that it commissioned for England and Wales, which said that since the one earlier YouGov poll on the subject in 2018, regular church attendance (monthly or greater) had increased approximately 50%, from 8% of the population to 12%, with most of the increase among those aged 18–34.

The study's findings have been disputed. David Voas, emeritus professor of social science at University College London, called the study's findings "wholly unbelievable" and "wildly out of step with wider figures". Official attendance estimates for both the Church of England and the Catholic Church show that despite recovering since the pandemic, weekly church attendance has fallen significantly since 2019. According to the British Social Attitudes Survey, the share of adults in England and Wales who are Christian and attend church at least monthly fell from 12.2% in 2018 to 9.3% in 2023, and according to the 2022 World Values Survey, Generation Z are the most likely to identify as atheists. Revd Mark Hart, rector of St Mary's Church, Nantwich, said regarding his own church: "It would be wonderful if true, but it's out by a long way, and we're not unusual." He described instead a "steady trickle" of new church attendees. Clive Field, who works on the British Religion in Numbers project at the University of Manchester, warned that polls which rely on self-identification tend to encourage an exaggeration of religious identity and practice, also known as social-desirability bias.

Bible Society director of research and study co-author Rhiannon McAleer responded to the criticism: "We don't mind critique or robust conversations. It makes us sharper and moves everyone forward." She suggested that despite more young people coming to the church, disproportionately older congregations indicate that "significant generational decline" is to be expected.

In a blog post reporting on the study, Humanists UK wrote: "With Christian nationalism increasingly assertive in the United States, and the likes of Jordan Peterson and other pro-Christian influencers appealing to young men in particular, perhaps church attendance is seen as desirable by a growing minority of this demographic." The Church Times noted that Peterson is known for his rhetoric regarding gender roles and sex differences, in which he says men represent "order" and women "chaos". Revd Duncan Hegan, assistant curate at the traditionalist Anglo-Catholic St Alban's Church, Holborn, resisted this suspicion: "People very rarely come to church in the first instance for quote-unquote 'right reasons'." Of the mostly young male newcomers, he said: "Once they start going, they encounter Jesus, and that transforms their lives." McAleer said that she did not want the research to be "weaponised" by the far-right, and noted the increasing ethnic diversity within the church.

In March 2026, it was publicised that the YouGov research upon which The Quiet Revival was based was flawed, with the survey having been subject to fraudulent responses. The Bible Society withdrew The Quiet Revival, but published The Quiet Revival one year on: what's the story? based on further research.

According to Christian Today, despite the figures of the report by the Bible Society being flawed, churches across Britain did report "increased interest" in church attendance and conversions, particularly by young men. A similar interest was also reported to be found in the British Armed Forces according to the Royal Army Chaplains' Department.

== Where the Society works ==
The Society's mission is global. Its work is organised into two categories: domestic and international.

The Society is part of an international fellowship of over 140 Bible Societies around the world, known as the United Bible Societies. Its entire international programme is delivered on the ground through the close relationship they have with each of their fellow Bible Societies.

== See also ==
- American Bible Society
- Protestant missionary societies in China during the 19th Century
- Christian apologetics
- Ernest Tipson
- George Borrow
- 1823 Peshitta edition
- Kulish's Bible
