= Bible Historiale =

Predominant medieval translation of the Bible into French

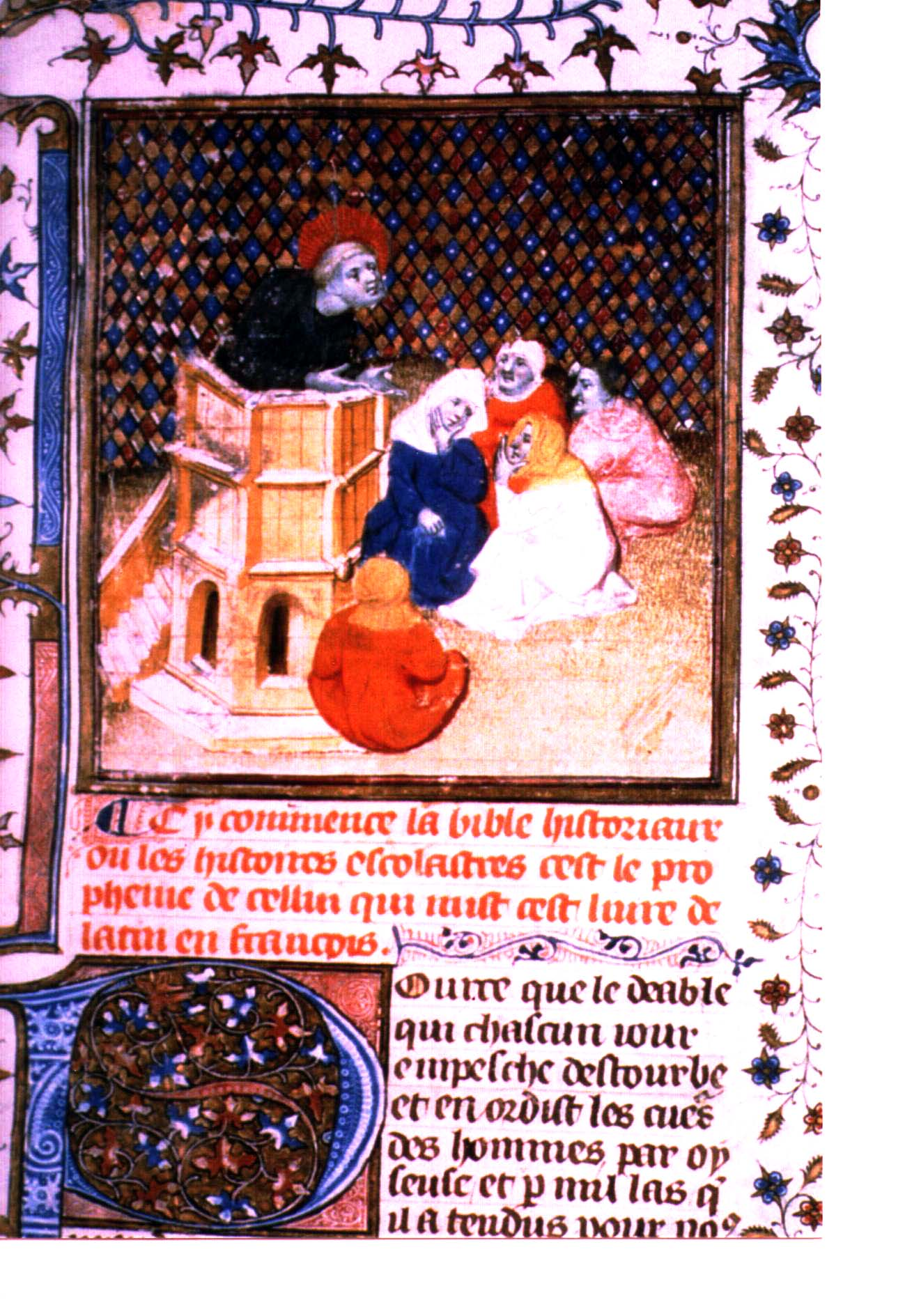
Folio 1 du Ms Ars. 5057: A preacher preaches to old ladies. "POurce que le deable qui chascun iour empesche destourbe et enordist les cuers des hommes par oyseuse (Mod. Fr.: "paresse") et par mil las (Mod. Fr.: "lacets, cordes") q'il a tendus..."(Because the devil, who every day troubles and soils men's hearts with sloth and by a thousand traps...)

The Bible Historiale was the predominant medieval translation of the Bible into French. It translates from the Latin Vulgate significant portions from the Bible accompanied by selections from the Historia Scholastica by Peter Comestor (d. c. 1178), a literal-historical commentary that summarizes and interprets episodes from the historical books of the Bible and situates them chronologically with respect to events from pagan history and mythology.

It is part of the wider phenomenon of History Bibles.

== Authorship ==
The composite work is organized into parts labeled "text", i.e. from the Bible; "gloss", offering interpretations based on the Historia Scholastica, other authoritative commentaries or the translator's own opinion; "incidents", which insert parallel histories from pagan history and mythology; and "histories", passages directly translated from Comestor's work. It was composed between 1291 and 1295 (1294 old system) by priest and canon Guyart des Moulins, who added a prologue in 1297 announcing his recent election as dean of his canonical chapter at the collegial church of Saint Pierre d'Aire-sur-la-Lys. Describing his own role as translating and "ordering" the text, Guyart censored or omitted portions of the Bible that "should not, according to reason, be translated", rearranged materials "so that the laity might find them better ordered" and, on occasion, added further commentaries of his own or from other sources to produce the work known as the Bible Historiale in accordance with prevailing norms and expectations of Bible translation. Later scribes and compilers further revised and modified the work according to the changing priorities of readers, patrons, and the church.

== Copies ==
The work was copied in many manuscripts, of which 144 survive in whole or part, most of them richly illuminated, some with more than 300 miniatures. Genesis is typically especially heavily illustrated. In this respect, it is similar to other vernacular medieval redactions of the Bible such as the Bible moralisée, Biblia pauperum and Speculum Humanae Salvationis; it differed from these, however, in containing extended direct translations from the Bible. The French name is usually used in English, at least partly because scholars differ as to whether "Historiale" should be translated as "historical" or "historiated" (illustrated).

Contents vary tremendously among manuscript copies. Guyart des Moulins did not translate the entire Bible; he seems to have only treated the historical books of the Bible, abridged versions of Job and Proverbs and the combined Gospels, based on Peter Comestor's Historia Scholastica. As early as 1317, however, Paris book shops began adding books from other translations—mainly the one known as the Thirteenth-Century Bible or the University of Paris Bible—to expand the French Bible over several stages to conform to the canonical Vulgate. Samuel Berger categorized the manuscripts into four main families according to their contents, although many fifteenth-century copies resist categorization for their inclusion of new glosses, prologues and other additions from a variety of sources; these have been further categorized and described by Clive Sneddon. One manuscript, London, British Library Royal MS 19 D III, includes some apocryphal stories whose translation is also attributed to Guyart.

Some of the most lavish 14th- and early 15th-century manuscripts are luxury copies commissioned by bibliophile magnates or royalty; John, Duke of Berry owned at least eight, with other notable patrons including Mahaut, Countess of Artois, Joan III, Countess of Burgundy, and several kings of France, including Charles V and John II, whose first copy was captured with him at the Battle of Poitiers. King Charles VIII of France, near the end of his life, ordered it to be printed. The text for the print edition was prepared by Jean de Rély and first published by Antoine Vérard in 1496 and subsequently printed in later editions in Paris and Lyon well into the sixteenth century, even alongside a host of competing translations produced by the Protestant Reformation. It was also widely owned, in manuscript and print, in England, Flanders and modern-day Belgium, and today one may find copies in libraries around the world.

== Other versions ==
While the Bible historiale was by far the most popular medieval French translation of the Bible, it was not the first. Verse adaptations of the Bible first appeared in the latter part of the 12th century, with more or less complete prose French Bibles appearing in the mid thirteenth century. These were the "Thirteenth-Century Bible," probably completed between 1230 and 1250 at the University of Paris and the Acre Bible, written between 1250 and 1254 in the Latin Kingdom of Jerusalem. The Thirteenth-Century Bible survives in four complete or near-complete copies and a significant number of single volumes (of two) and fragments in addition to parts of it being used to supplement the Bible historiale.

== Selected bibliography ==
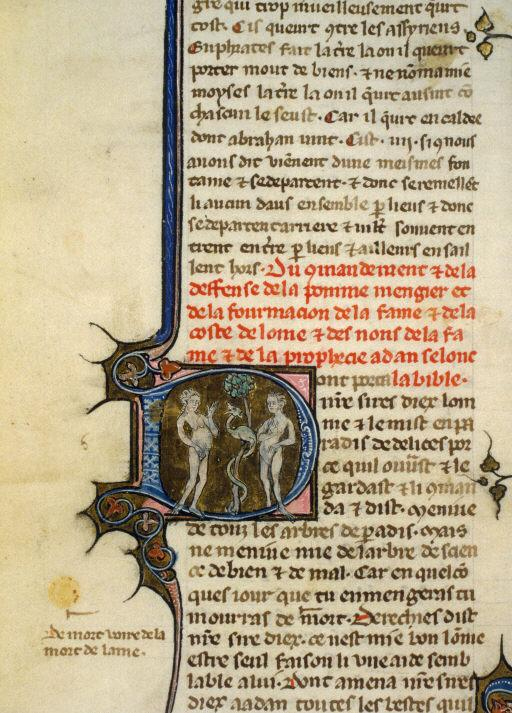
The different types of the Historical Bible is clearly shown here (aqui ms fr 155). Above the red rubric, a translation of the Historia Scholastica by Comestor, and below, in larger script, Genesis.

- S. Berger :
  - La Bible romane au Moyen Âge : Bibles provençales, vaudoises, catalanes, italiennes, castillanes et portugaises, Genève, Slatkine Reprints (réimpression des articles extraits de Romania XVIII-XXVIII, 1889-1899), 1977.
  - Histoire de la Vulgate pendant les premiers siècles du Moyen Âge, Paris, Hachette, 1893.
  - De l'histoire de la Vulgate en France. Leçon d'ouverture faite le 4 novembre 1887, Paris, Fischbacher, 1887.
  - Des Essais qui ont été faits à Paris au treizième siècle pour corriger le texte de la Vulgate, Paris, Fischbacher, 1887.
  - La Bible française au Moyen Âge : étude sur les plus anciennes versions de la Bible écrites en prose de langue d'oil, Genève, Slatkine Reprints (Fac Similé de l'édition originale Paris, 1884), 1967.
- Guyart des Moulins
  - Bible historiale ou Bible française, édition de Jean de Rely, 1543.
- P. Paris, Les Manuscrits français de la bibliothèque du roi, Paris, Techener, place du Louvre, 1836, I-VII.
- Jeanette Patterson, Making the Bible French: The 'Bible historiale' and the Medieval Lay Reader. Toronto: University of Toronto Press, 2022.
- Jeanette Patterson, « Stolen Scriptures: The Bible historiale and the Hundred Years' War », Rethinking the Boundaries of Patronage. Deborah L. McGrady (éd.), Special issue of Digital Philology: A Journal of Medieval Cultures 2:2 », Digital Philology: A Journal of Medieval Cultures, no 2.2, 2015
- M. Quereuil [dir.], La Bible française du XIIIe siècle, édition critique de la Genèse, Genève, Droz, « Publications Romanes et Françaises », 1988.
- J. J. Rive (a pupil of), La Chasse aux antiquaires et bibliographes mal avisés, Londres, N. Aphobe, 1787.
- X.-L. Salvador
  - Archéologie et étymologie sémantiques avec une édition du livre de l'Exode, Bucarest, Zeta Books, 266 pp (ISBN 978-606-697-044-0 (eBook)).
  - Vérité et écriture(s), Paris, Champion, 2005 (avec une édition critique du Livre de la Genèse de la Bible Historiale mentionnant les emprunts à Comestor et les citations de la Glossa)
  - « L'utilisation du pont dans la théologie chrétienne médiévale », Les Ponts au Moyen Âge, Paris, Presses universitaires de France, 2005.
  - « La Réécriture argumentative impliquée par la traduction du livre de la Genèse : l'example des énoncés car q dans The Medieval translator, the Theory and practice of translation in the Middle Ages, R. Ellis [ed.], Paris, Brepols, 2005.
  - « L'Enceinte sacrée des traductions vulgaires de la Bible au Moyen Âge », La Clôture – Actes du colloque qui s'est déroulé à Bologne et à Florence les 8, 9 et 10 mai 2003, Préface de Claude Thomasset, textes réunis par Xavier-Laurent Salvador, Bologna, Clueb, 2005.
  - « L'example de "derechief" dans la traduction de la Bible historiale », Actes des XIe journée d'ancien et de moyen français (Anvers 2005), en cours de publication.
  - « Une Autre définition de l'étymologie : dire le Vrai dans la Bible au Moyen Âge », Mélanges en l'honneur de Claude Thomasset, Paris, Presses universitaires de Paris-Sorbonne, 2003.
  - « Les "Biblismes", un système de définition original du lexique dans le discours pédagogique de la Bible Historiale », dans Lessicologia e lessicografia nella storia degli insegnamenti linguistici, Quaderni del Cirsil - 2 (2003), 14-15 novembre 2003, Bologna, http://amsacta.cib.unibo.it/archive/00000931/.
  - « Des Coffres hébraïques aux bougettes françaises, La translation du sacré à travers les traductions médiévales de la Bible », Coffres et contenants au Moyen Âge, Paris, Presses universitaires de France, en cours de parution.
- F. Vieillard, « Compte rendu de l'édition de la Bible du XIIIe », Romania, n°109, p. 131–137.
- Clive Sneddon, La Bible française au Moyen Âge : étude sur les plus anciennes versions de la Bible écrites en prose de langue d'oil, Genève, slatkine, 1967
- Clive Sneddon, The 'Bible du XIIIe siècle', Its Medieval Public in the Light of its Manuscript Tradition in The Bible and Medieval Culture, Genève, slatkine, 1979
