= Story of Melchizedek =

Apocryphal account of Melchizedek's life

Start of a Latin version of the Story in the 10th-century Codex of Roda from Spain

The Story of Melchizedek or History of Melchizedek (Latin: Historia de Melchisedech) is an anonymous apocryphal account of the life of Melchizedek. Melchizedek is a priest and king mentioned twice in the Hebrew Bible (Genesis 14:18–20 and Psalm 110:4) and once in the New Testament (Hebrews 7). Originally written in Greek, the Story of Melchizedek is usually classified as part of the Old Testament pseudepigrapha.

== Textual history ==
The Story was probably written in a Jewish milieu in Egypt or the Levant between the 1st and 3rd centuries AD. It is known through two different recensions, each revised by a Christian editor. They differ in the order of their parts. One contains a false attribution to Athanasius and is therefore often known as "Pseudo-Athanasius". This attribution is universally rejected as a part of the original. The other recension was incorporated into the 8th- or 9th-century Byzantine Palaea historica under the title Concerning Melchizedek. It rearranges the text, putting the main story inside a frame story. All other versions in other languages are derived from these two Christian recensions.

The text circulated widely in the early church. Translations into Syriac, Arabic, Armenian, Georgian and Romanian are known. There are three independent translations into Latin and two partial translations into Coptic, one in the Sahidic dialect and another in Bohairic. These Coptic excerpts were incorporated into the eucharistic Prayer of the Breaking of the Bread. An Ethiopic excerpt was used in the same way. The Story achieved its greatest popularity, however, in Slavonic. Both recensions were independently translated into Slavonic, then later combined and abbreviated to form a new shorter version. There were subsequently two further revisions of the Slavonic text, to produce a total of five distinct Slavonic versions.

== Synopsis ==
Melchizedek and his brother Melchi are the only sons of the pagan king of Salem, Melchi, son of Salaad and grandson of Queen Salem. Their mother is also named Salem. One day, the king orders Melchizedek to fetch some cattle to sacrifice to idols in the temple of the Twelve Gods. While on his way, Melchizedek observes the sun and contemplates the moon and stars, concluding that the one who created them is the only one worthy of worship. He returns to his father without the cattle and tries to persuade his father to abandon paganism for monotheism. An enraged Melchi decides to sacrifice one of his sons instead. Through his mother's intervention, Melchizedek is spared and his brother is sacrificed (along with hundreds of other boys).

Melchizedek flees Salem for Mount Tabor. As the sacrifice is ongoing, he prays that God would punish all those who take part. The city of Salem and everyone in it, including all of Melchizedek's family, is swallowed up. When he realizes what has happened, Melchizedek returns to Mount Tabor and spends the next seven years completely naked in the forest, living off of berries and dew. Abram goes to Mount Tabor, finds Melchizedek, shaves and clothes him, as God instructed. Three days later, Melchizedek blesses Abram and anoints him Abraham. The two offer sacrifices of bread and wine to God.

== Bibliography ==
- Böttrich, Christfried (2010). Geschichte Melchisedeks. Gütersloher Verlagshaus.
- Böttrich, Christfried (2016). "Melchizedek among Russian Saints: The History of Melchizedek between Jews and Slavs". In Alexander Kulik; Catherine Mary MacRobert; Svetlina Nikolova; Moshe Taube; Cynthia M. Vakareliyska (eds.). The Bible in Slavic Tradition. Brill. pp. 373–390. doi:10.1163/9789004313675.
- Dochhorn, Jan (2004). "Die Historia de Melchisedech (Hist Melch): Einführung, editorischer Vorbericht und Editiones praeliminares". Le Muséon. 117 (1): 7–48. doi:10.2143/mus.117.1.504576.
- Horton, Fred L. (1976). The Melchizedek Tradition: A Critical Examination of the Sources to the Fifth Century A.D. and in the Epistle to the Hebrews. Cambridge University Press.
- Lied, Liv Ingeborg (2015). "Text—Work—Manuscript: What Is an 'Old Testament Pseudepigraphon'?" (PDF). Journal for the Study of the Pseudepigrapha. 25 (2): 150–165.
- Minov, Sergey (2016). "Reception of the Greek Story of Melchizedek in Syriac Christian Tradition". Journal for the Study of the Pseudepigrapha. 26 (2): 108–143.
- Pelle, Stephen (2013). "A Preliminary Study of the Historia de Melchisedech in the Latin West". Apocrypha. 24: 57–90. doi:10.1484/j.apocra.1.103498.
- Piovanelli, Pierluigi (2013). "The Story of Melchizedek with the Melchizedek Legend from the Chronicon Paschale: A New Translation and Introduction". In Richard Bauckham; James Davila; Alex Panayotov (eds.). Old Testament Pseudepigrapha: More Noncanonical Scriptures. Vol. 1. William B. Eerdmans. pp. 64–84.
- Robinson, S. E. (1987). "The Apocryphal Story of Melchizedek". Journal for the Study of Judaism in the Persian, Hellenistic, and Roman Period. 18 (1): 26–39. JSTOR 24658096.
- Wittkowsky, Vadim; Vitkovskaya, Maria (2018). "Neither Pseudo-Athanasius nor Palaea: Historia de Melchisedech as a Part of the Slavonic Abraham's Cycle". Scrinium. 14 (1): 351–368.
