= Margaret Deanesly =

English historian (1885 – 1977)

Margaret Deanesly (5 March 1885–9 October 1977) was an English historian who wrote on church history.

== Early life and education ==
Deanesly was born in Wincanton in Somerset in 1885 to Samuel Deanesly and his wife, Clara Maria, née Dowding, and educated at Godolphin School, Salisbury, and Newnham College, Cambridge, where she achieved a double first in the History tripos in 1912. She received the Arthur Hugh Clough Scholarship in 1912. At Newnham she was a friend and collaborator of Hope Emily Allen, who introduced Deanesly to her first scholarly project by sending her a bibliography of Richard Rolle. Deanesly then received her MA from the University of Manchester in 1915 and carried out a Marion Kennedy research studentship in 1916–1917. She held a D.Litt. from the University of Lambeth.

Deanesly lived at 196 Clarence Gate Gardens in London. She died in 1977 and was buried in East Finchley Cemetery. She left an estate valued at £113,780. Deanesly never married.

== Positions held ==
- 1917–1920: Mary Bateson research fellow, Newnham College, Cambridge
- 1920: Lecturer in history, Armstrong College, Newcastle
- 1922–1926: Bishop Fraser Lecturer in History, University of Manchester
- 1936–1939: Lecturer at Royal Holloway College, London
- 1939–1940: Lecturer at Bedford College, London
- 1954: Birkbeck Lecturer, Cambridge

== Select publications ==
- Deanesly, Margaret (1920). The Lollard Bible and other medieval Biblical versions. Robarts - University of Toronto. Cambridge University Press.
- Deanesly, M. (1920). "Vernacular Books in England in the Fourteenth and Fifteenth Centuries". The Modern Language Review. 15 (4): 349–358. doi:10.2307/3714612. ISSN 0026-7937. JSTOR 3714612.
- Deanesly, Margaret (1923). A History Of The Medieval Church 590-1500.
- Deanesly, Margaret (1969). A history of early Medieval Europe from 476 to 911. Internet Archive. London, Methuen. ISBN 978-0-416-29970-0.
