= David Martin (French theologian) =

French Protestant theologian

David Martin (7 September 1639; Revel, Diocese of Lavaur – 9 September 1721), was a learned French Protestant theologian.

He was educated at Montauban, and at the academy of the reformed at Nîmes. He afterwards studied divinity at Puy-Laurent, whither the academy of Montauban had been removed. Having been admitted to the ministry in 1663, he settled as pastor with the church of Esperance, in the diocese of Castres. In 1670 he accepted an invitation to the church of La Caune, in the same diocese, where he officiated till the revocation of the edict of Nantes, in 1685. In 1686, the magistrates of Deventer invited him to become professor of divinity and pastor of the Walloon church in that city; but the regency of Utrecht, where he had taken up his residence, fully apprised of his merit, prevailed upon him to accept the office of pastor in their city.

He had studied his native language grammatically; and when the French Academy was about to publish the second edition of their Dictionary, he sent them remarks and observations, of which they availed themselves, with polite acknowledgments to the author. He died of a violent fever in 1721, after he had completed his eighty-second year.

== Publications ==
- an edition of the New Testament, according to the Geneva version, with corrections, notes, new prefaces to each book, etc., printed at Utrecht in 1696, 4to;
- a History of the Old and New Testament, at Amsterdam, in 1707, in two volumes, folio, embellished with upwards of 420 beautiful engravings, which is commonly called Mortier's Bible, after the name of the printer;
- an edition of The Holy Bible, with corrections, notes, and prefaces, at Amsterdam, 1702, in 2 vols, fol., which was afterwards reprinted in 1712, in 4to, with parallel passages, and short notes in the margin;
- The Excellence of Faith, and its Effects, explained in twenty Sermons on the eleventh Chapter of the Epistle to the Hebrews; A Treatise on Natural Religion;
- The true Sense of 110th Psalm, opposed to that of John Masson;
- and Two Critical Dissertations: one on the three heavenly witnesses, in the 7th verse of the fifth chapter of St. John's first Epistle;
- and the other on a passage in Josephus, in which our Lord is mentioned, maintaining its authenticity.

By the former of these dissertations he involved himself in controversies with our countryman, Mr Emlyn and father Le Long of the Oratory, which gave rise to a variety of publications by the respective combatants, in which they went over the same ground that has been since traversed by Travis, Porson, and Marah.

The last production of M. Martin was, A Treatise on revealed Religion, in 2 vols, 8vo; this has been translated into English.

== Sources ==
- A New General Biographical Dictionary, Hugh James Rose B.D., Vol IX, London, 1857. A publication now in the public domain.
