= Louis Segond =

Swiss theologian (1810–1885)

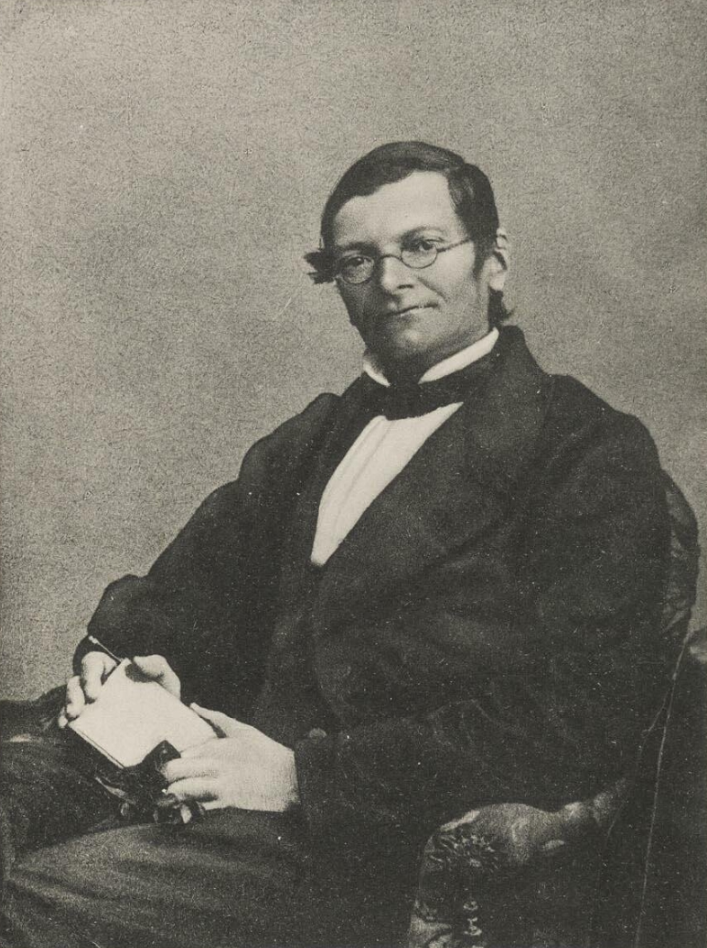
Louis Segond

Louis Segond (3 May 1810 – 18 June 1885) was a Swiss theologian who translated the Bible into French from the original texts in Hebrew and Greek.

Segond was born in Plainpalais, near Geneva. After studying theology in Geneva, Strasbourg and Bonn, he was pastor of the Geneva National Church in Chêne-Bougeries, then from 1872, Professor of Old Testament in Geneva.

== Biography ==
Segond was born into a family of modest wealth, the son of Joseph Segond, a shoemaker, and Jeanne Christine Dufour. His father was a French Catholic from Pariset, while his mother was a member of the Protestant Church of Geneva, the denomination he would be baptized into. Segond entered the Academy of Geneva in 1826, where he studied natural sciences. Afterward, he joined the theological department of the University of Strasbourg. During that time, he spent a year and a half working in Bonn and another year in Eisenach. In 1839, he became pastor of the Genevan Church in Chêne-Bougeries.

Segond served as military chaplain of the 2nd Genevan Battalion during the Sonderbund civil war of 1847. In 1871, he returned to the University of Geneva to become a professor studying the Old Testament. The translation of the Old Testament, commissioned by the Vénérable Compagnie des Pasteurs de Genève, was published in two volumes in 1871. It was at this time that he began to work on his translation, work that would be completed in 1880. A revised edition was commissioned for and published by the British and Foreign Bible Society in 1910.
