= New Jerusalem Bible =

1985 Catholic English translation of the Bible

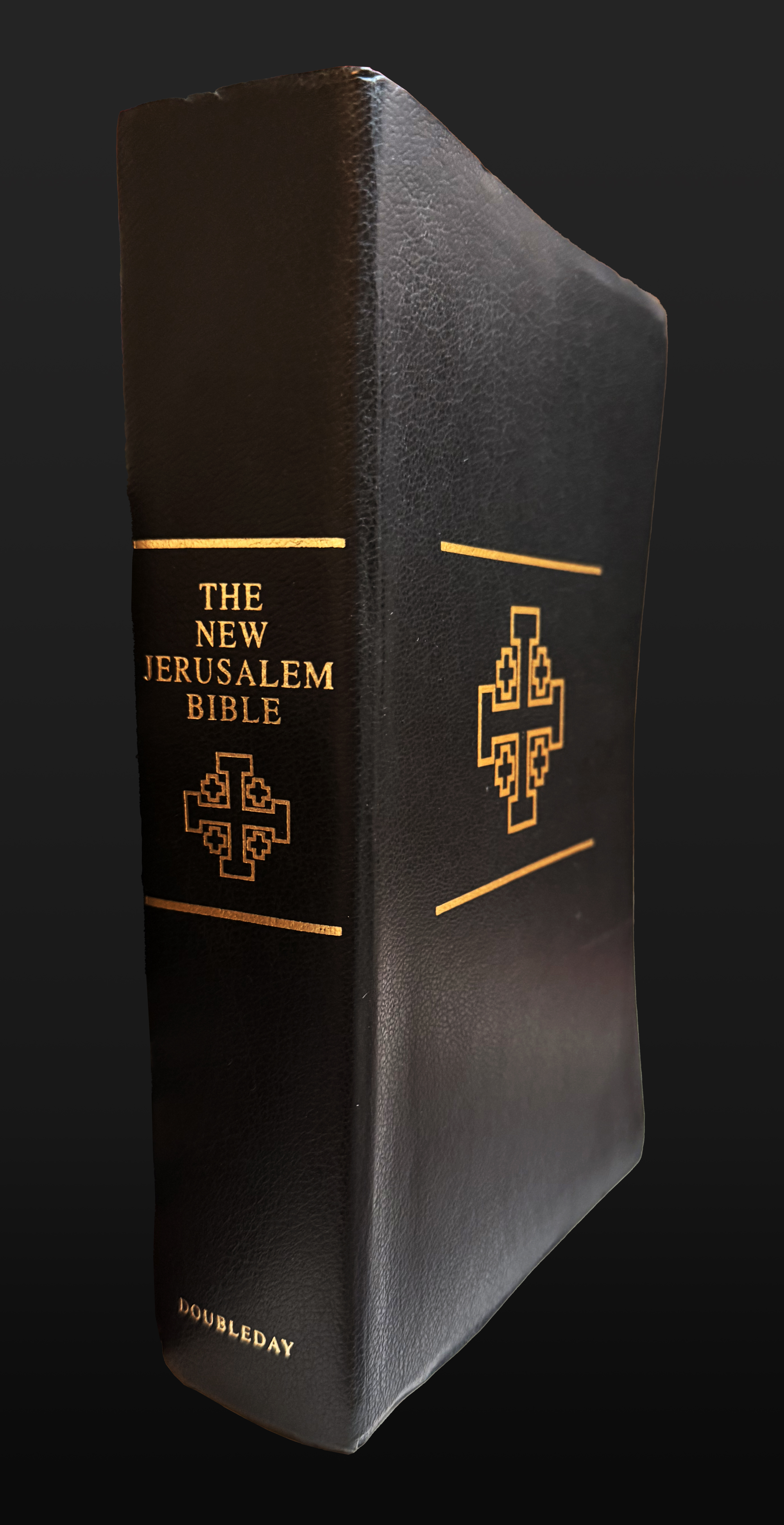
- Full name: New Jerusalem Bible
- Abbreviation: NJB
- Complete Bible published: 1985
- Textual basis: NT: Novum Testamentum Graece 25th ed., with occasional parallels to Codex Bezae. OT: Biblia Hebraica Stuttgartensia with Septuagint influence. Deuterocanon: Septuagint with Vulgate influence.
- Translation type: Dynamic equivalence
- Reading level: High school
- Publisher: Darton, Longman and Todd and Les Editions du Cerf
- Copyright: 1985
- Religious affiliation: Catholic
- Genesis 1:1–3 In the beginning God created heaven and earth. Now the earth was a formless void, there was darkness over the deep, with a divine wind sweeping over the waters. God said, 'Let there be light,' and there was light. John 3:16 For this is how God loved the world: he gave his only Son, so that everyone who believes in him may not perish but may have eternal life.

The New Jerusalem Bible (NJB) is an English translation of the Bible published in 1985 by Darton, Longman and Todd and Les Editions du Cerf, edited by Benedictine biblical scholar Henry Wansbrough.

This Bible was approved for use in study and personal devotion by members of the Catholic Church and approved also by the Church of England.

== Sources ==
This version of scripture is translated directly from the Hebrew, Greek and Aramaic. The 1973 French translation, the Bible de Jérusalem, is followed only where the text admits to more than one interpretation. The introductions and notes, with some modifications, are taken from the Bible de Jérusalem.

== Overview ==
The New Jerusalem Bible is an update to the Jerusalem Bible, an English version of the French Bible de Jérusalem. It is commonly held that the Jerusalem Bible was not a translation from the French; rather, it was an original translation heavily influenced by the French. This view is not shared by Henry Wansbrough, editor of the New Jerusalem Bible, who writes, "Despite claims to the contrary, it is clear that the Jerusalem Bible was translated from the French, possibly with occasional glances at the Hebrew or Greek, rather than vice versa."

Like the Jerusalem Bible, the New Jerusalem Bible makes the uncommon decision to render God's name, the Tetragrammaton in the Jewish scriptures, as Yahweh rather than as "Lord", in 6,823 places in the NJB Old Testament. This decision was based on translating or reinstating the earliest known copy of parts of the Old Testament found at Qumran in 1947 (the Dead Sea Scrolls), dating to about the second century BCE. Coincidentally, the Qumran text sometimes agrees with the Septuagint, from about the same period, rather than with the later Masoretic text. For example, in Deuteronomy 32:8–9, not only is "Lord" translated as Yahweh, but a phrase "sons of Israel" is corrected to "sons/children of God" on basis of the Qumran and the Septuagint texts. The NJB is one of the versions authorized to be used in services of the Episcopal Church and the Anglican Communion.

The New Jerusalem Bible also transliterates the Hebrew term "Sabaoth" rather than using the traditional rendering, thus "Yahweh Sabaoth" instead of "Lord of hosts". This is for the sake of accuracy, as the translation of "Sabaoth" is uncertain.

== Successor to the NJB ==
The French reference for The New Jerusalem Bible, and the source of its study notes, is the La Bible de Jérusalem, last updated in 1998. A new Bible project began operating under the title The Bible in its Traditions. According to the notes, more weight would be given to the Septuagint in the translation of the Hebrew Bible Scriptures, though the Masoretic Text will remain the primary source. The Demonstration Volume (in English, French and Spanish) later became available. The French portion of the Demonstration Volume is also became available online, together with a single sample of the English translation.

The publisher Darton, Longman and Todd published the final product, the Revised New Jerusalem Bible in 2019. The first edition, containing the New Testament and the Psalms, was published in February 2018, and the full Bible in July 2019. Substantially revising the JB and NJB texts, the new translation "applies formal equivalence translation for a more accurate rendering of the original scriptures, sensitivity to readable speech patterns and more inclusive language." It contains new study notes and book introductions, written by Henry Wansbrough.

== See also ==
- Catholic Bible
- Council of Trent
- Dei verbum
- Divino afflante Spiritu
- Liturgiam authenticam
- Second Vatican Council
