= Samuel Cahen =

French Hebraist and journalist

Samuel Cahen (4 August 1796, Metz, France – 8 January 1862, Paris) was a French Hebraist and journalist.

== Early life ==
Cahen was brought up at Mainz. He pursued a course of rabbinical studies while simultaneously devoting much attention to modern languages and literatures. After completing his education Cahen was engaged as a private tutor in Germany. In 1822 he went to Paris, where he assumed the directorship of the Jewish Consistorial School, a position which he held for a number of years. In 1840, Cahen founded the Archives Israélites, a French Jewish review.

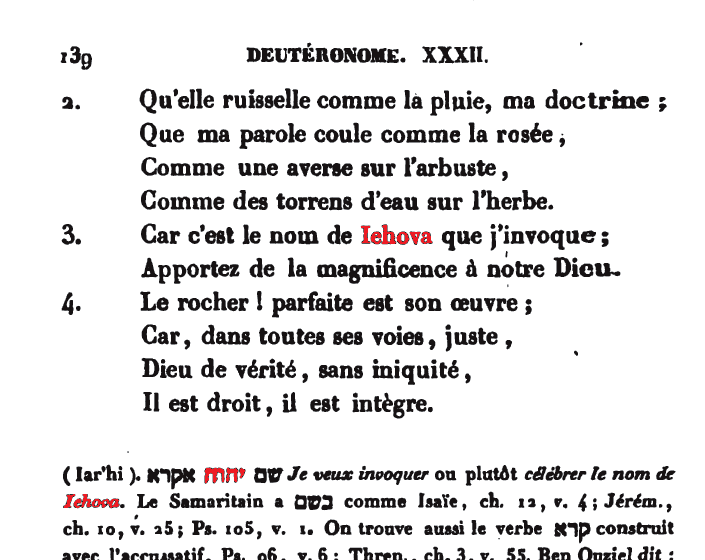
Cahen used the form Iehova for rendering in French the Hebrew Tetragrammaton.

== Major Work ==
Cahen's main work was the translation of the Jewish Bible into French, with the Hebrew on opposite pages, and critical notes and dissertations by himself and others. The entire edition, consisting of eighteen volumes, appeared at Paris in 1851. Despite adverse criticism, denying Cahen critical perception in the choice of his material, the undertaking exerted a great influence upon a whole generation of French Jewry. In addition to this monumental work of his, Cahen was the author of the following:

- Cours de Lecture Hébraïque, Suivi de Plusieurs Prières, avec Traduction Interlinéaire, et d'un Petit Vocabulaire Hébreu-Français, Metz, 1824
- Précis d'instruction religieuse, 1829
- A new French translation of the Haggadah of Passover, Paris, 1831–32
- Almanach Hébreu, 1831.

Cahen was appointed a chevalier of the Legion of Honor in 1849.
