= Henry Wansbrough =

English theologian, educator, and priest (born 1934)

The Very Reverend Henry Wansbrough OSB
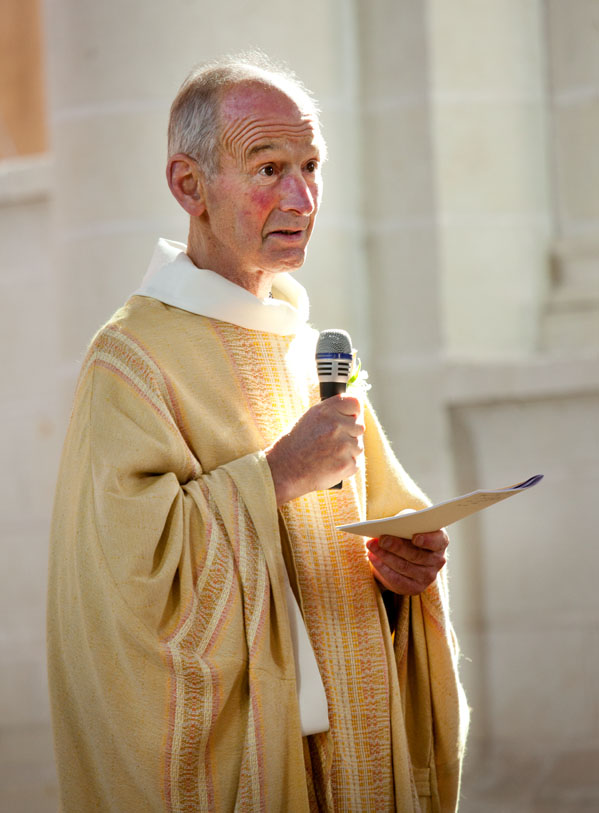
- Wansbrough in 2010
- Born: Joseph Wansbrough; 9 October 1934 (age 92); London, England

Ecclesiastical career
- Religion: Christianity (Roman Catholic)
- Church: Latin Church
- Ordained: 1964 (priest)

Academic background
- Education: University of Oxford; University of Fribourg

Academic work
- Discipline: Biblical studies
- Institutions: St Benet's Hall, Oxford; Liverpool Hope University
- Notable works: New Jerusalem Bible (1985); Revised New Jerusalem Bible (2019)

Henry Wansbrough OSB (born Joseph Wansbrough, 1934) is an English biblical scholar, Catholic priest and Benedictine monk of Ampleforth Abbey. From 1990 to 2004, he served as Master of St Benet's Hall, Oxford.

== Biography ==
Born as Joseph Wansbrough on 9 October 1934 in London, England, Henry Wansbrough is Cathedral Prior of Norwich (2004–present), Magister Scholarum of the English Benedictine Congregation (2001–present), member of the Pontifical Biblical Commission (1997–2007), Chairman of the Trustees of the Catholic Biblical Association (1996–present), and Emeritus Member of the Faculty of Theology in the University of Oxford (1990–present). He is Alexander Jones Professor of Biblical Studies within the Department of Theology, Philosophy and Religious studies at Liverpool Hope University. From 1990 until 2004 he was Master of St Benet's Hall, the Benedictine permanent private hall of the University of Oxford.

While studying at the University of Oxford he was examined by novelist C.S. Lewis.

He was an early advocate for the acceptance of Protestant scholars, persuading the editors of the Catholic Commentary on Holy Scripture to remove asterisks highlighting the contributions of Protestant scholars in the second edition, arguing that “we can learn from one another”.

He was General Editor of the New Jerusalem Bible and the Revised New Jerusalem Bible. He has written twenty books, more than sixty articles, around ninety book reviews, an edition of the Synoptic Gospels, with an accompanying textbook, for A-Level students, and more than fifty electronic booklets, essays, and lectures, as well as editing, co-editing, and translating other volumes.

He produces the "Wednesday Word" a not-for-profit collaborative charitable trust based at St Austin's Catholic Church, Wakefield, West Yorkshire which aims to spread the Sunday Gospel to families through primary schools and enriching the Home, School & Parish partnership.

He currently resides at Ampleforth Abbey, working as a religious studies teacher at Ampleforth College where he stays active by riding his scooter around the school. He also works as a house chaplain at St Oswald's boarding house.

== Bibliography ==
- The Psalms: A Commentary for Prayer and Reflection ISBN 9781841016481
- The Lion and the Bull: Gospels of Mark and Luke (Darton, Longman & Todd Ltd, 1996) ISBN 9780232521627
- The Gospel according to John (2002) ISBN 9781860821608
- The Passion and Death of Jesus (2004)
- The Story of the Bible: How It Came to Us (2006) ISBN 9781593250720
- The Use and Abuse of the Bible: A Brief History of Biblical Interpretation (T&T Clark, 2010) ISBN 9780567090577
- Introducing the New Testament (T&T Clark, 2015) ISBN 9780567656698

== See also ==
- English Benedictine Congregation

Academic offices
Preceded by Fabian Cowper	Master of St Benet's Hall, Oxford; 1990–2004	Succeeded by Leo Chamberlain
