= Raoul de Presles (died 1382) =

Presentation miniature showing Raoul giving his translation of Augustine to Charles V

Raoul de Presles (1314/5 – 10 November 1382) was a French lawyer, royal advisor, author and translator.

== Life ==
Raoul was born in 1314–1315. He was an illegitimate child. His father, also Raoul de Presles, was a lawyer to King Philip IV of France. His mother was Marie de la Porte, also called Marie des Vertus. He was conceived and born during his father's imprisonment in the Grand Châtelet.

The younger Raoul followed his father into the legal profession and served as an advisor to King Charles V. In 1365, Raoul described himself as a short man, aged and infirm. He makes several further references to ill health before dying on 10 November 1382 at an advanced age for the time.

== Works ==
Between 1363 and 1366, Raoul wrote two original works in Latin. The Compendium morale de re publica he dedicated to Bishop Jean d'Anguerant. His Musa was dedicated to Charles V. For Charles he also translated John of Paris's Rex pacificus and the anonymous Quaestio in utramque partem.

In 1371, Charles V commissioned Raoul to make an Old French translation of Augustine's City of God. This work was completed in 1375. The presentation copy prepared for the king still survives in Paris, Bibliothèque nationale de France, f.f. 22912–22913. It is a two-volume illuminated manuscript with "naively literal" but vivid illustrations. The programme of illustration was probably devised by Raoul himself. As there was no existing cycle of illustrations for Augustine's text, Raoul's choices were highly influential. The same workshop that produced the king's copy produced another copy later owned by John, Duke of Berry, and used the same illustration cycle for a copy of the Latin City of God around the same time.

Each chapter of the translation is followed by Raoul's original commentary. The total length of the commentary is equal to the length of Augustine's text. Raoul's comments draw heavily on those of his predecessors (Nicholas Trevet, Thomas Waleys, John Ridewall, John Baconthorpe, François de Meyronnes and Jacopo Passavanti).

Raoul also translated the Bible into French. His preface is dated 1377.

== Sources ==
- Fiorentino, Francesco (2016). "Raoul of Presles: A Fourteenth-Century Translation of De civitate Dei". In Fabrizio Amerini; Stefano Caroti (eds.). Ipsum verum non videbis nisi in philosophiam totus intraveris: Studi in onore di Franco De Capitani (PDF). E-theca OnLineOpenAccess Edizioni. pp. 340–374.
- Lombard-Jourdan, Anne (1981). "À propos de Raoul de Presles: Documents sur l'homme". Bibliothèque de l'école des chartes. 139 (2): 191–207.
- Smith, Sharon Dunlap (1982). "New Themes for the City of God around 1400: The Illustrations of Raoul de Presles' Translation". Scriptorium. 36 (1): 68–82.
