= Historia scholastica =

Biblical paraphrase in Medieval Latin by Petrus Comestor

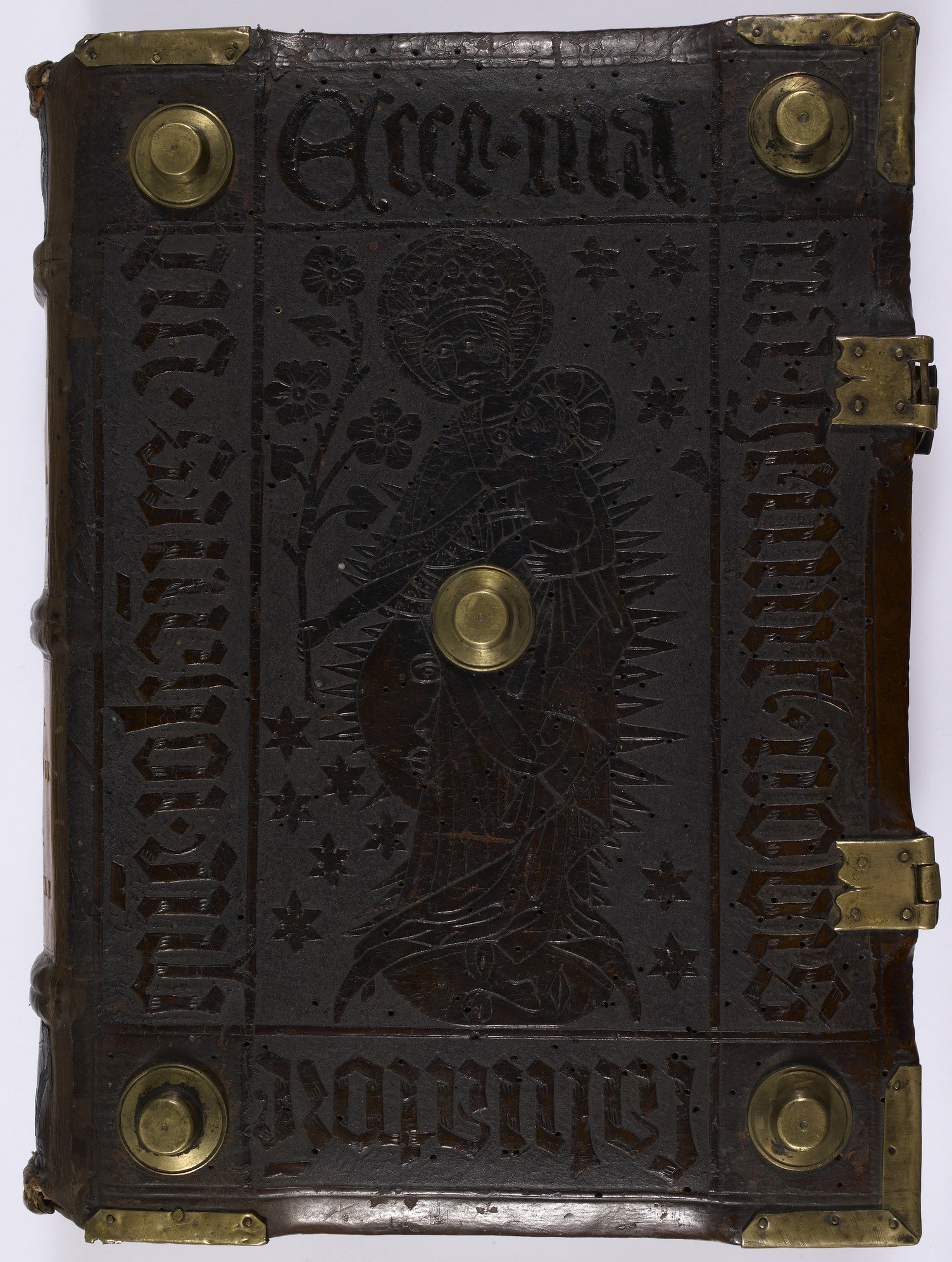
Front cover of Historia scholastica. Germany (Amerbach), c. 1451. British Library

The Historia scholastica (Latin pronunciation: [his'toria sko'lastika]) is a Biblical paraphrase written in Medieval Latin by Petrus Comestor. Completed around 1173, he wrote it for the cathedral school of Notre Dame in Paris. Sometimes called the "Medieval Popular Bible", it draws on the Bible and other sources, including the works of classical scholars and the Fathers of the Church, to present an overview of sacred history.

The Historia scholastica quickly became a school text, a required part of the curriculum at both Paris and Oxford. Preserved in more than 800 manuscripts dated from 1175 to the end of the 15th century, the College of Sorbonne library alone held seventeen copies.

Some years before 1200, Petrus Riga wrote a work called Aurora, a version of the Historia scholastica in verse that served as a sort of Aide-mémoire. Since then, the Historia scholastica served as the base for many redactions, versifications, and translations. The most significant of these include the Chronicle of the World (Weltchronik) by Rudolf von Ems (c.1250, Middle High German), the Rijmbijbel (Rhyming Bible) by Jacob van Maerlant (c. 1271, translation of Aurora into Dutch), and the Bible historiale by Guyart des Moulins (c. 1295, Old French).

The Historia scholastica was among the earliest printed works, with editions appearing c. 1470 in both Strasbourg and Reutlingen.

== See also ==
- Palaea Historica
