= Guyart des Moulins =

Guyart des Moulins was a thirteenth century monk. He is famous for being the author of the first Bible translation in French, the Bible Historiale (1291–95).

== Life ==
According to Alexis Paulin Paris, his name is written in "The Directory of manuscripts in the Library of the King" as Guyart des Moulins or Guyart-des-Moulins. His name is also found transcribed as Guiard Desmoulins; Guiart Desmoulins; Guiart des Moulins; and Guyar des Moulins. All these names refer to the author of the Bible Historiale.

In the prologue of the Bible Historiale, his year of birth is given as 1251. He was a chanoine de Saint Pierre (canon of St Peter) in Aire-sur-la-Lys, and became dean there in 1297. He held this office until his death in 1312 or 1322.

== Works ==
His Bible Historiale was largely translated from Peter Comestor's Historia Scholastica, and was later augmented with translations from the Vulgate.

Paulin Paris wrote of his work, "It was for the people of the world that our Guyart des Moulins translated the Bible into French, more than a century after the death of Petrus Comestor."
