= Peter Comestor =

12th-century French theologian

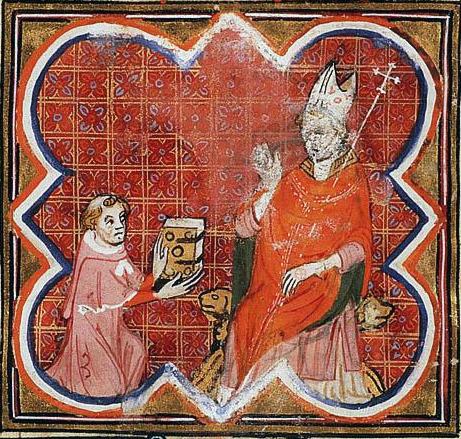
Petrus Comestor presents the Bible Historiale to Archbishop Guillaume of Sens.

Peter Comestor (Latin: Petrus Comestor, "Peter the Eater"; French: Pierre le Mangeur; died 22 October 1178) was a 12th-century French theological writer and university teacher.

== Life ==
Peter Comestor was born in Troyes. Although the surname Comestor (Latin for "Eater") was popularly attributed to his habit of devouring books and learning, it was more probably simply a family name. It did, however, give Peter a nice pun for his epitaph (supposed to have been composed by him): Petrus eram quem petra tegit, dictusque Comestor nunc comedor ("I whom this stone covers was Peter, called the 'Devourer', now I am devoured").

As a young man, Peter studied at the Troyes Cathedral school, where he might have come into contact with Peter Abelard. Sometime later, he was a student in Paris under, amongst others, Peter Lombard. By 1147, he was back in Troyes, having been appointed dean of Troyes Cathedral. By 1160, Peter had returned to Paris to teach, holding the chair of theology at the university, from which he retired in 1169. He was made chancellor of Notre Dame in Paris around 1164, which put him, among other things, in charge of the cathedral school. He held the post until his death in 1178. Peter's reputation as an academic was such that Pope Alexander III specifically exempted Peter from his ban on charging fees for giving licences to teach.

Peter was buried in the Abbey of Saint Victor. He may have retired and become a canon there, as he was celebrated thus by the canons in their necrology.

== Works ==
=== Historia Scholastica ===
Peter's most famous work was his Historia Scholastica: as Beryl Smalley called it, a 'great study of biblical history'. The Historia was completed by 1173, Peter having spent some time writing it at the Abbey of Saint Victor. Peter dedicated it to William, bishop of Sens. The Historia was a core text during the following centuries, even being a source, perhaps, for The Canterbury Tales.

=== Other works ===
Many of Peter's works are still unpublished. Among his works are:

- Sermons: 50 are in Migne PL, misattributed to Hildebert of Lavardin (PL clxxi, 330–964, others in PL cxcviii, 1721–1844). The precise number of Peter's sermons is not entirely agreed upon.
- Liber de Sacramentis
- De Poenitentia
- Breviarum Sententiarum
- Glosses on the Gospels, the Glossa Ordinaria, the Psalter, St Paul, and the Twelve Minor Prophets
- Sententiae de Sacramentis, an abridgement of Peter Lombard's Sentences
- Treatises on the Eucharist and on Confession
- Questiones

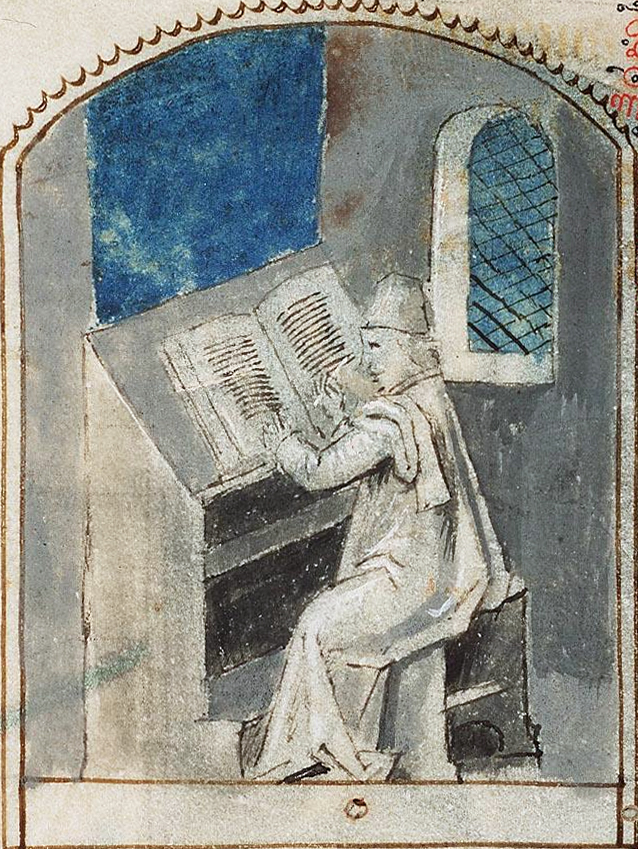
Petrus Comestor writing, from a c. 1470 manuscript

== Editions ==
- Petri Comestoris Scolastica Historia: Liber Genesis. Edited by Agneta Sylwan. Turnhout: Brepols, 2004, Pp. xc + 227. (Corpus Christianorum Continuatio Mediaevalis, 191). ISBN 978-2503049113

== Manuscripts ==
=== Historia scholastica ===
- Épinal, Bibliothèque municipale, ms. 50 s. xiii
- British Library, Harley MS 4132. s. xiii.
- British Library, Egerton MS 272. s. xiii.
- Durham Cathedral, B.III.20. s. xiii.
- Hereford Cathedral, P.v.15. s. xiii in.
- Lincoln Cathedral, 80. s. xii.
- Lincoln Cathedral, 86. s. xiii

=== Other works ===
- Hereford Cathedral, O.vii.3. Sermones s. xiii in.
- Oxford, Bodleian Library, MS. Bodley 494. Textus glosatus super Iohannem etc. s. xii/xiii. H.
- Oxford, Bodleian Library, MS. Bodley 748. Petrus Comestor s. xiv.
- Oxford, Corpus Christi College 159. Peter Comestor s. xiv in.
- Lincoln Cathedral, 153. s. xii ex.
- Lincoln Cathedral, 159. s. xiv/xv.
