= Acre Bible =

Partial Old French version of the Old Testament

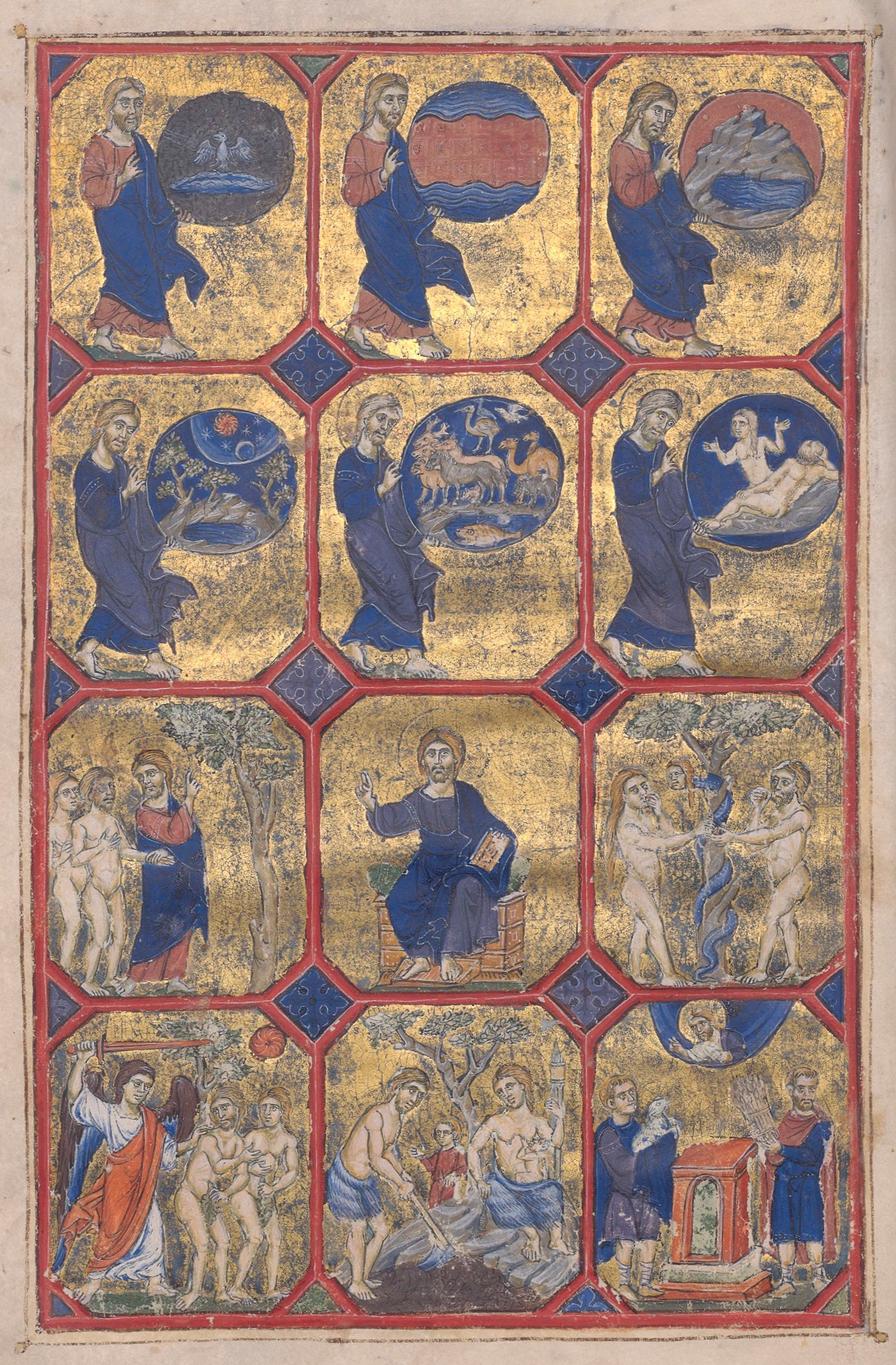
Genesis frontispiece from the Arsenal copy showing the six days of Creation and the stories of Adam and Eve and Cain and Abel

The Acre Bible is a partial Old French version of the Old Testament, containing both new and revised translations of 15 canonical and 4 deuterocanonical books, plus a prologue and glosses. The books are Genesis, Exodus, Leviticus, Numbers, Deuteronomy, Joshua, Judges, 1 and 2 Samuel, 1 and 2 Kings, Judith, Esther, Job, Tobit, Proverbs, 1 and 2 Maccabees and Ruth. It is an early and somewhat rough vernacular translation. Its version of Job is the earliest vernacular translation in Western Europe.

The earliest preserved copy—a deluxe illuminated manuscript—was produced in Acre in the Kingdom of Jerusalem between 1250 and 1254 for King Louis IX of France. Two other full copies are known (one illuminated), plus a complete translation into Old Occitan. Portions of the same version are found in two other manuscripts (one illuminated) and a fragment. The fully illuminated copies are masterpieces of Crusader art.

== Origin and date ==
It is not possible to date the compilation of the Acre Bible with certainty beyond noting that the earliest copy dates to the early 1250s. It incorporates translations from before about 1170, but its chapter divisions are typical of the period after 1234. Pierre Nobel argues that the original Acre Bible contained marginal glosses, but no complete copy of the original survives. The earliest manuscript omits the glosses and the next earliest omits four books. Hugo Buchthal argues that the Acre Bible originated as the preferred vernacular version of the Outremer aristocracy. Jaroslav Folda argues that it is unproven that an "original" existed before the earliest known manuscript, that is, that the collection of translated books known as the Acre Bible circulated as a collection prior to 1250.

The earliest copy is the so-called Arsenal Bible commissioned by King Louis IX of France during his stay in the Holy Land between May 1250 and April 1254. Louis's sojourn in the Near East followed his release from captivity in Egypt after the failure of the Seventh Crusade. He spent much of his time in Acre and commissioned the Acre Bible during a stay in the city, probably closer to 1250 than 1254. Chronicle sources record Louis commissioning several books while he was in the Holy Land, although none can be identified with the Acre Bible. (Note: In December 1248, he sent books with Andrew of Longjumeau as diplomatic gifts for the Mongol khan Güyük. According to John of Joinville, in the summer of 1252, while Louis was supervising the rebuilding of Jaffa's walls, he provided the local Franciscan convent with books. In 1253, he had books, including an illuminated psalter, made for William of Rubruck for his diplomatic journey to Güyük's successor, Möngke. According to Louis's biographer Geoffrey of Beaulieu, Louis's interest in compiling a library was sparked by what he heard during his imprisonment of the library of the Caliph al-Ḥākim.) He may have brought the bible back with him to France, (Note: In the late 15th century, it belonged to Louis de Grolée. It was in the library of the Marquis de Paulmy when he founded the Arsenal.) where he founded the library of Sainte-Chapelle shortly after his return. He also commissioned an illuminated psalter at that time. The Arsenal Bible may have been one of the first books of the new library.

== Manuscripts ==
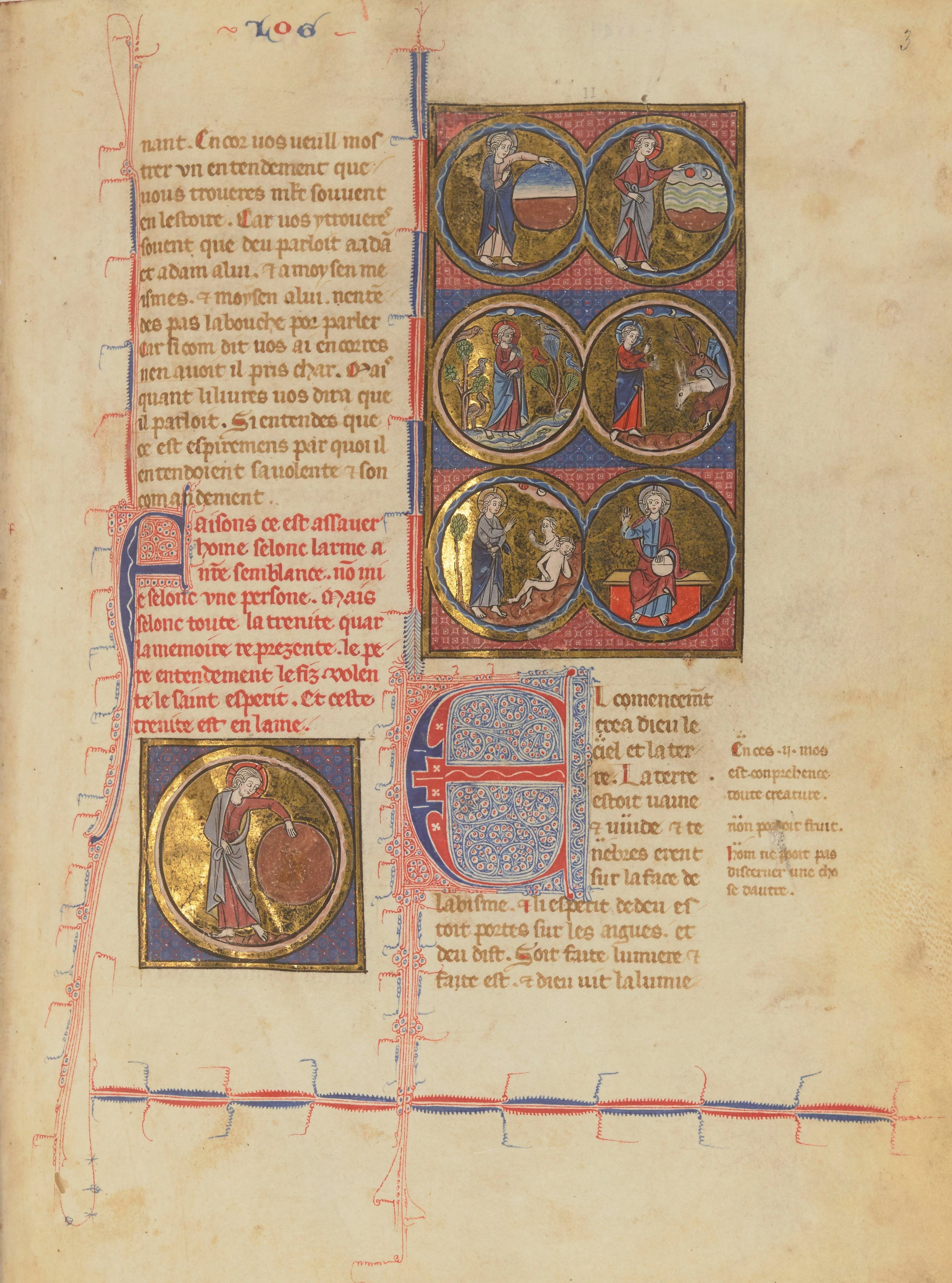
Start of Genesis in manuscript N, with separate miniatures for the first day of Creation and the next six

There are a total of seven manuscript witnesses to the text of the Acre Bible. Three complete French manuscripts of the Acre Bible have been assigned sigla (letters) by Pierre Nobel:

- A: Paris, Bibliothèque de l'Arsenal, MS 5211

The Arsenal Bible, the earliest manuscript, was created for Louis IX in Acre in 1250–1254, possibly in the Dominican friary. (Note: Louis IX was accompanied in the East by two Dominicans, Geoffrey of Beaulieu and William of Chartres.) It is illuminated in a Franco-Byzantine style. It contains a prologue (incipit Devine Escripture nos enseigne (Note: English: 'Divine Scripture teaches us'.)); a revised translation of the Hexateuch (Genesis, Exodus, Leviticus, Numbers, Deuteronomy and Joshua); existing translations of Judges, Samuel and Kings; new translations of Judith, Esther, Job (with an added preface), Tobit and Proverbs; (Note: Proverbs is divided into three: the Premier livre de Salomon (chapters 1–24), Libre des paraboles de Salomon (25–29) and Les proverbes de Salomon (chapter 30 plus Ecclesiastes 12:13). Jaroslav Folda calls these Wisdom, Parables and Proverbs.) and revised translations of Maccabees and Ruth. (Note: Compare the list of contents in Nobel 2006, pp. xvii–xix; Sneddon 2012, p. 255; Folda 2005, p. 287 and Robson 1969, p. 443. Sneddon lists the Hexateuch, but Robson omits Leviticus and Deuteronomy. Robson, pp. 444–445, contains an extract from Job.) A brief text lifted from Peter Comestor's Historia scholastica is appended to Maccabees to link it to the New Testament.

- N: Paris, Bibliothèque nationale de France, MS nouv. acq. fr. 1404

Illuminated in a Gothic style by the anonymous Hospitaller Master in Acre in 1280–1281, possibly for a Templar client, this copy was brought to France no later than the 14th century. It contains the prologue, the Hexateuch, Judges (with a preface not found in A), Samuel, Kings, Maccabees, Tobit and Judith, but is missing Ruth, Esther, Proverbs and Job. It contains glosses in the margins, which draw heavily on Comestor's Historia scholastica.

- C: Chantilly, Musée Condé, MS 3

Copied in the 14th century from manuscript N, but of little artistic worth, this copy has no miniatures, only decorated initials. Its contents are the same as N, but it does include Esther. It was in the possession of Antoine de Chourses and Catherine de Coëtivy between 1478 and 1485. (Note: The couple also acquired a manuscript illuminated by the Hospitaller Master for William of Santo Stefano, containing Old French versions of the Rhetorica ad Herennium and Cicero's De inventione, translated by John of Antioch at Acre around 1282.) From them it passed to the Bourbon-Condé and has resided in the Château de Chantilly since 1814.

In addition to the above, one lost manuscript copy is known. It is recorded in an inventory of the library of Francesco Gonzaga, captain of Mantua, in 1407. Parts of the Acre Bible (or at least the same translations) are found in two other manuscript and a fragment:

- Paris, Bibliothèque nationale de France, MS fr. 6447

This is an illustrated bible copied in 1275 in northern France and later found in the library of the dukes of Burgundy. Only Judges, Samuel and Kings are the same as the Acre version, all other books being different translations (mainly that of Herman de Valenciennes).

- Paris, Bibliothèque Mazarine, MS 54

This contains the same version of Kings as the Acre Bible.

- a fragment in the Gardner A. Sage Library, New Brunswick Theological Seminary

This contains extracts from Judges. As it dates to around 1200, it is the earliest attested part of the Acre Bible.

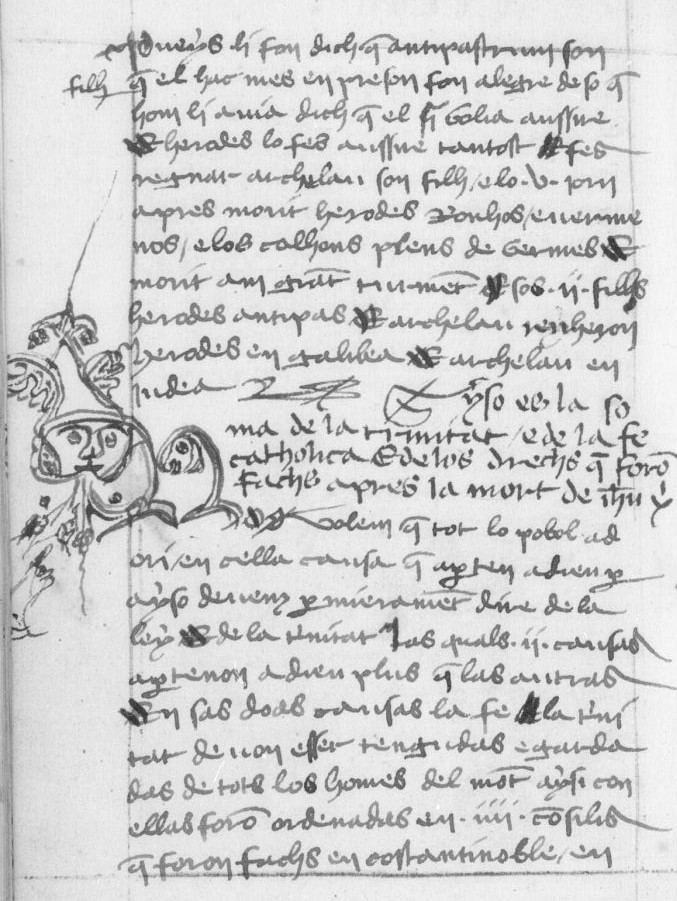
A page from the only known copy of the Occitan translation, showing a crudely decorated initial

There is an Occitan translation from the French known from a single manuscript, which also received a siglum from Nobel:

- N^{2}: Paris, Bibliothèque nationale de France, MS fr. 2426

Formerly catalogued as Colbert MS 3821 and Bibliothèque du Roi MS 8086/3, this is a 15th-century paper manuscript with very little decoration, probably copied in Provence. The scribe's name was Johannes Conveli. It contains the prologue (La Divina Scriptura nos ensenha), the Hexateuch, Judges, Samuel, Kings, Tobit, Daniel (including the story of Susanna), Judith, Esther and Maccabees.

== Translation ==
This Bible of St Louis represents the highwater mark of early medieval translation from the Old Testament, a movement which is closely linked with the military orders and the crusade. The version of the book of Job is the oldest in any western vernacular language, and one of the finest.

The Acre Bible was translated from the Latin of the Vulgate version, not the original Hebrew. It is a "primitive" and "inelegant" translation, at times veering into paraphrase. Certain books are abridged, Deuteronomy most heavily, making it shorter than Judges.

Not all the books of the Acre Bible were translated anew into French. Three of them are 12th-century translations originating in England. The prologue to Judges in manuscript N says that it was translated on the orders of "Master Richard and Brother Otho" (maistre Richart et frere Othon), who can be identified with two Templars, Otho of Saint-Omer and Richard of Hastings. Otho was the master of the order's English province from 1153 to 1155, and Richard was his successor until 1185. There is no record of Otho after 1174, so Judges was probably translated between 1155 and 1174 in England. Richard traveled to Acre in 1185, probably bringing with him his copy of Judges, which passed to the Templar house in that city on his death. Samuel and Kings were combined in a 12th-century translation known as the Quatre livres des Rois, also from England. That translation dates to about 1170.

In other cases, the Acre Bible contains what seem to be revisions of already existing translations. Its Hexateuch, for example, bears strong similarity to that of the Anglo-Norman Bible. The former is not derived directly from the latter, but both share a common source.

The language of the Acre Bible contains Arabicisms and Occitanisms consistent with an origin in the Near East. This suggests that the compiling, editing and translation and not just the copying of the oldest manuscript was performed in the Kingdom of Jerusalem. Toponyms (e.g., Sayete for Sidon) indicate familiarity with contemporary crusader names. The Acre Bible "may have been sponsored by the king", but in its choice of what books to include, it "appears better fitted to the ideals of the aristocratic warriors who defended what little was left of the Kingdom of Jerusalem"

== Prologue and glosses ==
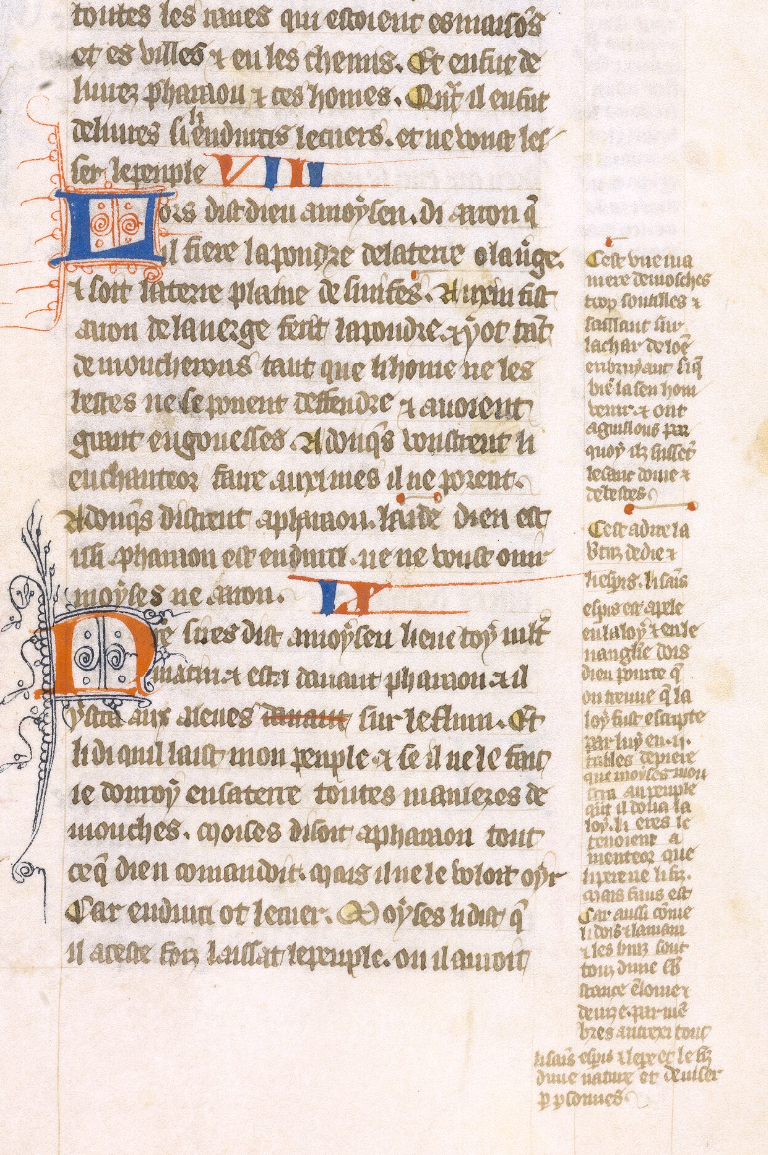
Decorated initials and a marginal gloss from manuscript C

The prologue is in octosyllabic verse. It may be of Anglo-Norman origin. In type, it is theological, as opposed to historical or philological.

Marginal glosses accompany the biblical text in manuscripts N and C. In the Occitan version, N^{2}, they have been incorporated into the text, albeit marked off by red lines or special letters. There are no glosses in the Arsenal copy, but they were part of the original compilation.

== Decoration ==
The Arsenal Bible measures only in 285 mm × 200 mm (11.2 in × 7.9 in), which indicates that it was intended for private use. It is a deluxe codex, fit for a royal patron. To Hugo Buchthal, it was "the crowning achievement of miniature painting" in the Kingdom of Jerusalem. (Note: This is an "audacious claim" in light of the Melisende Psalter (c. 1135).) It contains twenty large (usually full-page) miniatures, one at the start of each book (counting 1 and 2 Samuel, 1 and 2 Kings and the three divisions of Proverbs separately, but Maccabbees as one). It also has twenty large decorated initials, six of which are historiated.

There are two distinct styles of illustration. Nobel describes the illustrations as in the "Parisian style ... following Byzantine models." Buchthal refers to the "supremely intelligent and fruitful use of Byzantine models." C. A. Robson describes the illustrations accompanying the Hexateuch as Byzantine, but the rest of them as Parisian. The Byzantine style imitated is that of the 9th and 10th century. There is some affinity between the Arsenal style and the style of the frescos of Francis of Assisi in the old Franciscan church in Constantinople, executed between 1228 and 1261. Possibly the same artist worked in both cities.

The Arsenal Bible was influenced by the Oxford Bible Moralisée and the Morgan Picture Bible. Its scheme of illustrations has been compared to the stained glass in Sainte-Chapelle, also the work of Louis iX.

== Bibliography ==
=== Editions ===
- Nobel, Pierre, ed. (2006). La Bible d'Acre: Genèse et Exode, Édition critique d'après les manuscrits BNF nouv. acq. fr. 1404 et Arsenal 5211. Besançon: Presses universitaires de Franche-Comté.

=== Secondary literature ===
- Boase, T. S. R. (1977). "Ecclesiastical Art in the Crusader States in Palestine and Syria". In H. W. Hazard (ed.). A History of the Crusades, Volume IV: The Art and Architecture of the Crusader States. University of Wisconsin Press. pp. 69–139.
- Buchthal, Hugo (1957). Miniature Painting in the Latin Kingdom of Jerusalem. Oxford University Press.
- Cavagna, Mattia (2008). "Review of Pierre Nobel (ed.), La Bible d'Acre. Genèse et Exode" [Pierre Nobel (ed.), The Bible of Acre. Genesis and Exodus]. Cahiers de recherches médiévales et humanistes. doi:10.4000/crm.2711.
- Folda, Jaroslav (1977). "Painting and Sculpture in the Latin Kingdom of Jerusalem, 1099–1291". In H. W. Hazard (ed.). A History of the Crusades, Volume IV: The Art and Architecture of the Crusader States. University of Wisconsin Press. pp. 251–280.
- Folda, Jaroslav (2005). Crusader Art in the Holy Land, From the Third Crusade to the Fall of Acre. Cambridge University Press.
- Herman, Shael (2018). "The Acre Bible: Recasting Hebrew Scripture for Crusaders and the Christian Flock". Tulane European and Civil Law Forum. 33: 75–100.
- Lobrichon, Guy (2013). "The Story of a Success: The Bible historiale in French (1295–ca. 1500)". In Eyal Poleg; Laura Light (eds.). Form and Function in the Late Medieval Bible. Brill. pp. 307–331.
- Mann, Jackie (n.d.). "The Arsenal Bible as Relic: The Sanctity of the East in the West". Academia.edu.
- Muzerelle, Danielle (1995). "French Bible of Acre". In Marie-Hélène Tesniere; Prosser Gifford (eds.). Creating French Culture: Treasures from the Bibliothèque nationale de France. Yale University Press. pp. 63–65.
- Robson, C. A. (1969). "Vernacular Scriptures in France". In G. W. H. Lampe (ed.). The Cambridge History of the Bible. Vol. 2: The West from the Fathers to the Reformation. Cambridge University Press. pp. 436–451.
- Rubin, Jonathan (2018). Learning in a Crusader City: Intellectual Activity and Intercultural Exchanges in Acre, 1191–1291. Cambridge University Press.
- Sneddon, Clive R. (2012). "The Bible in French". In Richard Marsden; E. Ann Matter (eds.). The New Cambridge History of the Bible. Vol. 2: From 600 to 1450. Cambridge University Press. pp. 251–267.
- Szirmai, Julia C. (2008). "Review of Nobel 2006". Romania. 126 (501–502): 253–257.
