= A History of the Crusades: list of contributions =

List of contents and contributors to A History of the Crusades

A History of the Crusades, also known as the Wisconsin Collaborative History of the Crusades, is one of the most important books on the Crusades. The volumes, edited by Kenneth M. Setton, were published by the University of Wisconsin Press from 1969 to 1989 and consist of 89 chapters written by 64 prominent historians covering nearly 5000 pages.

- Epigraph. Deus vult, deus vult.
- Dedication. Dis manibus Johannis L. LaMonte et Danae C. Munro atque geniis adhus Florentibus Frederici Duncalf et Augusti C. Krey hoc opus dedicamus editores.

Some key features of the work are:

- The full range of subjects relevant to the Crusades is covered, from before 1095 until 1571.
- Index. Each volume has its own comprehensive index. There is a search feature associated with each volume found on the outline page. Also, there is a search feature that covers all six volumes.
- Bibliography. Each chapter includes a detailed bibliography in the notes beginning on its first page. In addition, there is a comprehensive bibliography at the end of Volume VI.
- Maps. Each volume includes maps and gazetteers which are listed at the front of the outline. Volume VI also includes a set of overview maps showing the theaters of operation of all the Crusades.
- Timelines. The first three volumes contain timelines relevant to their material. The timeline in Volume III covers all six volumes, 1049–1571.

The origins of the need for such a history was shown by American historian John L. La Monte in his Some Problems in Crusading Historiography. La Monte's leadership on the project ended with his death in 1949, and the lead was assumed by Setton at the University of Pennsylvania in 1950. The Routledge Companion to the Crusades ranks A History of the Crusades as one of the most comprehensive and monumental 20th-century works on the subject.

== Volume I. The First One Hundred Years ==
The first volume was edited by Marshall W. Baldwin and primarily covers the period from 1095–1187. Preliminary material discusses the situation in Western Europe, the Byzantine Empire and the Muslim world prior to that time. The material then includes the First Crusade, the establishment of the Kingdom of Jerusalem and Crusader States, the Fall of Edessa, the Second Crusade, and the Fall of Jerusalem to Saladin.

- Forward.
- Table of Contents.
- List of Illustrations.
- List of Maps.
- Frontispiece. Krak des Chevaliers.

Chapter I. Western Europe on the Eve of the Crusades. Sidney Painter, The Johns Hopkins University.

Chapter II. Conflict in the Mediterranean before the First Crusade.

- The Reconquest of Spain before 1095. Benjamin W. Wheeler, University of Michigan.
- The Italian Cities and Arabs before 1095. Hilmar C. Kreuger, University of Cincinnati.
- The Norman Conquest of Sicily. Robert S. Lopez, Yale University.
- The Pilgrimages to Palestine before 1095. Steven Runciman, London.

Chapter III. The Caliphate and the Arab States. Hamilton A. R. Gibb, Harvard University.

Chapter IV. The Ismā'īlites and the Assassins. Bernard Lewis, University of London.

Chapter V. The Turkish Invasion: The Selchükids. Claude Cahen, University of Strasbourg.

Chapter VI. The Byzantine Empire in the Eleventh Century. Peter Charanis, Rutgers University.

Chapter VII. The Councils of Piacenza and Clermont. Frederic Duncalf, University of Texas.

Chapter VIII. The First Crusade: Clermont to Constantinople. Frederic Duncalf, University of Texas.

Chapter IX. The First Crusade: Constantinople to Antioch. Steven Runciman, London.

Chapter X. The First Crusade: Antioch to Ascalon. Steven Runciman, London.

Chapter XI. The Crusade of 1101. James Lea Cate, University of Chicago.

Chapter XII. The Foundation of the Latin States, 1099–1118. Harold S. Fink. University of Tennessee.

Chapter XIII. The Growth of the Latin States, 1118–1144. Robert L. Nicholson. University of Illinois.

Chapter XIV. Zengi and the Fall of Edessa. Hamilton A. R. Gibb. Harvard University.

Chapter XV. The Second Crusade. Virginia G. Berry, Winnipeg, Canada.

Chapter XVI. The Career of Nūr-ad-Din. Hamiliton A. R. Gibb, Harvard University.

Chapter XVII. The Latin States under Baldwin III and Amalric I, 1143–1174. Marshall W. Baldwin, New York University.

Chapter XVIII. The Rise of Saladin. Hamiliton A. R. Gibb, Harvard University.

Chapter XIX. The Decline and Fall of Jerusalem, 1174–1189. Marshall W. Baldwin, New York University.

- Important Dates and Events, 1054–1189.
- Gazetteer, Volume I.
- Index to Volume I.

== Volume II. The Later Crusades, 1189–1311 ==
The second volume was edited by Robert L. Wolff and Harry W. Hazard and covers the period 1189–1311. This includes the later Crusades to the Holy Land: the Third through Eighth Crusades, the Barons' Crusade and Lord Edward's Crusade. The Albigensian Crusade and Children's Crusade are also covered. The Fall of Outremer resulting from the Siege of Acre conclude the work.

- Table of Contents.
- List of Illustrations.
- List of Maps.
- Frontispiece. The Four Tetrarchs, plundered by Venice during the sack of Constantinople in 1204.

Chapter I. The Norman Kingdom of Sicily and the Crusades. Helene Wieruszowski, The City College of New York.

Chapter II. The Third Crusade: Richard the Lionhearted and Philip Augustus. Sidney Painter, The Johns Hopkins University.

Chapter III. The Crusades of Frederick Barbarossa and Henry VI. Edgar N. Johnson, University of Massachusetts.

Chapter IV. Byzantium and the Crusades, 1081–1204. Joan M. Hussey, Royal Holloway College, University of London.

Chapter V. The Fourth Crusade. Edgar H. McNeal, Ohio State University, and Robert Lee Wolff, Harvard University.

Chapter VI. The Latin Empire of Constantinople, 1204–1261. Robert Lee Wolff, Harvard University.

Chapter VII. The Frankish States in Greece, 1204-1311. Jean Longnon, Bibliothèque de l'Institut de France.

Chapter VIII. The Albigensian Crusade. Austin P. Evans, Columbia University.

Chapter IX. The Children's Crusade. Norman P. Zacour, University of Toronto.

Chapter X. The Political Crusades of the Thirteenth Century. Joseph R. Strayer, Harvard University.

Chapter XI. The Fifth Crusade. Thomas C. Van Cleve, Bowdoin College.

Chapter XII. The Crusade of Frederick II. Thomas C. Van Cleve, Bowdoin College.

Chapter XIII. The Crusade of Theobald of Champagne and Richard of Cornwall, 1239–1241. Sidney Painter, The Johns Hopkins University.

Chapter XIV. The Crusades of Louis IX. Joseph R. Strayer, Harvard University.

Chapter XV. The Crusader States, 1192–1243. Mary Nickerson Hardwicke, Downey, California.

Chapter XVI. The Crusader States, 1243–1291. Steven Runciman, London.

Chapter XVII. The Kingdom of Cyprus, 1191–1291. Elizabeth Chapin Furber, Philadelphia.

Chapter XVIII. The Kingdom of Cilician Armenia. Sirarpie Der Nersessian, Dumbarton Oaks, Washington, DC.

Chapter XIX. The Turks in Iran and Anatolia before the Mongol Invasions. Claude Cahen, University of Strasbourg.

Chapter XX. The Aiyūbids. Hamiliton A. R. Gibb, Harvard University.

Chapter XXI. The Mongols and the Near East. Claude Cahen, University of Strasbourg.

Chapter XXII. The Mamluk Sultans to 1293. Mustafa M. Ziada, University of Cairo.

- Important Dates and Events, 1187–1311.
- Gazetteer, Volume II.
- Index to Volume II.

== Volume III. The Fourteenth and Fifteen Centuries ==
The third covers the later Crusades and was edited by Harry W. Hazard. This includes the Crusades after Acre, 1291–1399, the Crusades of the 15th century, and the Reconquista. Also covered are the Mongol invasions, the Northern Crusades, and the Ottoman Empire.

- Table of Contents.
- List of Maps.
- Frontispiece. Bertrandon de la Broquière offering to Philip the Good of Burgundy a translation of the Koran.

Chapter I. The Crusade in the Fourteenth Century. Aziz Suryal Atiya, University of Utah.

Chapter II. Byzantium and the Crusades, 1261–1354. Deno Geanakoplos, Yale University.

Chapter III. Byzantium and the Crusades, 1354–1453. Deno Geanakoplos, Yale University.

Chapter IV. The Morea, 1311–1364. Peter Topping, University of Cincinnati.

Chapter V. The Morea, 1364–1460. Peter Topping, The University of Cincinnati.

Chapter VI. The Catalans in Greece, 1311–1380. Kenneth M. Setton, Institute for Advanced Study.

Chapter VII. The Catalans and Florentines in Greece, 1380–1462. Kenneth M. Setton, Institute for Advanced Study.

Chapter VIII. The Hospitallers at Rhodes, 1306–1421. Anthony Luttrell, The Royal University of Malta.

Chapter IX. The Hospitallers at Rhodes, 1421–1523. Ettore Rossi.

Chapter X. The Kingdom of Cyprus, 1291–1369. Sir Harry Luke, KCMG.

Chapter XI. The Kingdom of Cyprus, 1369–1489. Sir Harry Luke, KCMG.

Chapter XII. The Spanish and Portuguese Reconquest, 1095–1492. Charles J. Bishko.

Chapter XIII. Moslem North Africa, 1049–1394. Harry W. Hazard, Institute for Advanced Study.

Chapter XIV. The Mamluk Sultans, 1291–1517. Mustafa M. Ziadat, University of Cairo.

Chapter XV. The Mongols and Western Europe. Denis Sinor, Indiana University.

Chapter XVI. The German Crusade on the Baltic. Edgar N. Johnson, University of Nebraska.

Chapter XVII. The Crusades against the Hussites. Frederick G. Heymann, University of Calgary.

Chapter XVIII. The Aftermath of the Crusades. Aziz Suryal Atiya, University of Utah.

- Important Dates and Events, 1049–1571.
- Gazetteer, Volume III.
- Index to Volume III.

== Volume IV. The Art and Architecture of the Crusader States ==
The fourth volume covers the art and archicture of the Crusader states and was edited by Harry W. Hazard. Related articles include art of the Crusades, art and architecture of the Crusader states and Holy places in the Levant,

- Table of Contents.
- List of Figures.
- List of Plates.
- List of Maps.
- Frontispiece. Church of the Holy Sepulcher, Jerusalem, South Façade.

Chapter I. Life among the Europeans in Palestine and Syria in the Twelfth and Thirteenth Centuries. Urban T. Holmes, Jr., University of North Carolina.

Chapter II. Pilgrimages and Pilgrim Shrines in Palestine and Syria after 1095. Henry L. Savage, Princeton University.

Chapter III. Ecclesiastical Art in the Crusader States in Palestine and Syria. T. S. R. Boase, Oxford University.

- Architecture and Sculpture.
- Mosaic, Painting, and Minor Arts.

Chapter IV. Military Architecture in the Crusader States in Palestine and Syria. T. S. R. Boase, Oxford University.

Chapter V. The Arts in Cyprus.

- Ecclesiastical Art. T. S. R. Boase, Oxford University.
- Military Architecture. A. H. S. Megaw, British School at Athens.

Chapter VI. The Arts in Frankish Greece and Rhodes.

- Frankish Greece. David J. Wallace and T. S. R. Boase
- Rhodes. T. S. R. Boase

Chapter VII. Painting and Sculpture in the Latin Kingdom of Jerusalem, 1099-1291. Jaroslav Folda, University of North Carolina.

Crusader Art and Architecture: A Photographic Survey. Jaroslav Folda, University of North Carolina.

- Gazetteer, Volume IV.
- Index to Volume IV.

== Volume V. The Impact of the Crusades on the Near East ==
The fifth volume covers the impact of the Crusades on the Near East and was edited by Norman P. Zacour and Harry W. Hazard.

- Table of Contents.
- List of Illustrations.
- List of Maps.
- Frontispiece. Francis of Assisi before al-Kāmil, sultan of Egypt. Courtesy of Fratelli Fabri, Milan.

Chapter I. Arab Culture in the Twelfth Century. Nabih Amin Faris, American University of Beirut.

Chapter II. The Impact of the Crusades on Moslem Lands. Philip Khuri Hitti, Princeton University.

Chapter III. Social Classes in the Crusader States: the "Minorities". Joshua Prawer, The Hebrew University of Jerusalem.

Chapter IV. Social Classes in the Latin Kingdom: the Franks. Joshua Prawer.

Chapter V. The Political and Ecclesiastical Organization of the Crusader States. Jean Richard, Université de Dijon.

Chapter VI. Agricultural Conditions in the Crusader States. Jean Richard.

Chapter VII. The Population of the Crusader States. Josiah C. Russell, Texas A&I University.

Chapter VIII. The Teutonic Knights in the Crusader States. Indrikis Sterns, Muhlenberg College.

Chapter IX. Venice and the Crusades. Louise Buenger Robbert, University of Missouri.

Chapter X. Missions to the East in the Thirteenth and Fourteenth Centuries. Marshall W. Baldwin, New York University.

- Gazetteer, Volume V.
- Index to Volume V.

== Volume VI. The Impact of the Crusades on Europe ==
The sixth volume covers the impact of the Crusades on Europe and was edited by Norman P. Zacour and Harry W. Hazard.

- Table of Contents.
- List of Maps.
- Maps of theaters of war of the Crusades. Compiled by Harry W. Hazard and executed by the Cartographic Laboratory of the University of Wisconsin, Madison.
- Frontispiece. Mehmed II, "the Conqueror." Portrait by Gentile Bellini, National Gallery, London.

Chapter I. The Legal and Political Theory of the Crusade. Norman Daniel, Cairo.

Chapter II. Crusade Propaganda. Norman Daniel.

Chapter III. The Epic Cycle of the Crusades. Alfred Foulet, Princeton University.

Chapter IV. Financing the Crusades. Fred A. Cazel, Jr., University of Connecticut.

Chapter V. The Institutions of the Kingdom of Cyprus. Jean Richard, Université de Dijon.

Chapter VI. Social Evolution in Latin Greece. David Jacoby, The Hebrew University of Jerusalem.

Chapter VII. The Ottoman Turks and the Crusades, 1329–1451. Halil İnalcık, University of Chicago.

Chapter VIII. The Crusade of Varna. Martin Chasin, Bridgeport, Connecticut.

Chapter IX. The Ottoman Turks and the Crusades, 1451–1522. Halil İnalcık.

Chapter X. Crusader Coinage with Greek or Latin Inscription. John Porteous.

- Corpus of Coins.

Chapter XI. Crusader Coinage with Arabic Inscriptions. Michael Brown and D. M. Metcalf.

- List of Coins, Illustrated.

Select Bibliography of the Crusades. Hans E. Mayer and Helen McLellan.

- Gazetteer, Volume VI.
- Index to Volume VI.

== List of authors ==
List of contributors to this work:

- Aziz Suryal Atiya
- Marshall W. Baldwin
- Virginia G. Berry
- Charles J. Bishko
- T. S. R. Boase
- Michael Brown
- Claude Cahen
- James Lea Cate
- Fred A. Cazel, Jr.
- Peter Charanis
- Martin Chasin
- Norman Daniel
- Frederic Duncalf
- Austin P. Evans
- Nabih Amin Faris
- Harold S. Fink
- Jaroslav Folda
- Alfred Foulet
- Elizabeth Chapin Furber
- Deno Geanakoplos
- Hamilton A. R. Gibb
- Mary Nickerson Hardwicke
- Harry W. Hazard
- Frederick G. Heymann
- Philip Khuri Hitti
- Urban T. Holmes, Jr.
- Joan M. Hussey
- Halil İnalcık
- David Jacoby
- Edgar N. Johnson
- Hilmar C. Kreuger
- Bernard Lewis
- Jean Longnon
- Robert S. Lopez
- Harry Luke
- Anthony Luttrell
- Hans E. Mayer
- Helen McLellan
- Edgar H. McNeal
- A. H. S. Megaw
- D. M. Metcalf
- Sirarpie Der Nersessian
- Robert L. Nicholson
- Sidney Painter
- John Porteous
- Joshua Prawer
- Jean Richard
- Louise Buenger Robbert
- Ettore Rossi
- Steven Runciman
- Josiah C. Russell
- Henry L. Savage
- Kenneth M. Setton
- Denis Sinor
- Indrikis Sterns
- Joseph R. Strayer
- Peter Topping
- Thomas C. Van Cleve
- David J. Wallace
- Benjamin W. Wheeler
- Helene Wieruszowski
- Robert Lee Wolff
- Norman P. Zacour
- Mustafa M. Ziada

== Bibliography ==
- Atiya, Aziz Suryal (1975a). "The Crusade in the Fourteenth Century" (PDF). The Fourteenth and Fifteenth Centuries. pp. 3–26. Archived from the original (PDF) on 2023-01-04.
- Atiya, Aziz Suryal (1975b). "The Aftermath of the Crusades" (PDF). The Fourteenth and Fifteenth Centuries. pp. 647–666. Archived from the original (PDF) on 2023-01-04.
- Baldwin, Marshall W., ed. (1969a). The First Hundred Years. Setton, Kenneth M. (ed.), A History of the Crusades, University of Wisconsin Press. ISBN 9780299048341.
- Baldwin, Marshall W. (1969b). "The Latin States under Baldwin III and Amalric I, 1143–1174" (PDF). The First Hundred Years. pp. 528–562. Archived from the original (PDF) on 2023-01-04.
- Baldwin, Marshall W. (1969c). "The Decline and Fall of Jerusalem, 1174-1189" (PDF). The First Hundred Years. pp. 590–621. Archived from the original (PDF) on 2023-01-04.
- Baldwin, Marshall W. (1985). "Missions to the East in the Thirteenth and Fourteenth Centuries" (PDF). The Impact of the Crusades on the Near East. pp. 452–518. Archived from the original (PDF) on 2023-01-04.
- Berry, Virginia G. (1969). "The Second Crusade" (PDF). The First Hundred Years. pp. 463–512. Archived from the original (PDF) on 2023-01-04.
- Bishko, Charles J. (1975). "The Spanish and Portuguese Reconquest, 1095–1492" (PDF). The Fourteenth and Fifteenth Centuries. pp. 396–456. Archived from the original (PDF) on 2023-01-04.
- Boase, T. S. R. (1979a). "Ecclesiastical Art in the Crusader States in Palestine and Syria" (PDF). The Art and Architecture of the Crusader States. pp. 69–116. Archived from the original (PDF) on 2023-01-04.
- Boase, T. S. R. (1979b). "Military Architecture in the Crusader States in Palestine and Syria" (PDF). The Art and Architecture of the Crusader States. pp. 140–164. Archived from the original (PDF) on 2023-01-04.
- Boase, T. S. R.; Megaw, A. H. S. (1979). "The Arts in Cyprus" (PDF). The Art and Architecture of the Crusader States. pp. 165–207. Archived from the original (PDF) on 2023-01-04.
- Boase, T. S. R.; Wallace, David J. (1979). "The Arts in Frankish Greece and Rhodes" (PDF). The Art and Architecture of the Crusader States. pp. 208–250. Archived from the original (PDF) on 2023-01-04.
- Brown, Michael L.; Metcalf, D. M. (1989a). "Crusader Coinage with Arabic Inscriptions" (PDF). Impact of the Crusades on Europe. pp. 421–473. Archived from the original (PDF) on 2023-01-04.
- Brown, Michael L.; Metcalf, D. M. (1989b). "List of Coins Illustrated" (PDF). Impact of the Crusades on Europe. pp. 474–482. Archived from the original (PDF) on 2023-01-04.
- Cahen, Claude (1969a). "The Turkish Invasion: The Selchükids" (PDF). The First Hundred Years. pp. 135–176. Archived from the original (PDF) on 2023-01-04.
- Cahen, Claude (1969b). "The Turks in Iran and Anatolia before the Mongol Invasions" (PDF). The Later Crusades, 1189–1311. pp. 661–692. Archived from the original (PDF) on 2023-01-04.
- Cahen, Claude (1969c). "The Mongols and the Near East" (PDF). The Later Crusades, 1189–1311. pp. 715–734. Archived from the original (PDF) on 2023-01-04.
- Cate, James L. (1969). "The Crusade of 1101" (PDF). The First Hundred Years. pp. 343–367. Archived from the original (PDF) on 2023-01-04.
- Cazel Jr., Fred A. (1989). "Financing the Crusades" (PDF). Impact of the Crusades on Europe. Univ of Wisconsin Press. pp. 116–149. ISBN 978-0-299-10744-4. Archived from the original (PDF) on 2023-01-04.
- Charanis, Peter (1969). "The Byzantine Empire in the Eleventh Century" (PDF). The First Hundred Years. Univ of Wisconsin Press. pp. 177–219. ISBN 978-0-299-04834-1. Archived from the original (PDF) on 2023-01-04.
- Chasin, Martin (1989). "The Crusade of Varna" (PDF). Impact of the Crusades on Europe. Univ of Wisconsin Press. pp. 276–310. ISBN 978-0-299-10744-4. Archived from the original (PDF) on 2023-01-04.
- Daniel, Norman (1989a). "The Legal and Political Theory of the Crusade" (PDF). Impact of the Crusades on Europe. Univ of Wisconsin Press. pp. 3–38. ISBN 978-0-299-10744-4. Archived from the original (PDF) on 2023-01-04.
- Daniel, Norman (1989b). "Crusade Propaganda" (PDF). Impact of the Crusades on Europe. Univ of Wisconsin Press. pp. 39–97. ISBN 978-0-299-10744-4. Archived from the original (PDF) on 2023-01-04.
- Duncalf, Frederic (1969a). "The Councils of Piacenza and Clermont" (PDF). The First Hundred Years. Univ of Wisconsin Press. pp. 220–252. ISBN 978-0-299-04834-1. Archived from the original (PDF) on 2023-01-04.
- Duncalf, Frederic (1969b). "The First Crusade: Clermont to Constantinople" (PDF). The First Hundred Years. Univ of Wisconsin Press. pp. 253–279. ISBN 978-0-299-04834-1. Archived from the original (PDF) on 2023-01-04.
- Evans, Austin P. (1969). "The Albigensian Crusade" (PDF). The Later Crusades, 1189–1311. Univ of Wisconsin Press. pp. 277–324. ISBN 978-0-299-04844-0. Archived from the original (PDF) on 2015-02-19.
- Faris, Nahib Amin (1985). "Arab Culture in the Twelfth Century" (PDF). The Impact of the Crusades on the Near East. pp. 3–32. Archived from the original (PDF) on 2023-01-04.
- Fink, Harold S. (1969). "The Foundation of the Latin States, 1099–1118" (PDF). The First Hundred Years. pp. 368–409. Archived from the original (PDF) on 2023-01-04.
- Folda, Jaroslav (1979a). "Painting and Sculpture in the Latin Kingdom of Jerusalem, 1099-1291" (PDF). The Art and Architecture of the Crusader States. pp. 251–280. Archived from the original (PDF) on 2023-01-04.
- Folda, Jaroslav (1979b). "Crusader Art and Architecture: A Photographic Survey" (PDF). The Art and Architecture of the Crusader States. pp. 281–354. Archived from the original (PDF) on 2023-01-04.
- Foulet, Alfred (1989). "The Epic Cycle of the Crusades" (PDF). Impact of the Crusades on Europe. pp. 98–115. Archived from the original (PDF) on 2023-01-04.
- Furber, Elizabeth Chapin (1969). "The Kingdom of Cyprus, 1191–1291" (PDF). The Later Crusades, 1189–1311. pp. 599–629. Archived from the original (PDF) on 2023-01-04.
- Geanakoplos, Deno (1975a). "Byzantium and the Crusades, 1261–1354" (PDF). The Fourteenth and Fifteenth Centuries. pp. 27–68. Archived from the original (PDF) on 2023-01-04.
- Geanakoplos, Deno (1975b). "Byzantium and the Crusades, 1354–1453" (PDF). The Fourteenth and Fifteenth Centuries. pp. 69–103. Archived from the original (PDF) on 2023-01-04.
- Gibb, Hamilton A. R. (1969a). "The Caliphate and the Arab States" (PDF). The First Hundred Years. pp. 81–98. Archived from the original (PDF) on 2023-01-04.
- Gibb, Hamilton A. R. (1969b). "Zengi and the Fall of Edessa" (PDF). The First Hundred Years. pp. 449–462. Archived from the original (PDF) on 2023-01-04.
- Gibb, H. A. R. (1969c). "The Career of Nūr-ad-Din" (PDF). The First Hundred Years. pp. 513–527. Archived from the original (PDF) on 2023-01-04.
- Gibb, H. A. R. (1969d). "The Rise of Saladin" (PDF). The First Hundred Years. pp. 563–589. Archived from the original (PDF) on 2023-01-04.
- Gibb, H. A. R. (1969e). "The Aiyūbids" (PDF). The Later Crusades, 1189–1311. pp. 693–714. Archived from the original (PDF) on 2023-01-04.
- Hardwicke, Mary Nickerson (1969). "The Crusader States, 1192–1243" (PDF). The Later Crusades, 1189–1311. pp. 522–556. Archived from the original (PDF) on 2023-01-04.
- Hazard, Harry W., ed. (1975a). The Fourteenth and Fifteen Centuries. Setton, Kenneth M. (ed.), A History of the Crusades, University of Wisconsin Press. ISBN 9780299066741.
- Hazard, Harry W. (1975b). "Moslem North Africa, 1049–1394" (PDF). The Fourteenth and Fifteenth Centuries. pp. 457–485. Archived from the original (PDF) on 2023-01-04.
- Hazard, Harry W. (1989). "Maps of Crusader Theaters of War" (PDF). Impact of the Crusades on Europe. Archived from the original (PDF) on 2023-01-04.
- Hazard, Harry W., ed. (1979). The Art and Architecture of the Crusader States. Setton, Kenneth M. (ed.), A History of the Crusades, University of Wisconsin Press. ISBN 9780299068240.
- Heymann, Frederick G. (1975). "The Crusades against the Hussites" (PDF). The Fourteenth and Fifteenth Centuries. pp. 586–646. Archived from the original (PDF) on 2023-01-04.
- Hitti, Philip Khuri (1985). "The Impact of the Crusades on Moslem Lands" (PDF). The Impact of the Crusades on the Near East. pp. 33–58. Archived from the original (PDF) on 2023-01-04.
- Holmes Jr., Urban T. (1979). "Life among the Europeans in Palestine and Syria in the Twelfth and Thirteenth Centuries" (PDF). The Art and Architecture of the Crusader States. pp. 3–35. Archived from the original (PDF) on 2023-01-04.
- Hussey, Joan M. (1969). "Byzantium and the Crusades, 1081–1204" (PDF). The Later Crusades, 1189–1311. pp. 123–152. Archived from the original (PDF) on 2023-01-04.
- İnalcık, Halil (1989a). "The Ottoman Turks and the Crusades, 1329–1451" (PDF). Impact of the Crusades on Europe. pp. 222–275. Archived from the original (PDF) on 2023-01-04.
- İnalcık, Halil (1989b). "The Ottoman Turks and the Crusades, 1451–1522" (PDF). Impact of the Crusades on Europe. pp. 311–353. Archived from the original (PDF) on 2023-01-04.
- Jacoby, David (1989). "Social Evolution in Latin Greece" (PDF). Impact of the Crusades on Europe. pp. 175–221. Archived from the original (PDF) on 2023-01-04.
- Johnson, Edgar N. (1969). "The Crusades of Frederick Barbarossa and Henry VI" (PDF). The Later Crusades, 1189–1311. pp. 87–122. Archived from the original (PDF) on 2023-01-04.
- Johnson, Edgar N. (1975). "The German Crusade on the Baltic" (PDF). The Fourteenth and Fifteenth Centuries. pp. 545–585. Archived from the original (PDF) on 2023-01-04.
- Lewis, Bernard (1969). "The Ismā'īlites and the Assassins" (PDF). The First Hundred Years. pp. 99–134. Archived from the original (PDF) on 2023-01-04.
- Longnon, Jean (1969). "The Frankish States in Greece, 1204–1311" (PDF). The Later Crusades, 1189–1311. pp. 235–276. Archived from the original (PDF) on 2023-01-04.
- Luke, Harry (1975a). "The Kingdom of Cyprus, 1291–1369" (PDF). The Fourteenth and Fifteenth Centuries. pp. 340–360. Archived from the original (PDF) on 2023-01-04.
- Luke, Harry (1975b). "The Kingdom of Cyprus, 1369–1489" (PDF). The Fourteenth and Fifteenth Centuries. pp. 361–395. Archived from the original (PDF) on 2023-01-04.
- Luttrell, Anthony (1975). "The Hospitallers at Rhodes, 1306–1421" (PDF). The Fourteenth and Fifteenth Centuries. pp. 278–313. Archived from the original (PDF) on 2023-01-04.
- Mayer, Hans E.; McLellan, Helen (1989). "Select Bibliography of the Crusades" (PDF). In Hazard, Harry (ed.). VI. Impact of the Crusades on Europe. pp. 511–664. Archived from the original (PDF) on 2023-01-04.
- McNeal, Edgar H.; Wolff, Robert Lee (1969). "The Fourth Crusade" (PDF). The Later Crusades, 1189–1311. pp. 153–186. Archived from the original (PDF) on 2023-01-04.
- Nersessian, Sirarpie Der (1969). "The Kingdom of Cilician Armenia" (PDF). The Later Crusades, 1189–1311. pp. 630–660. Archived from the original (PDF) on 2023-01-04.
- Nicholson, Robert L. (1969). "The Growth of the Latin States, 1118–1144" (PDF). The First Hundred Years. pp. 410–448. Archived from the original (PDF) on 2023-01-04.
- Painter, Sidney (1969a). "Western Europe on the Eve of the Crusades" (PDF). The First Hundred Years. pp. 3–30. Archived from the original (PDF) on 2023-01-04.
- Painter, Sidney (1969b). "The Third Crusade: Richard the Lionhearted and Philip Augustus" (PDF). The Later Crusades, 1189–1311. pp. 45–86. Archived from the original (PDF) on 2023-01-04.
- Painter, Sidney (1969c). "The Crusade of Theobald of Champagne and Richard of Cornwall, 1239-1241" (PDF). The Later Crusades, 1189–1311. pp. 463–486. Archived from the original (PDF) on 2023-01-04.
- Porteous, John (1989a). "Crusader Coinage with Greek or Latin Inscription" (PDF). Impact of the Crusades on Europe. pp. 354–387. Archived from the original (PDF) on 2023-01-04.
- Porteous, John (1989b). "Corpus of Coins" (PDF). Impact of the Crusades on Europe. Univ of Wisconsin Press. pp. 388–420. ISBN 978-0-299-10744-4. Archived from the original (PDF) on 2023-01-04.
- Prawer, Joshua (1985a). "Social Classes in the Crusader States: the "Minorities"" (PDF). The Impact of the Crusades on the Near East. Univ of Wisconsin Press. pp. 59–116. ISBN 978-0-299-09144-6. Archived from the original (PDF) on 2023-01-04.
- Prawer, Joshua (1985b). "Social Classes in the Latin Kingdom: the Franks" (PDF). The Impact of the Crusades on the Near East. Univ of Wisconsin Press. pp. 192–250. ISBN 978-0-299-09144-6. Archived from the original (PDF) on 2023-01-04.
- Richard, Jean (1985a). "The Political and Ecclesiastical Organization of the Crusader States" (PDF). The Impact of the Crusades on the Near East. Univ of Wisconsin Press. pp. 193–250. ISBN 978-0-299-09144-6. Archived from the original (PDF) on 2023-01-04.
- Richard, Jean (1985b). "Agricultural Conditions in the Crusader States" (PDF). The Impact of the Crusades on the Near East. Univ of Wisconsin Press. pp. 251–294. ISBN 978-0-299-09144-6. Archived from the original (PDF) on 2023-01-04.
- Richard, Jean (1989). "The Institutions of the Kingdom of Cyprus" (PDF). Impact of the Crusades on Europe. Univ of Wisconsin Press. pp. 150–174. ISBN 978-0-299-10744-4. Archived from the original (PDF) on 2023-01-04.
- Robbert, Louise Buenger (1985). "Venice and the Crusades" (PDF). The Impact of the Crusades on the Near East. Univ of Wisconsin Press. pp. 379–451. ISBN 978-0-299-09144-6. Archived from the original (PDF) on 2023-01-04.
- Rossi, Ettore (1975). "The Hospitallers at Rhodes, 1421–1523" (PDF). The Fourteenth and Fifteenth Centuries. pp. 314–339. Archived from the original (PDF) on 2023-01-04.
- Runciman, Steven (1969a). "The First Crusade: Constantinople to Antioch" (PDF). The First Hundred Years. pp. 280–307. Archived from the original (PDF) on 2023-01-04.
- Runciman, Steven (1969b). "The First Crusade: Antioch to Ascalon" (PDF). The First Hundred Years. pp. 308–342. Archived from the original (PDF) on 2023-01-04.
- Runciman, Steven (1969c). "The Crusader States, 1243–1291" (PDF). The Later Crusades, 1189–1311. pp. 557–598. Archived from the original (PDF) on 2023-01-04.
- Russell, Josiah C. (1985). "The Population of the Crusader States" (PDF). The Impact of the Crusades on the Near East. pp. 295–314. Archived from the original (PDF) on 2023-01-04.
- Savage, Henry L. (1979). "Pilgrimages and Pilgrim Shrines in Palestine and Syria after 1095" (PDF). The Art and Architecture of the Crusader States. pp. 36–68. Archived from the original (PDF) on 2023-01-04.
- Setton, Kenneth M. (1969–1989). A History of the Crusades. Madison: University of Wisconsin Press.
- Setton, Kenneth M. (1969). "Forward" (PDF). The First Hundred Years. Archived from the original (PDF) on 2024-05-13.
- Setton, Kenneth (1975a). "The Catalans in Greece, 1311–1380" (PDF). The Fourteenth and Fifteenth Centuries. pp. 167–224. Archived from the original (PDF) on 2023-01-04.
- Setton, Kenneth (1975b). "The Catalans and Florentines in Greece, 1380–1462" (PDF). The Fourteenth and Fifteenth Centuries. pp. 225–277. Archived from the original (PDF) on 2023-01-04.
- Sinor, Denis (1975). "The Mongols and Western Europe" (PDF). The Fourteenth and Fifteenth Centuries. pp. 513–544. Archived from the original (PDF) on 2023-01-04.
- Sterns, Indrikis (1985). "The Teutonic Knights in the Crusader States" (PDF). The Impact of the Crusades on the Near East. pp. 315–378. Archived from the original (PDF) on 2023-01-04.
- Strayer, Joseph R. (1969a). "The Political Crusades of the Thirteenth Century" (PDF). The Later Crusades, 1189–1311. pp. 343–376. Archived from the original (PDF) on 2023-01-04.
- Strayer, Joseph R. (1969b). "The Crusades of Louis IX" (PDF). The Later Crusades, 1189–1311. pp. 487–521. Archived from the original (PDF) on 2023-01-04.
- Topping, Peter (1975a). "The Morea, 1311–1364" (PDF). The Fourteenth and Fifteenth Centuries. pp. 104–140. Archived from the original (PDF) on 2023-01-04.
- Topping, Peter (1975b). "The Morea, 1364–1460" (PDF). The Fourteenth and Fifteenth Centuries. pp. 141–166. Archived from the original (PDF) on 2023-01-04.
- Van Cleve, Thomas C. (1969a). "The Fifth Crusade" (PDF). The Later Crusades, 1189–1311. pp. 377–428. Archived from the original (PDF) on 2023-01-04.
- Van Cleve, Thomas C. (1969b). "The Crusade of Frederick II" (PDF). The Later Crusades, 1189–1311. pp. 429–462. Archived from the original (PDF) on 2023-01-04.
- Wheeler, Benjamin W.; Kreuger, Hilmar C.; Lopez, Robert S.; Runciman, Steven (1969). "Conflict in the Mediterranean before the First Crusade" (PDF). The First Hundred Years. pp. 31–80. Archived from the original (PDF) on 2021-08-27.
- Wieruszowski, Helene (1969). "The Norman Kingdom of Sicily and the Crusades" (PDF). The Later Crusades, 1189–1311. pp. 3–44. Archived from the original (PDF) on 2023-01-04.
- Wolff, Robert L. (1969). "The Latin Empire of Constantinople, 1204–1261" (PDF). The Later Crusades, 1189–1311. pp. 187–234. Archived from the original (PDF) on 2023-01-04.
- Wolff, Robert L.; Hazard, Harry W., eds. (1969). The Later Crusades, 1189–1311. Setton, Kenneth M. (ed.), A History of the Crusades, University of Wisconsin Press. ISBN 9780299048440.
- Zacour, Norman P. (1969). "The Children's Crusade" (PDF). The Later Crusades, 1189–1311. pp. 325–342. Archived from the original (PDF) on 2024-06-05.
- Zacour, Norman P.; Hazard, Harry W., eds. (1985). The Impact of the Crusades on the Near East. Setton, Kenneth M. (ed.), A History of the Crusades, University of Wisconsin Press. ISBN 9780299091446.
- Zacour, Norman P.; Hazard, Harry W., eds. (1989). The Impact of the Crusades on Europe. Setton, Kenneth M. (ed.), A History of the Crusades, University of Wisconsin Press. ISBN 9780299107444.
- Ziada, Mustafa M. (1969). "The Mamluk Sultans to 1293" (PDF). The Later Crusades, 1189–1311. Univ of Wisconsin Press. pp. 735–758. ISBN 978-0-299-04844-0. Archived from the original (PDF) on 2023-01-04.
- Ziada, Mustafa M. (1975). "The Mamluk Sultans, 1291–1517" (PDF). The Fourteenth and Fifteenth Centuries. Univ of Wisconsin Press. pp. 486–512. ISBN 978-0-299-06670-3. Archived from the original (PDF) on 2023-01-04.

== Supporting Material ==
- Contents, Volume I (1969a). "Contents, Volume I" (PDF). The First Hundred Years. Univ of Wisconsin Press. ISBN 978-0-299-04834-1. Archived from the original (PDF) on 2023-01-04.
- Contents, Volume II (1969b). "Contents, Volume II" (PDF). The Later Crusades, 1189–1311. Univ of Wisconsin Press. ISBN 978-0-299-04844-0. Archived from the original (PDF) on 2023-01-04.
- Contents, Volume III (1975). "Contents, Volume III" (PDF). The Fourteenth and Fifteenth Centuries. Univ of Wisconsin Press. ISBN 978-0-299-06670-3. Archived from the original (PDF) on 2023-01-04.
- Contents, Volume IV (1979). "Contents, Volume IV" (PDF). The Art and Architecture of the Crusader States. Archived from the original (PDF) on 2023-01-04.
- Contents, Volume V (1985). "Contents, Volume V" (PDF). The Impact of the Crusades on the Near East. Archived from the original (PDF) on 2023-01-04.
- Contents, Volume VI (1989). "Contents, Volume VI" (PDF). Impact of the Crusades on Europe. Archived from the original (PDF) on 2023-01-04.
- Dedication (1969). "Dedication" (PDF). The First Hundred Years. Archived from the original (PDF) on 2023-01-04.
- Epigraph (1969). "Deus vult, deus vult" (PDF). The First Hundred Years. Archived from the original (PDF) on 2023-01-04.
- Figures, Volume IV (1979). "Figures, Volume IV" (PDF). The Art and Architecture of the Crusader States. Archived from the original (PDF) on 2023-01-04.
- Frontispiece, Volume I (1969a). "Krak des Chevaliers" (PDF). The First Hundred Years. Archived from the original (PDF) on 2023-01-04.
- Frontispiece, Volume II (1969b). "The Four Tetrarchs, Venice" (PDF). The Later Crusades, 1189–1311. Archived from the original (PDF) on 2023-01-04.
- Frontispiece, Volume III (1975). "Bertrandon de la Broquière offering to Philip the Good" (PDF). The Fourteenth and Fifteenth Centuries. Archived from the original (PDF) on 2023-01-04.
- Frontispiece, Volume IV (1979). "Church of the Holy Sepulcher, Jerusalem, south façade" (PDF). The Art and Architecture of the Crusader States. Archived from the original (PDF) on 2023-01-04.
- Frontispiece, Volume V (1985). "Francis of Assisi before al-Kāmil, sultan of Egypt" (PDF). The Impact of the Crusades on the Near East. Archived from the original (PDF) on 2023-01-04.
- Frontispiece, Volume VI (1989). "Mehmed II, "the Conqueror."" (PDF). Impact of the Crusades on Europe. Archived from the original (PDF) on 2023-01-04.
- Gazetteer, Volume I (1969a). "Gazetteer and Note on Maps, Volume I" (PDF). The First Hundred Years. pp. 626–666. Archived from the original (PDF) on 2023-01-04.
- Gazetteer, Volume II (1969b). "Gazetteer, Volume II" (PDF). The Later Crusades, 1189–1311. Archived from the original (PDF) on 2023-01-04.
- Gazetteer, Volume III (1975). "Gazetteer, Volume III" (PDF). The Fourteenth and Fifteenth Centuries. pp. 677–736. Archived from the original (PDF) on 2023-01-04.
- Gazetteer, Volume IV (1979). "Gazetteer, Volume IV" (PDF). The Art and Architecture of the Crusader States. pp. 355–386. Archived from the original (PDF) on 2023-01-04.
- Gazetteer, Volume V (1985). "Gazetteer, Volume V" (PDF). The Impact of the Crusades on the Near East. pp. 519–552. Archived from the original (PDF) on 2023-01-04.
- Gazetteer, Volume VI (1989). "Gazetteer, Volume VI" (PDF). Impact of the Crusades on Europe. pp. 483–510. Archived from the original (PDF) on 2023-01-04.
- Illustrations, Volume I (1969a). "Illustrations, Volume I" (PDF). The First Hundred Years. Archived from the original (PDF) on 2023-01-04.
- Illustrations, Volume II (1969b). "Illustrations, Volume II" (PDF). The Later Crusades, 1189–1311. Archived from the original (PDF) on 2023-01-04.
- Illustrations, Volume V (1985). "Illustrations, Volume V" (PDF). The Impact of the Crusades on the Near East. Archived from the original (PDF) on 2023-01-04.
- Index, Volume I (1969a). "Index, Volume I" (PDF). The First Hundred Years. pp. 667–707. Archived from the original (PDF) on 2023-01-04.
- Index, Volume II (1969b). "Index, Volume II" (PDF). The Later Crusades, 1189–1311. Archived from the original (PDF) on 2023-01-04.
- Index, Volume III (1975). "Index, Volume III" (PDF). The Fourteenth and Fifteenth Centuries. pp. 737–813. Archived from the original (PDF) on 2023-01-04.}
- Index, Volume IV (1979). "Index, Volume IV" (PDF). The Art and Architecture of the Crusader States. pp. 387–414. Archived from the original (PDF) on 2023-01-04.
- Index, Volume V (1985). "Index, Volume V" (PDF). The Impact of the Crusades on the Near East. pp. 553–599. Archived from the original (PDF) on 2023-01-04.
- Index, Volume VI (1989). "Index, Volume VI" (PDF). Impact of the Crusades on Europe. pp. 665–703. Archived from the original (PDF) on 2023-01-04.
- Maps, Volume I (1969a). "Maps, Volume I" (PDF). The First Hundred Years. Archived from the original (PDF) on 2023-01-04.
- Maps, Volume II (1969b). "Maps, Volume II" (PDF). The Later Crusades, 1189–1311. Archived from the original (PDF) on 2023-01-04.
- Maps, Volume III (1975). "Maps, Volume III" (PDF). The Fourteenth and Fifteenth Centuries. Archived from the original (PDF) on 2023-01-04.
- Maps, Volume IV (1979). "Maps, Volume IV" (PDF). The Art and Architecture of the Crusader States. Archived from the original (PDF) on 2023-01-04.
- Maps, Volume V (1985). "Maps, Volume V" (PDF). The Impact of the Crusades on the Near East. Archived from the original (PDF) on 2023-01-04.
- Maps, Volume VI (1989). "Maps, Volume VI" (PDF). Impact of the Crusades on Europe. Archived from the original (PDF) on 2023-01-04.
- Plates, Volume IV (1979). "Plates, Volume IV" (PDF). The Art and Architecture of the Crusader States. Archived from the original (PDF) on 2023-01-04.
- Timeline, Volume I (1969a). "Important Dates and Events, Volume I" (PDF). The First Hundred Years. pp. 622–625. Archived from the original (PDF) on 2023-01-04.
- Timeline, Volume II (1969b). "Important Dates and Events, Volume II" (PDF). The Later Crusades, 1189–1311. Archived from the original (PDF) on 2023-01-04.
- Timeline, Volume III (1975). "Important Dates and Events, Volume III" (PDF). The Fourteenth and Fifteenth Centuries. pp. 667–676. Archived from the original (PDF) on 2023-01-04.
