= Melisende Psalter =

Medieval illuminated manuscript

- British Library, London
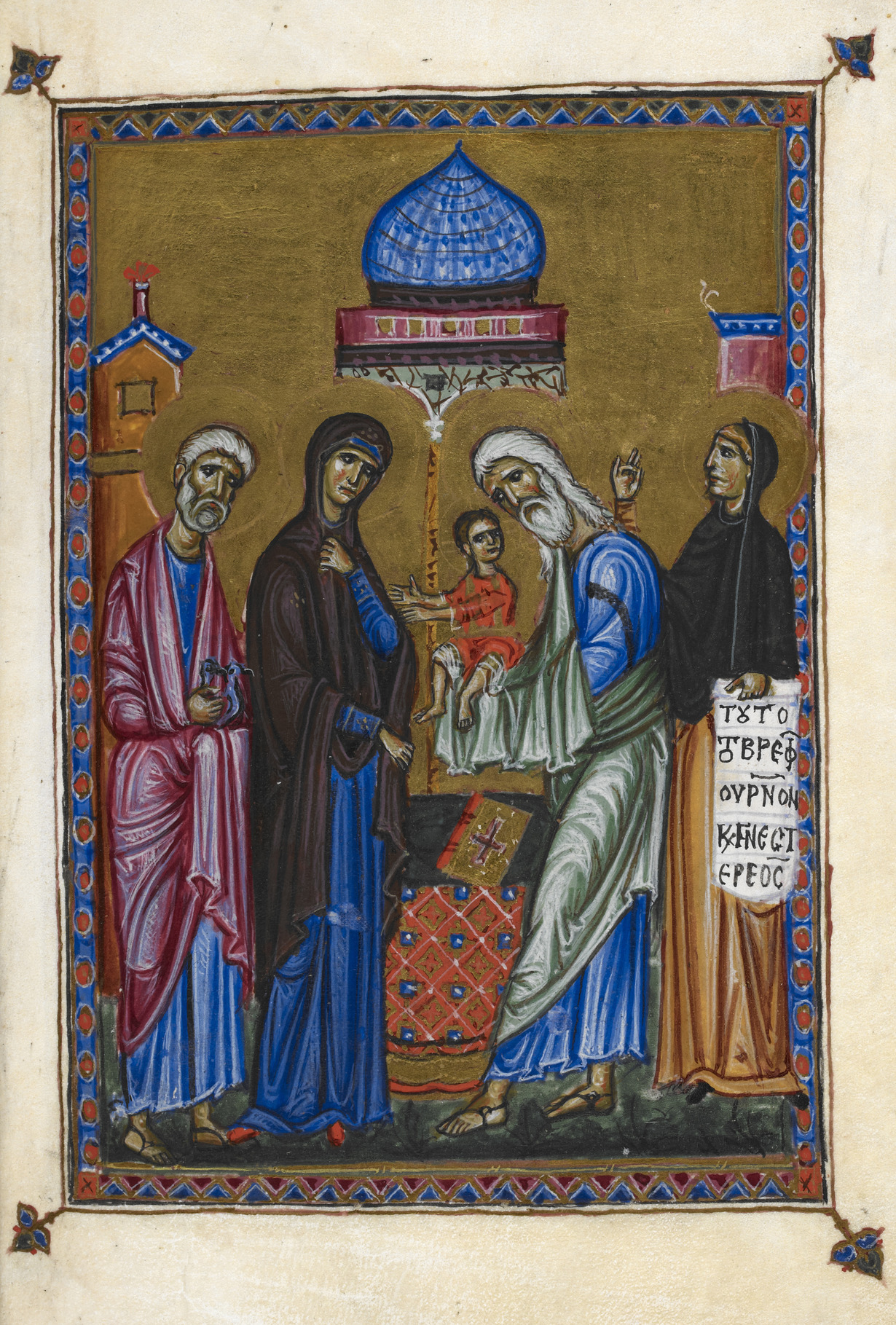
- Presentation of Christ from the Melisende Psalter
- Type: Illuminated manuscript
- Date: c. 1131–1143
- Place of origin: Kingdom of Jerusalem (Church of the Holy Sepulchre)
- Language: Latin
- Scribe: Multiple scribes (at least seven)
- Author: Biblical text (Book of Psalms)
- Compiled by: Unrecorded
- Illuminated by: Basilius (New Testament cycle); additional unnamed illuminators
- Patron: Probably King Fulk of Jerusalem
- Dedicated to: Likely Queen Melisende of Jerusalem
- Material: Parchment; ivory (covers); gold and pigments
- Size: 21.6 × 14 cm
- Format: Codex
- Condition: Largely complete; well preserved with original covers
- Script: Northern French script
- Contents: New Testament cycle; Calendar; Psalms; Prayers to saints
- Illumination(s): Fusion of Byzantine, Romanesque, Armenian, Islamic, and Western European styles
- Additions: Calendar with crusader-specific dates; zodiac medallions
- Exemplar(s): Byzantine iconography and Western psalter traditions
- Previously kept: Possibly Grande Chartreuse, Grenoble
- Accession: Egerton MS 1139
- Other: Original ivory covers with turquoise beads; artist signature "Basilius me fecit"

The Melisende Psalter (London, British Library, Egerton MS 1139) is an illuminated manuscript commissioned around 1135 in the crusader Kingdom of Jerusalem, probably by King Fulk for his wife Queen Melisende. It is a notable example of Crusader art, which resulted from a merging of the artistic styles of Roman Catholic Europe, the Eastern Orthodox Byzantine Empire and the art of the Armenian illuminated manuscript.

Seven scribes and illuminators, working in the scriptorium built by the crusaders in the Church of the Holy Sepulchre in Jerusalem, were involved in the creation of the psalter. It measures 21.6 centimetres by 14 centimetres.

This manuscript forms part of the Egerton Collection in the British Library in London.

== The New Testament cycle ==
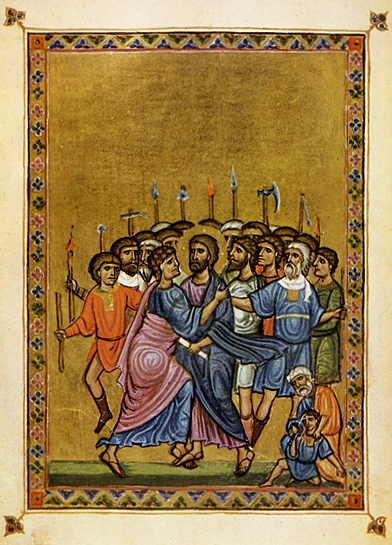
The Arrest of Christ

The first twenty-four illustrations, on each side of the first twelve folios, depict scenes from the New Testament. New Testament images were commonly found at the beginning of western psalters, unlike in eastern psalters. In this case, the images depict scenes more common in the Eastern Orthodox liturgy.

The scenes depicted are the Annunciation, Visitation, the Nativity, the Adoration of the Magi, the Presentation of Jesus at the Temple, the Baptism of Jesus, the Temptation of Christ, the Transfiguration, the Raising of Lazarus, the triumphal entry into Jerusalem (see illustration), the Last Supper, the Washing of the Feet, the Agony in the Garden, the Betrayal of Judas, the Crucifixion of Jesus, the Descent from the Cross, the Lamentation, the Harrowing of Hell, the Three Marys at the Tomb, and the Deesis.

These illustrations were made by an illuminator named Basilius, who signed the last illustration (pictured above) Basilius me fecit (Latin for "Basilius made me"), and is the only named illuminator or scribe of this manuscript. Nothing is known about Basilius. Because of his Greek name it has been suggested that he was a Byzantine artist. It is also possible that he was a western artist who had been trained in a Greek style, maybe in Constantinople. Or, he may have been an Armenian Catholic, familiar with both Catholic and Orthodox traditions.

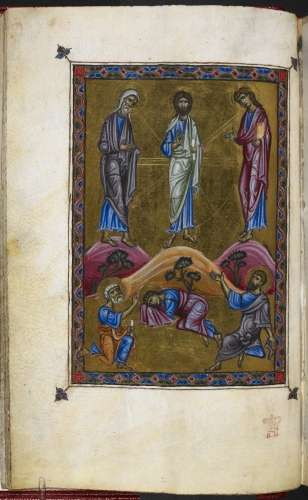
f4v, Transfiguration of Christ

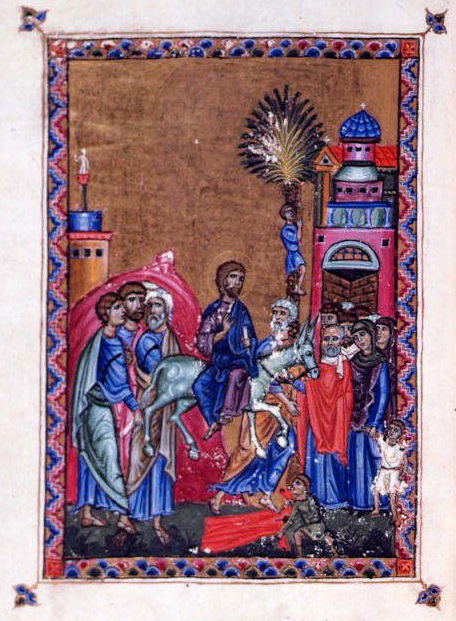
Christ's entry into Jerusalem

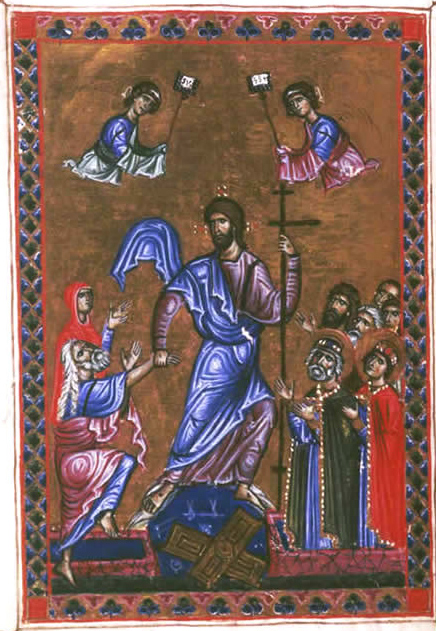
Folio 9v - The Harrowing of Hell

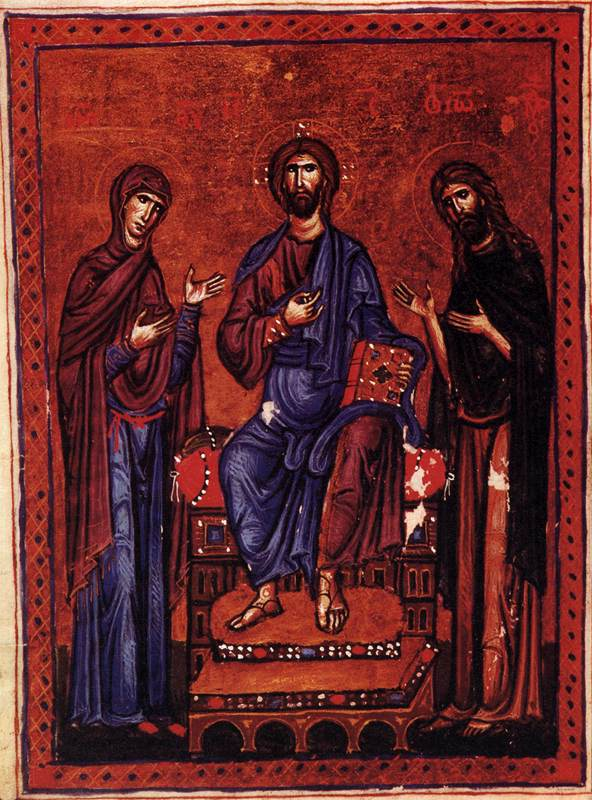
The Deesis illumination, folio 12 verso

== The calendar ==
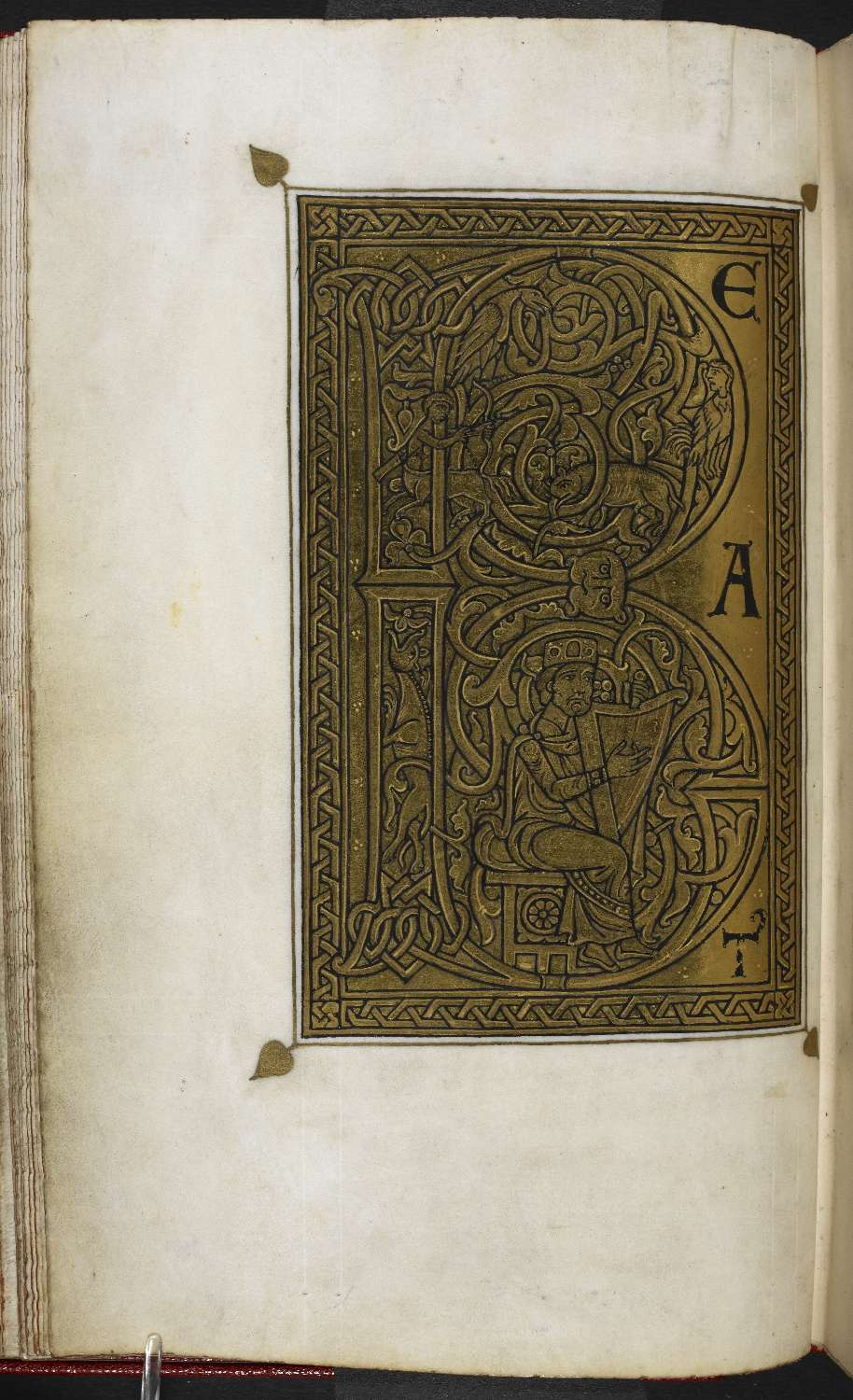
Gold and black incipit initial B from Beatus Vir, Psalm 1, with King David playing the harp.

Folios 13-21 contain the calendar, which is strikingly similar to psalter calendars produced in England in the same period. It appears to be based on a calendar of St. Swithun's church in Winchester. The calendar is filled with English saint days rather than those more popular in Jerusalem. One name, St. Martin of Tours, a saint popular throughout Europe, is written in gold, for unknown reasons.

Three crusader-specific dates are mentioned in the calendar: the capture of Jerusalem on July 15, the death of Baldwin II on August 21, and the death of his wife Morphia on October 1. Each month has a medallion with a sign of the Zodiac, illustrated in a Romanesque style with heavy Islamic influences.

== The psalter ==
Folios 22-196 contain the Latin psalms written in a northern French script. A third illuminator painted the initial letters of each psalm. Some initials take up the entire side of a leaf, and are drawn with gold lettering on a purple background. They show influence from Italian and Islamic art, possibly suggesting that the artist was trained in Muslim-influenced southern Italy.

== Prayers to the saints ==
The scribe who wrote the psalms also wrote a series of prayers on folios 197–211, dedicated to nine saints: the Virgin Mary, St. Michael, St. John the Baptist, St. Peter, St. John the Evangelist, St. Stephen, St. Nicholas, St. Mary Magdalene, and St. Agnes. The prayers are accompanied by paintings of the saints by a fourth illuminator trained in a Romanesque style. His technique also shows an attempt to incorporate a Byzantine style. There are a few blank and undecorated spaces in this section of the psalter, and it may be incomplete.

== The covers ==
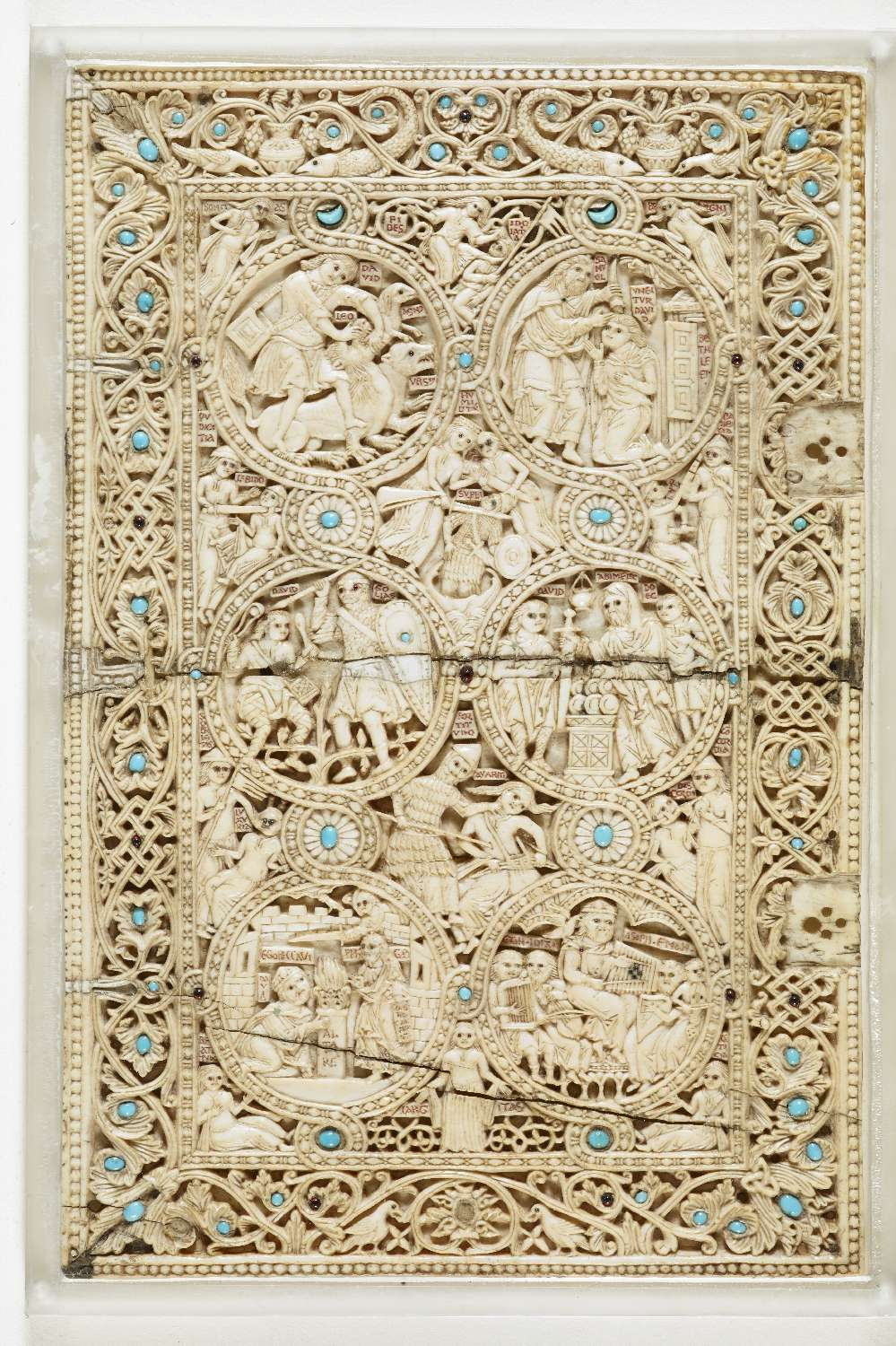
The ivory front bookcover

The ivory covers, decorated with some small turquoise beads, show scenes from the life of King David and from the Psychomachia of Prudentius on the front side, and another king performing the six works of mercy from the Gospel of Matthew on the back side, both showing influence from Byzantine, Islamic, and western art. The geometric designs on the covers are especially influenced by Islamic art.

The king on the back side is dressed in Byzantine imperial clothes, but most likely represents a crusader king, perhaps Fulk. There is a carving of a falcon above him, which is possibly a clue that the king is Fulk, as "falcon" and "Fulk" in Old French were both Fouque. Another bird name, fulica, was possibly also implied here as a pun on the king's name. Underneath the falcon, the word herodius is carved, Latin for gyrfalcon. The artist has not signed in the same way Basilius has.

The spine of the psalter is decorated with Byzantine silk and silver thread, as well as red, blue, and green Greek crosses, which are found in the royal arms of the kingdom. The spine was stitched by an artisan who was perhaps a westerner trained in a Byzantine style, as his stitching is not as smooth as other examples of Byzantine silk spines made by native Greeks.

== Date and recipient ==
The exact date of the psalter, and for whom it was made, is unknown, although it is obviously made for a noblewoman of the kingdom, based on the use of Byzantine styles, considered to be aristocratic by the crusaders, the depictions of kings, and the use of feminine word endings in the Latin prayers. Through circumstantial evidence, Queen Melisende can probably be identified as the recipient. The English influence in the calendar and elsewhere likely comes from King Fulk, who was related to the English royal family by marriage.

It is also notable that aside from the capture of Jerusalem, the only crusader-specific dates in the calendar are the deaths of Melisende's parents, King Baldwin II and Queen Morphia. The mixture of Catholic and Orthodox elements in the psalter may reflect Melisende's mixed upbringing. Her father, Baldwin, was Catholic and her mother, Morphia, was an Armenian of the Greek Orthodox faith.

If Melisende was the recipient, then the psalter was most likely commissioned by Fulk, probably around 1135. Prior to this, Fulk and Melisende had been fighting for superiority in the kingdom, and Melisende had allied with rebels against Fulk. By 1134 they had reconciled, and the psalter had to have been written after 1131, the date of Baldwin II's death. On the other hand, it could have been written anytime before Melisende's death in 1161. Palaeographical comparisons to other texts produced in Jerusalem suggest it was written in the 1140s or even 50s, but the later texts may have used the Melisende Psalter as a source.

The manuscript was perhaps owned by Grande Chartreuse, Grenoble, in the early 19th century. By about 1840 it was owned by Ambroise Comarmond, director of the Museum of Fine Arts of Lyon. Its next owner was Guglielmo Libri (b. 1802, d. 1869), who is infamous for stealing medieval manuscripts from French public libraries. He sold it to the London bookdealers Payne and Foss, who sold to the British Museum in November 1845.

== In popular culture ==
In the historical grand strategy simulation game, Crusader Kings III, the Melisende Psalter is an object the ruler can collect if their spouse or lover is cheating on them, as a reference to Fulk's attempt to win back Melisende's favor with the gift during her affair with Hugh II of Jaffa. It is called 'The Psalter of Cuckoldry', with a description of the detailing of the ivory front and its turquoise beads to define the object as the Melisende Psalter.

== Sources ==
- Janet Backhouse, "The Case of Queen Melisende's Psalter: An Historical Investigation."" In Tributes to Jonathan J. G. Alexander: The Making and Meaning of Illuminated Medieval and Renaissance Manuscripts, Art and Architecture, edited by Susan L'Engle and Gerald B. Guest, pp. 457-70. London: Harvey Miller, 2006.
- Hugo Buchthal, Miniature Painting in the Latin Kingdom of Jerusalem. Clarendon Press, 1957.
- Jaroslav Folda. "Melisende of Jerusalem: Queen and Patron of Art and Architecture in the Crusader Kingdom." In Reassessing the Roles of Women as Makers of Medieval Art and Architecture, edited by Therese Martin, pp. 429–477. Leiden; Boston: Brill, 2012.
- Jaroslav Folda, The Art of the Crusaders in the Holy Land, 1098-1187. Cambridge University Press, 1995.
- Bianca Kühnel, Crusader Art of the Twelfth Century - A Geographical, an Historical, or an Art Historical Notion? Berlin, 1994.
- Bernard Hamilton, "Women in the Crusader States: The Queens of Jerusalem (1100-1190)." In Medieval Women: Dedicated and Presented to Rosalind M. T. Hill on the Occasion of Her Seventieth Birthday, edited by Derek Baker, pp. 143–74 (Studies in Church History, Subsidia 1: Oxford, 1978).
- Jonathan Riley-Smith, The Oxford History of the Crusades. Oxford University Press, 2002.
- Barbara Zeitler, "The Distorting Mirror: Reflections on the Queen Melisende Psalter," in Through the Looking Glass: Byzantium Through British Eyes. Papers From the Twenty-Ninth Spring Syposium of Byzantine Studies, London, March 1995, eds. Robin Cormack and Elizabeth Jeffreys. Variorum, 2000.
