= Herman de Valenciennes =

French poet

Herman de Valenciennes, 12th-century French poet, was born at Valenciennes.

== Life ==
His father and mother, Robert and Herembourg, belonged to Hainaut, and gave him for god-parents Count Baldwin and Countess Yoland—doubtless Baldwin IV of Hainault and his mother Yoland.

Herman was a priest and the author of a verse Histoire de la Bible, which includes a separate poem on the Assumption of the Virgin. The work is generally known as Le Roman de sapience, the name arising from a copyist's error in the first line of the poem: "Comens de sapiense, ce est la cremors de Deu" the first word being miswritten in one manuscript Romens, and in another Romanz.

His work has, indeed, the form of an ordinary romance, and cannot be regarded as a translation. He selects such stories from the Bible as suit his purpose, and adds freely from legendary sources, displaying considerable art in the selection and use of his materials. This scriptural poem, very popular in its day, mentions Henry II of England as already dead, and must therefore be assigned to a date posterior to 1189.

See Notices et extraits des manuscrits (Paris, vol. 34), and Jean Bonnard, Les Traductions de la Bible en vers français au moyen âge (1884).

== Bibliography ==
- Spiele, Ina: Li Romanz de Dieu et sa Mere d'Herman de Valenciennes, Leyde (Presse universitaire) 1975.
