= Hugo Buchthal =

German-Jewish art historian

Hugo Buchthal (August 11, 1909 – November 10, 1996) was a German-Jewish art historian, best known for his standard work Miniature Painting in the Latin Kingdom of Jerusalem (1957).

He studied at the Warburg Institute in Germany, emigrating in 1934 when it moved to London. From 1965 he held positions in the USA.
