= Jaroslav Folda =

American art historian

Jaroslav Thayer Folda III (born 25 July 1940) is an American medievalist, in which field he is a Haskins Medal winner; he is a scholar in the history of the art of the Crusades and the N. Ferebee Taylor Professor of the History of Art at the University of North Carolina. His area of interest for teaching and research is the art of the Middle Ages in Europe and the Mediterranean world.

Folda's approach is art in historical context in which the work of art is examined in terms of form and function, meaning and content, along with what we can know about the patron, the artist, the workshop process by which it was produced, and the audience for whom it was intended. Folda's current research studies the issue of golden highlighting (chrysography), with regard to its origins, development, and distinctive characteristics in Byzantine and Crusader icon painting and Italian panel painting, mainly in the 13th century.

== Family ==
Son of Jaroslav Thayer Folda Jr and Rosalie née Gilbert. He is married to Linda Whitham with whom he has two daughters.

== Education ==
- A.B. Princeton University, 1962.
- Ph.D. The Johns Hopkins University, 1968.
- N. Ferebee Taylor Professor of the History of Art, University of North Carolina, 1996 - .

== Research and teaching interests ==
- Meaning and content in medieval art from c. 300 to c. 1500, with emphasis on works of art in their historical context
- Medieval figural art with special emphasis on manuscript illumination, icons, panel painting, metalwork, and sculpture
- Artistic interchange and cultural interpenetration in the medieval Mediterranean world
- The art and history of the crusaders in the Holy Land, 1095–1291
- Methodology for the study of medieval art

== Works ==
- Crusader Manuscript Illumination at Saint-Jean d'Acre: 1275–1291 (Princeton, 1976).
- (contributor, pp. 251–288, and assisting editor) K.M. Setton, ed., A History of the Crusades, vol. IV, H.W. Hazard, ed., The Art and Architecture of the Crusader States (Madison, 1977).
- (editor) Crusader Art in the Twelfth Century, British Archeological Reports, International Series, vol. 152 (Oxford, 1982).
- (chairman, editorial committee) Hugo Buchthal, Art of the Mediterranean World: A.D. 100 to 1400 (Washington, D.C., 1982).
- The Nazareth Capitals and the Crusader Shrine of the Annunciation, College Art Association Monograph Series, vol. XLII (University Park and London, 1986).
- The Art of the Crusaders in the Holy Land: 1098–1187, Cambridge, New York and Melbourne: Cambridge University Press, 1995.
- Crusader Art in the Holy Land: from the Third Crusade to the Fall of Acre, 1187–1291, Cambridge University Press, 2005.
- Crusader Art: The Art of the Crusaders in the Holy Land, 1099–1291, Aldershot and Burlington: Lund Humphries, 2008.

Exhibition catalogues (selected contributions)

- The Crusader Period and the Church of Saint Anne at Sepphoris, in Sepphoris in Galilee: Crosscurrents of Culture, Rebecca M. Nagy, et al., eds., North Carolina Museum of Art, Raleigh, 1996, pp. 101–107.
- Crusader Art, in: The Glory of Byzantium: Art and Culture of the Middle Byzantine Era, A.D. 843-1261, H.C. Evans and W.D. Wixom, eds., The Metropolitan Museum of Art, New York, 1997, pp. 388–391 (essay), and entries, nos. 258–262.
- Les Manuscrits enluminés dans les états de la Terre Sainte, Les Croisades, L'Orient et l'Occident d'Urbain II à Saint Louis: 1096–1270, M. Rey-Delqué, ed., Milan and Toulouse: Electa, 1997, pp. 299–305 (published in both a French and an Italian edition).
- L'Arte dei Crociati e il Pellegrinaggio nei Luoghi Santi, in: Terrasanta, Dalla Crociata ala Custodia dei Luoghi Santi, ed. M. Piccirillo, OFM, Milan, Palazzo Reale: Skira Artifice, 2000, pp. 35–43 (essay), and entries on pp. 102, 106, 241, 248, 249.
- Entries on eight crusader icons (nos. 214, 216, 223, 229- 232, 235), in: Byzantium: Faith and Power, Byzantine Art 1261-1557, ed. Helen C. Evans, New York: Metropolitan Museum of Art/New Haven and London: Yale University Press, (2004): pp. 355–356, 357–358, 365–366, 374, 374–375, 376, 377, 379–381.
- 2 essays (What is Crusader Art? and Scriptoria and Workshops, Scribes and Painters in Crusader Syria/Palestine in the 13th Century), an introduction and 5 catalogue entries (on crusader manuscripts: London, BL, Egerton MS 1139, Paris, BNF, MS fr. 2628, Dijon, Bibl. Mun., MS 562, Brussels, Bibl. Roy., MS 10175, and Perugia, Bibl. Capit. MS 6) for the Mannheim exhibition catalogue: Saladin und die Kreuzfahrer, eds. A. Wieczorek, et al., Mannheim and Mainz, 2005, pp. 176–189, 204-215 (essays) and pp. 393–394, 404-407 (introduction and entries).
