= Cultural depictions of Robert Devereux, 2nd Earl of Essex =

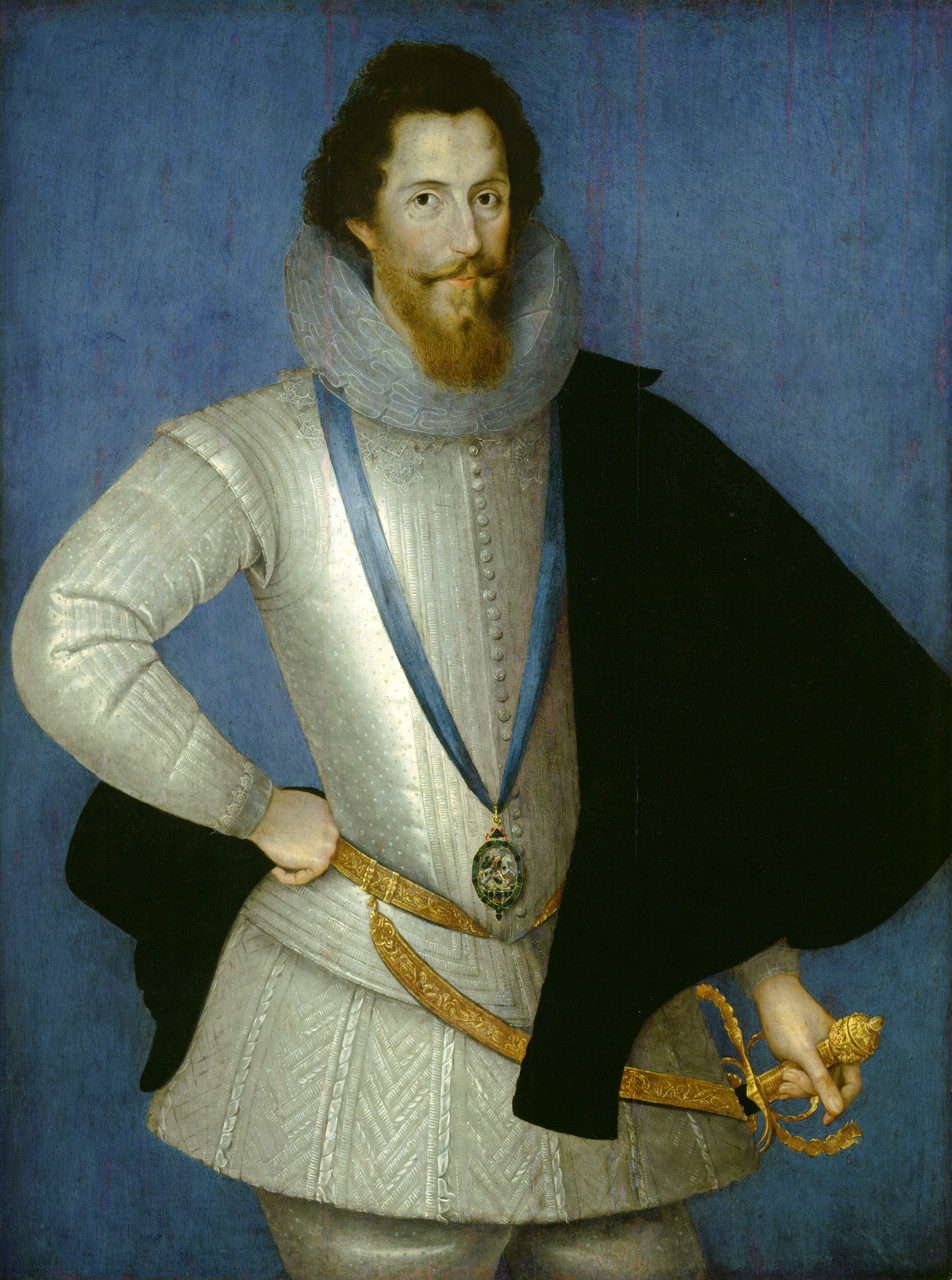
Contemporary portrait of Robert Devereux, 2nd Earl of Essex, from the studio of Marcus Gheeraerts the Younger

Robert Devereux, 2nd Earl of Essex and his close relationship with Queen Elizabeth I has inspired artistic and cultural works for over four centuries. The following lists cover various media, works of high art, and recent representations in popular culture, film and fiction.

== Literature ==
Lytton Strachey's 1928 book Elizabeth and Essex: A Tragic History chronicled the relationship between Essex and the queen.

At least two fencing treatises are dedicated to Robert, Earl of Essex. They are as follows:

- Vincentio Saviolo – His Practice (1595)
- George Silver – Paradoxes of Defence (1599)

Robert Devereux's death and confession became the subject of two popular 17th-century broadside ballads, set to the English folk tunes Essex Last Goodnight and Welladay. Numerous ballads lamenting his death and praising his military feats were also published throughout the 17th century.

== Stage ==
Essex features as a character in the following stage productions.

- In the 1956 essay Hamlet oder Hekuba: der Einbruch der Zeit in das Spiel (Hamlet or Hecuba: the Irruption of Time into the Play), the German legal theorist Carl Schmitt suggests that elements of the Essex's biography, in particular his final days and last words, were incorporated into William Shakespeare's Hamlet at both the level of dialogue and the level of characterisation. Schmitt's overall argument investigates the relationship between history and narrative generally.
- Essex is referenced in William Shakespeare's play Henry V, which was written around the time of his Irish campaign in 1599. The character Gower speaks of a soldier who wears "a beard of the General's cut"; Essex had a distinctive square-cut beard. Shakespeare also alludes to the bitter conditions English conscripts faced in Ireland, with "winter coming on and sickness growing / Upon our soldiers". In the final act, Shakespeare effectively invites Londoners to welcome Essex home from a presumably successful campaign: "Were now the General of our gracious Empress / As in good time he may, from Ireland coming / Bringing rebellion broached on his sword".
- Essex is said by editor David L. Stevenson to be alluded to in Much Ado About Nothing at 3.1.10–11.
- Gauthier de Costes, seigneur de la Calprenède, Le Comte d'Essex (1639).
- Thomas Corneille, Le Comte d'Essex (1678).
- Claude Boyer, Le Comte d'Essex, tragedie. Par Monsieur Boyer de l'Academie françoise (1678).
- John Banks, The Unhappy Favourite; Or the Earl of Essex, a Tragedy (1682).
- Jacques-François Ancelot's Elizabeth of England (1829)
- The night of Essex's execution is dramatised in the Timothy Findley play Elizabeth Rex.
- La Reine Elizabeth, a French play by Émile Moreau
- Elizabeth the Queen (1930) by Maxwell Anderson dramatises the queen's relationship with Essex, and ends with his execution.

=== Opera ===
- Il Conte d'Essex (1833) by Saverio Mercadante, with libretto by Felice Romani
- Roberto Devereux (1837) by Gaetano Donizetti, with libretto by Salvadore Cammarano based on Jacques-François Ancelot's play Elizabeth of England and Il Conte d'Essex; Giovanni Basadonna originated the role of Essex
- Gloriana (1953) by Benjamin Britten, with libretto by William Plomer, based on Strachey's Elizabeth and Essex

== Screen ==
Les Amours de la reine Élisabeth (1912), directed by Louis Mercanton and Henri Desfontaines; Lou Tellegen plays Essex.

Essex has been portrayed by various actors in film and television productions.

=== Film ===
- Lou Tellegen in Les Amours de la reine Élisabeth (1912); a French silent film, based on La Reine Elizabeth, featuring Sarah Bernhardt as Elizabeth.
- Errol Flynn in The Private Lives of Elizabeth and Essex (1939); starring Bette Davis as Elizabeth, the film is based on Anderson's play.
- Sam Reid in Anonymous (2011); a historical fiction film that posits that Edward de Vere, 17th Earl of Oxford, was the true author of William Shakespeare's plays, and that both Essex and the 3rd Earl of Southampton are Elizabeth's illegitimate sons.
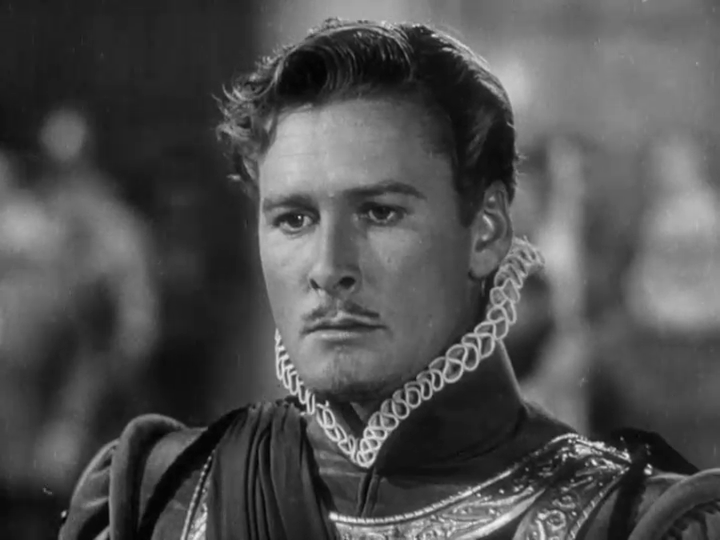
  Errol Flynn portrayed Essex in The Private Lives of Elizabeth and Essex (1939)

=== Television ===
- Charlton Heston in a 1968 television adaptation of Anderson's Elizabeth the Queen for the Hallmark Hall of Fame series; Judith Anderson portrayed Elizabeth
- Robin Ellis in the fifth and sixth episodes of the BBC series Elizabeth R (1971), starring Glenda Jackson as Elizabeth
- Hugh Dancy in Elizabeth I (2005); a 2005 Channel 4/HBO co-production starring Helen Mirren as Elizabeth
- Hans Matheson in The Virgin Queen (2005); a BBC drama series starring Anne-Marie Duff as Elizabeth
- Joe Wredden in Elizabeth I's Secret Agents (2017); a BBC documentary mini-series

== Video game ==
- Voiced by Rich Keeble in the video game Astrologaster.
