= Ancelot =

Ancelot is a surname. Notable people with the surname include:

- Jacques-François Ancelot (1794–1854), French dramatist and litterateur
- Virginie Ancelot (1792–1875), French painter, writer, and playwright
