= Louis IX of France =

King of France from 1226 to 1270

Louis IX
- Saint
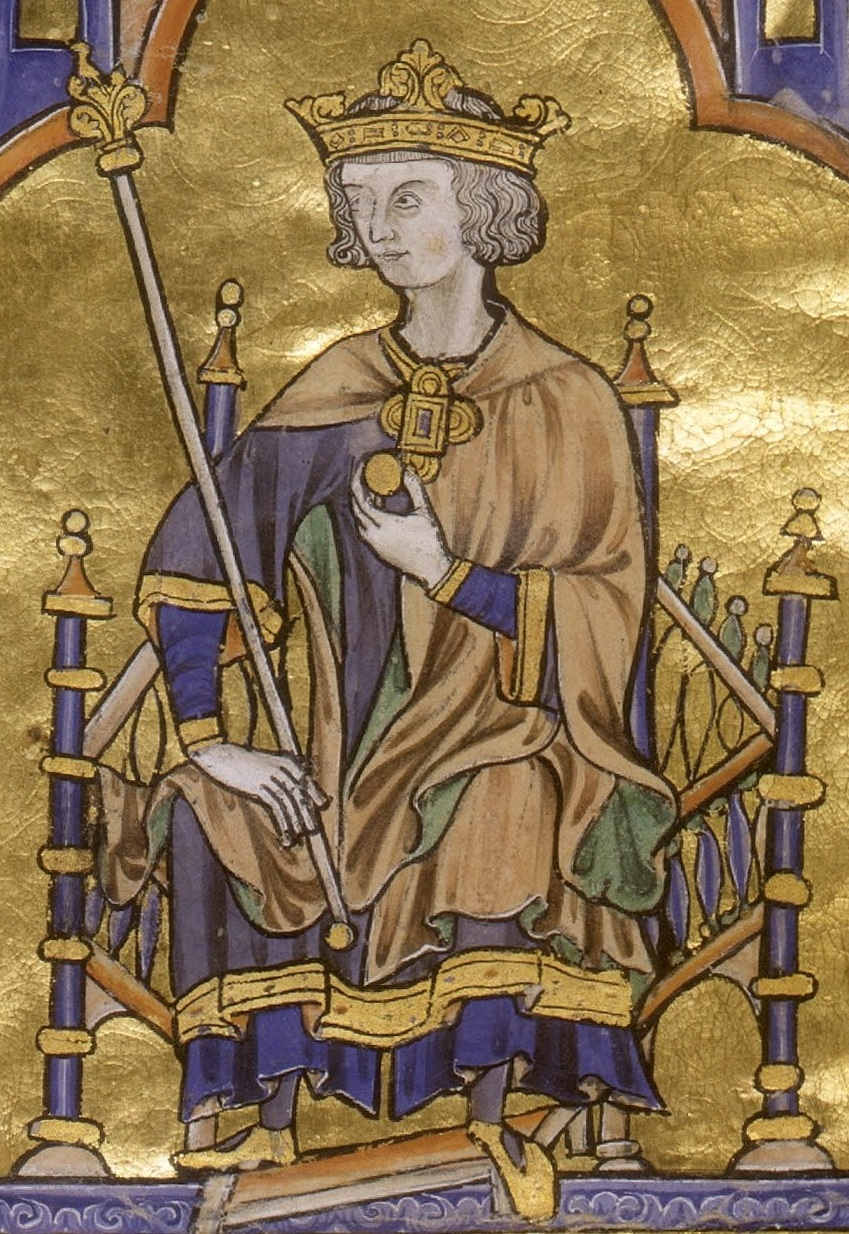
- Contemporary depiction from the Bible of St Louis, c. 1250

King of France
- Reign: 8 November 1226 – 25 August 1270
- Coronation: 29 November 1226
- Predecessor: Louis VIII
- Successor: Philip III
- Regents: See list: Blanche of Castile (1226–1234, 1248–1252); Alphonse, Count of Poitiers (1252–1254); Charles I, Count of Anjou (1252–1254); Matthew, Abbot of Saint-Denis (1270); Simon II, Lord of Clermont (1270)
- Born: 25 April 1214; Poissy, France
- Died: 25 August 1270 (aged 56); Tunis, Hafsid dynasty
- Burial: Basilica of St Denis and Monreale Cathedral
- Spouse: Margaret of Provence (m. 1234)
- Issue among others...: Isabella, Queen of Navarre; Louis of France; Philip III, King of France; John Tristan, Count of Valois; Peter I, Count of Alençon; Blanche, Infanta of Castile; Margaret, Duchess of Brabant; Robert, Count of Clermont; Agnes, Duchess of Burgundy
- House: Capet
- Father: Louis VIII of France
- Mother: Blanche of Castile
- Religion: Roman Catholicism

Louis IX (25 April 1214 – 25 August 1270), also known as Saint Louis, was King of France from 1226 until his death in 1270. He is widely recognized as the most distinguished of the Direct Capetians, is the sole king of France to be canonised as a saint of the Catholic Church, and is also the direct ancestor of all subsequent French kings. Following the death of his father, Louis VIII, he was crowned in Reims at the age of 12. His mother, Blanche of Castile, effectively ruled the kingdom as regent until he came of age, and continued to serve as his trusted adviser until her death.

During his formative years, Blanche successfully confronted rebellious vassals and championed the Capetian cause in the Albigensian Crusade, which had been ongoing for the past two decades.

As an adult, Louis IX grappled with persistent conflicts involving some of the most influential nobles in his kingdom, including Hugh X of Lusignan and Peter I of Brittany. Concurrently, England's Henry III sought to reclaim the Angevin continental holdings, only to be decisively defeated at the Battle of Taillebourg. Louis expanded his territory by annexing several provinces, including parts of Aquitaine, Maine, and Provence. Keeping a promise he made while praying for recovery from a grave illness, Louis led the ill-fated Seventh and Eighth Crusades against the Muslim dynasties that controlled North Africa, Egypt, and the Holy Land. He was captured by Egyptian forces and ransomed during the Seventh Crusade, and later succumbed to dysentery during the Eighth Crusade. His son, Philip III, succeeded him.

Louis instigated significant reforms in the French legal system, creating a royal justice mechanism that allowed petitioners to appeal judgments directly to the monarch. He abolished trials by ordeal, endeavored to terminate private wars, and incorporated the presumption of innocence into criminal proceedings. To implement his new legal framework, he established the offices of provosts and bailiffs. Louis IX's reign is often marked as an economic and political zenith for medieval France, and he held immense respect throughout Christendom. His reputation as a fair and judicious ruler led to his being solicited to mediate disputes beyond his own kingdom. Louis IX expanded upon the work of his predecessors, especially his grandfather Philip II of France, and reformed the administrative institutions of the French crown. He re-introduced, and expanded the scope of, the enquêtes commissioned to investigate governmental abuses and provide monetary restitutions for the crown.

Louis's admirers through the centuries have celebrated him as the quintessential Christian monarch. His skill as a knight and engaging manner with the public contributed to his popularity. Saint Louis was extremely pious, earning the moniker of a "monk king". Louis was a staunch Christian and rigorously enforced Catholic orthodoxy. He enacted harsh laws against blasphemy, and he also launched actions against France's Jewish population, including ordering them to wear a yellow badge of shame, as well as the notorious burning of the Talmud following the Disputation of Paris.

== Sources ==
Much of what is known of Louis's life comes from Jean de Joinville's famous Life of Saint Louis. Joinville was a close friend, confidant, and counselor to the king. He participated as a witness in the papal inquest into Louis's life that resulted in his canonization in 1297 by Pope Boniface VIII. Two other important biographies were written by the king's confessor, Geoffrey of Beaulieu, and his chaplain, William of Chartres. While several individuals wrote biographies in the decades following the king's death, only Jean of Joinville, Geoffrey of Beaulieu, and William of Chartres wrote from personal knowledge of the king and of the events they describe, and all three are biased favorably to the king. The fourth important source of information is William of Saint-Parthus's 19th-century biography, which he wrote using material from the papal inquest mentioned above.

== Early life ==
Louis was born on 25 April 1214 at Poissy, near Paris, the son of then-Prince Louis "the Lion" (later Louis VIII of France) and Blanche of Castile, during the reign of his paternal grandfather, Philip II "Augustus" of France, and was baptized in Poissy in La Collégiale Notre-Dame church. His maternal grandfather was King Alfonso VIII of Castile. Tutors of Blanche's choosing taught him Latin, public speaking, writing, military arts, and government. His father succeeded to the throne upon Philip II's death in 1223, when then-Prince Louis was nine years old.

== Minority (1226–1234) ==
Louis was 12 years old when his father died on 8 November 1226. His coronation as king took place on 29 November 1226 at Reims Cathedral, officiated by the bishop of Soissons. Louis's mother, Queen Blanche, ruled France as regent during his minority. Louis's mother instilled in him her devout Christianity. She is once recorded to have said:

I love you, my dear son, as much as a mother can love her child; but I would rather see you dead at my feet than that you should ever commit a mortal sin.

Louis's younger brother Charles I of Sicily (1227–85) was created count of Anjou, thus founding the Capetian Angevin dynasty.

In 1229, when Louis was 15, his mother ended the Albigensian Crusade by signing an agreement with Raymond VII of Toulouse. Raymond VI of Toulouse had been suspected of ordering the assassination of Pierre de Castelnau, a Catholic preacher who attempted to convert the Cathars.

On 27 May 1234, Louis married Margaret of Provence (1221–1295); she was crowned queen in Sens Cathedral the next day. Margaret was the sister of Eleanor of Provence, who later married Henry III of England. The new Queen Margaret's religious zeal made her a well-suited partner for the king, and they are attested to have got on well, enjoying riding together, reading, and listening to music. His closeness to Margaret aroused jealousy in his mother, who tried to keep the couple apart as much as she could.

While his contemporaries viewed Louis's reign as co-rule between him and his mother, historians generally believe Louis began ruling personally in 1234, with his mother then assuming a more advisory role. She continued to have a strong influence on the king until her death in 1252.

== Louis as king ==
=== Arts ===
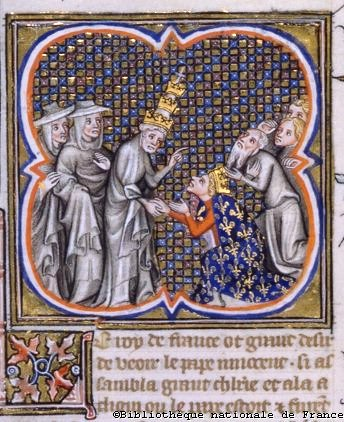
Pope Innocent IV with Louis IX at Cluny

Louis's patronage of the arts inspired much innovation in Gothic art and architecture. The style of his court was influential throughout Europe, both because of artwork purchased from Parisian masters for export, and by the marriage of the king's daughters and other female relatives to foreigners. They became emissaries of Parisian models and styles elsewhere. Louis's personal chapel, the Sainte-Chapelle in Paris, which was known for its intricate stained-glass windows, was copied more than once by his descendants elsewhere. Louis is believed to have ordered the production of the Morgan Bible and the Arsenal Bible, both deluxe illuminated manuscripts.

During the golden century of Saint Louis, the kingdom of France was at its height in Europe, both politically and economically. Saint Louis was regarded as "primus inter pares", first among equals, among the kings and rulers of the continent. He commanded the largest army and ruled the largest and wealthiest kingdom, the European centre of arts and intellectual thought at the time. The foundations for the notable college of theology, later known as the Sorbonne, were laid in Paris about the year 1257.

=== Arbitration ===
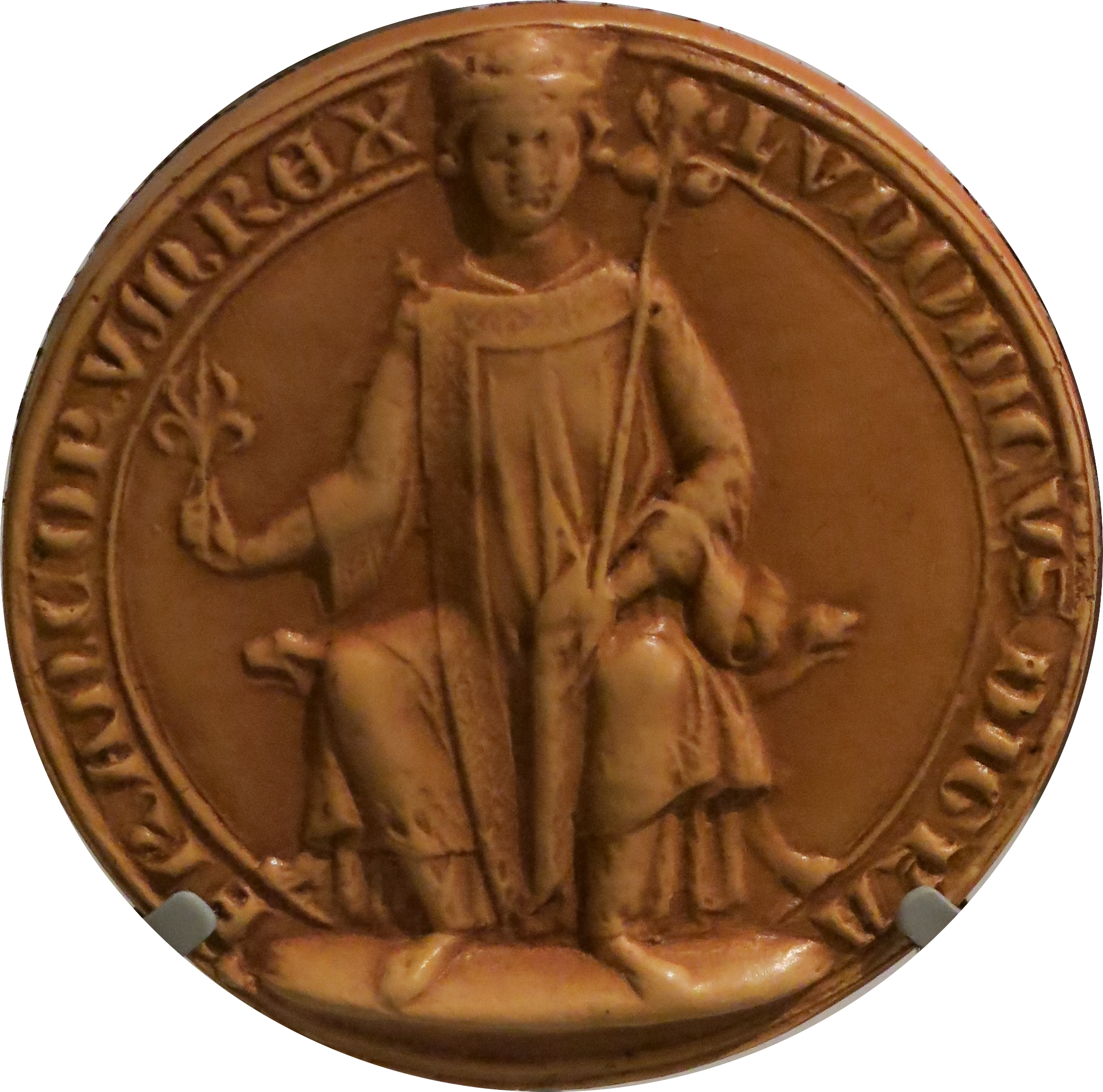
Seal of Louis IX, legend: lvdovicvs di gra(tia) francorvm rex ("Louis, by the grace of God, king of the Franks")

The prestige and respect felt by Europeans for King Louis IX were due more to the appeal of his personality than to military domination. For his contemporaries, he was the quintessential example of the Christian prince and embodied the whole of Christendom in his person. His reputation for fairness and even saintliness was already well established while he was alive, and on many occasions he was chosen as an arbiter in quarrels among the rulers of Europe.

Shortly before 1256, Enguerrand IV, Lord of Coucy, arrested and without trial hanged three young squires of Laon, whom he accused of poaching in his forest. In 1256 Louis had the lord arrested and brought to the Louvre by his sergeants. Enguerrand demanded judgment by his peers and trial by battle, which the king refused because he thought it obsolete. Enguerrand was tried, sentenced, and ordered to pay 12,000 livres. Part of the money was to pay for masses to be said in perpetuity for the souls of the men he had hanged.

In 1258, Louis and James I of Aragon signed the Treaty of Corbeil to end areas of contention between them. By this treaty, Louis renounced his feudal overlordship over the County of Barcelona and Roussillon, which was held by the King of Aragon. James in turn renounced his feudal overlordship over several counties in southern France, including Provence and Languedoc. In 1259 Louis signed the Treaty of Paris, by which Henry III of England was confirmed in his possession of territories in southwestern France, and Louis received the provinces of Anjou, Normandy (Normandie), Poitou, Maine, and Touraine.

=== Religion ===
The perception of Louis IX by his contemporaries as the exemplary Christian prince was reinforced by his religious zeal. Louis was an extremely devout Catholic, and he built the Sainte-Chapelle ("Holy Chapel"), located within the royal palace complex (now the Paris Hall of Justice), on the Île de la Cité in the centre of Paris. The Sainte Chapelle, a prime example of the Rayonnant style of Gothic architecture, was erected as a shrine for the crown of thorns and a fragment of the True Cross, precious relics of the Passion of Christ. He acquired these in 1239–41 from Emperor Baldwin II of the Latin Empire of Constantinople by agreeing to pay off Baldwin's debt to the Venetian merchant Niccolo Quirino, for which Baldwin had pledged the Crown of Thorns as collateral. Louis IX paid the exorbitant sum of 135,000 livres to clear the debt.

In 1230, the king forbade all forms of usury, defined at the time as any taking of interest and therefore covering most banking activities. Louis used these anti-usury laws to extract funds from Jewish and Lombard moneylenders, with the hopes that it would help pay for a future crusade. Louis also oversaw the Disputation of Paris in 1240, in which Paris's Jewish leaders were imprisoned and forced to admit to anti-Christian passages in the Talmud, the major source of Jewish commentaries on the Bible and religious law. As a result of the disputation, Pope Gregory IX declared that all copies of the Talmud should be seized and destroyed. In 1242, Louis ordered the burning of 12,000 copies of the Talmud, along with other important Jewish books and scripture. The edict against the Talmud was eventually overturned by Gregory IX's successor, Innocent IV.

Louis also expanded the scope of the Inquisition in France. He set the punishment for blasphemy to mutilation of the tongue and lips. The area most affected by this expansion was southern France, where the Cathar sect had been strongest. The rate of confiscation of property from the Cathars and others reached its highest levels in the years before his first crusade and slowed upon his return to France in 1254.

In 1250, Louis headed a crusade to Egypt and was taken prisoner. During his captivity, he recited the Divine Office every day. After his release against ransom, he visited the Holy Land before returning to France. In these deeds, Louis IX tried to fulfill what he considered the duty of France as "the eldest daughter of the Church" (la fille aînée de l'Église), a tradition of protector of the Church going back to the Franks and Charlemagne, who had been crowned by Pope Leo III in Rome in 800. The kings of France were known in the Church by the title "most Christian king" (Rex Christianissimus).

Louis founded many hospitals and houses: the House of the Filles-Dieu for reformed prostitutes; the Quinze-Vingt for 300 blind men (1254), and hospitals at Pontoise, Vernon, and Compiègne.

St. Louis installed a house of the Trinitarian Order at Fontainebleau, his chateau and estate near Paris. He chose Trinitarians as his chaplains and was accompanied by them on his crusades. In his spiritual testament he wrote, "My dearest son, you should permit yourself to be tormented by every kind of martyrdom before you would allow yourself to commit a mortal sin."

Louis authored and sent the Enseignements, or teachings, to his son Philip III. The letter outlined how Philip should follow the example of Jesus Christ in order to be a moral leader. The letter is estimated to have been written in 1267, three years before Louis's death.

=== Legal reforms ===
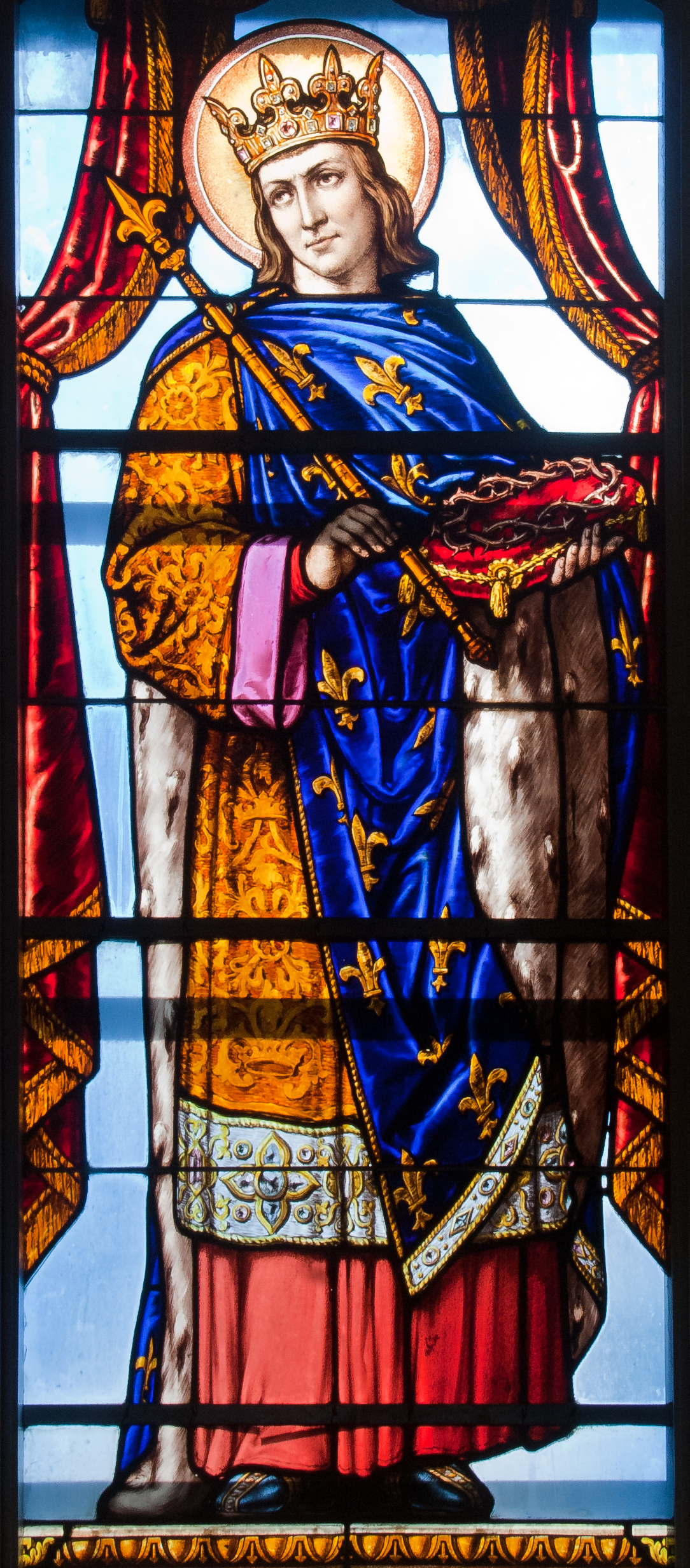
Detail of stained glass window, depicting St. Louis, created by Leopold Lobin

Louis IX's most enduring domestic achievements came through his reform of the French legal system. He created mechanisms that allowed subjects to appeal judicial decisions directly to the monarch, establishing a precedent for royal courts as the ultimate arbiters of justice in the kingdom. One of his most significant legal innovations was the abolition of trials by ordeal and combat, practices that had determined guilt or innocence through physical tests rather than evidence. Louis was the second European monarch after Frederick II, Holy Roman Emperor to outlaw trial by ordeal, and in its place, Louis introduced the concept of presumption of innocence in criminal proceedings, fundamentally altering how justice was administered throughout the kingdom. These reforms established a more rational and equitable legal framework that would influence French jurisprudence for centuries.

Prior to his departure on crusade in 1248, Louis had sent enquêteurs across the kingdom to receive complaints about royal injustice, investigate those claims, and provide restitutions to deserving petitioners. Based on the evidence of administrative corruption and malfeasance compiled in the enquêteurs' reports, as well as the disastrous failure of the crusade itself, in the last sixteen years of his reign Louis initiated a sweeping series of reforms. This reform program was highlighted by the promulgation in December 1254 of what is known as the Great Reform Ordinance, a wide-ranging set of ethical principles and practical rules concerning the conduct and moral integrity of royal officers including baillis and enquêteurs. To ensure that the ordinance's precepts were upheld and enforced, the crown simultaneously relied upon a broad array of preventive strategies, intensive supervision, and accountability procedures, chief among them the reintroduction of the "enquêtes". A 1261 inquest into the conduct of Mathieu de Beaune, bailli of Vermandois, illustrates Louis's commitment to accountability: testimonies from 247 witnesses were collected to investigate corruption allegations, showcasing the crown's rigorous oversight mechanisms and its mission to create a more transparent judiciary. Such measures reduced localized abuses of power and standardized legal proceedings across the realm.

Perhaps most emblematic of Louis's commitment to justice was his personal involvement in judicial proceedings. According to many local legends and contemporary accounts, the king frequently sat under a great oak tree in the forest of Vincennes near Paris, where he would personally hear cases and render judgements.

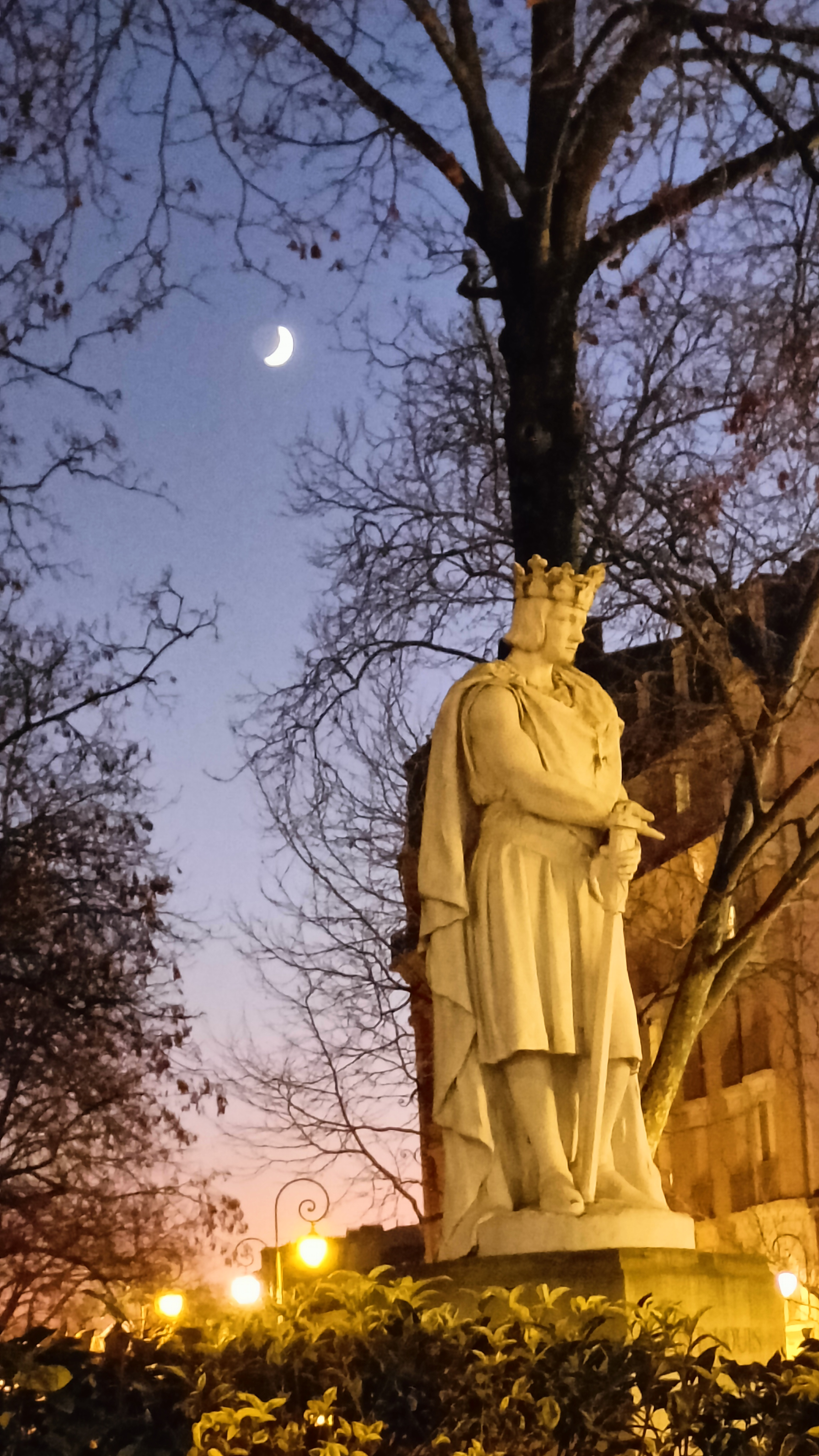
Statue of King Saint-Louis at Château de Vincennes

=== Scholarship and learning ===
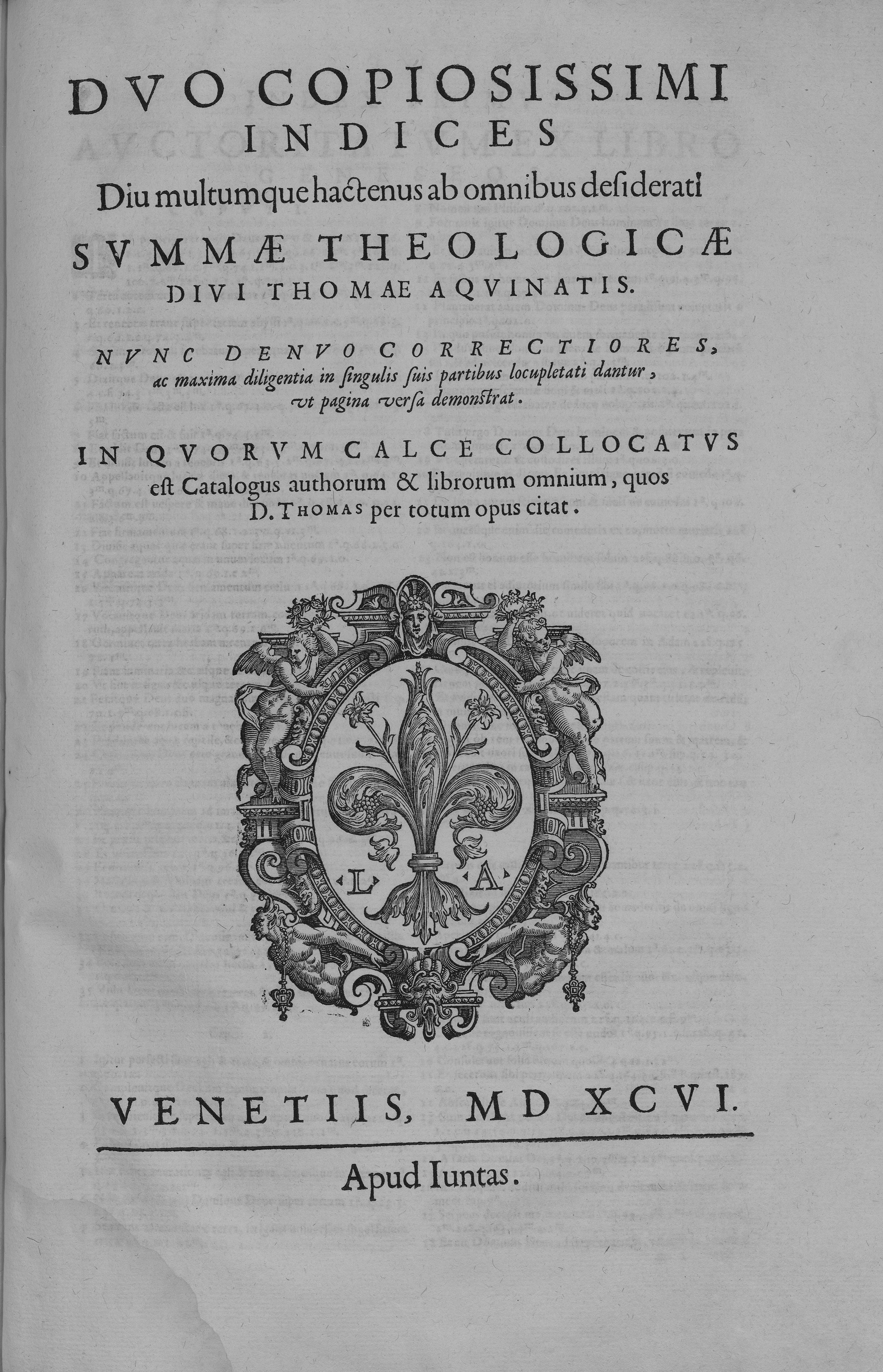
A copy of Thomas Aquinas's "Summa theologica", widely regarded as the epitome of medieval, scholastic, and Christian theology

The reign of Louis IX coincided with a remarkable intellectual flourishing in France, particularly in Paris, which emerged as Europe's pre-eminent center of learning during Louis's reign. Scholars like William of Auvergne played a crucial role in shaping the intellectual landscape of Europe during his reign. William of Auvergne's monumental Magisterium divinale (1223–1240) attempted to reconcile Aristotelian philosophy with Christian doctrine, particularly challenges posed by Arabic commentaries on Aristotle. He was greatly favored by the crown and also served as a member of the regency council that ruled France in absence of the king during the seventh crusade.

Perhaps greatest of all the intellectual minds active in France during Louis's reign was the theologian Thomas Aquinas. Aquinas's association with Paris represents one of the most fruitful collaborations between scholasticism and intellectual endeavor. Though Italian by birth, Aquinas conducted his most important work at the University of Paris, where he held the Dominican chair in theology twice (1256–1259 and 1269–1272). His Summa Theologica, widely considered to be the epitome of medieval scholastic theology, synthesized Aristotelian philosophy with Christian theology in an unprecedented systematic framework at a time when Aristotle was just regaining popularity in Europe.

Another major scholastic figure, the German Dominican Albertus Magnus, was also active at the University of Paris from 1245 to 1248. His experimental approach to natural sciences, exemplified by botanical studies and mineralogical investigations, prefigured later scientific methods while maintaining a theological framework. Louis IX's support for Dominican institutions facilitated Albertus's work, which helped transform Paris into the primary center for Aristotelian studies.

== Personal reign (1235–1266) ==
=== Construction of the Sainte-Chapelle ===
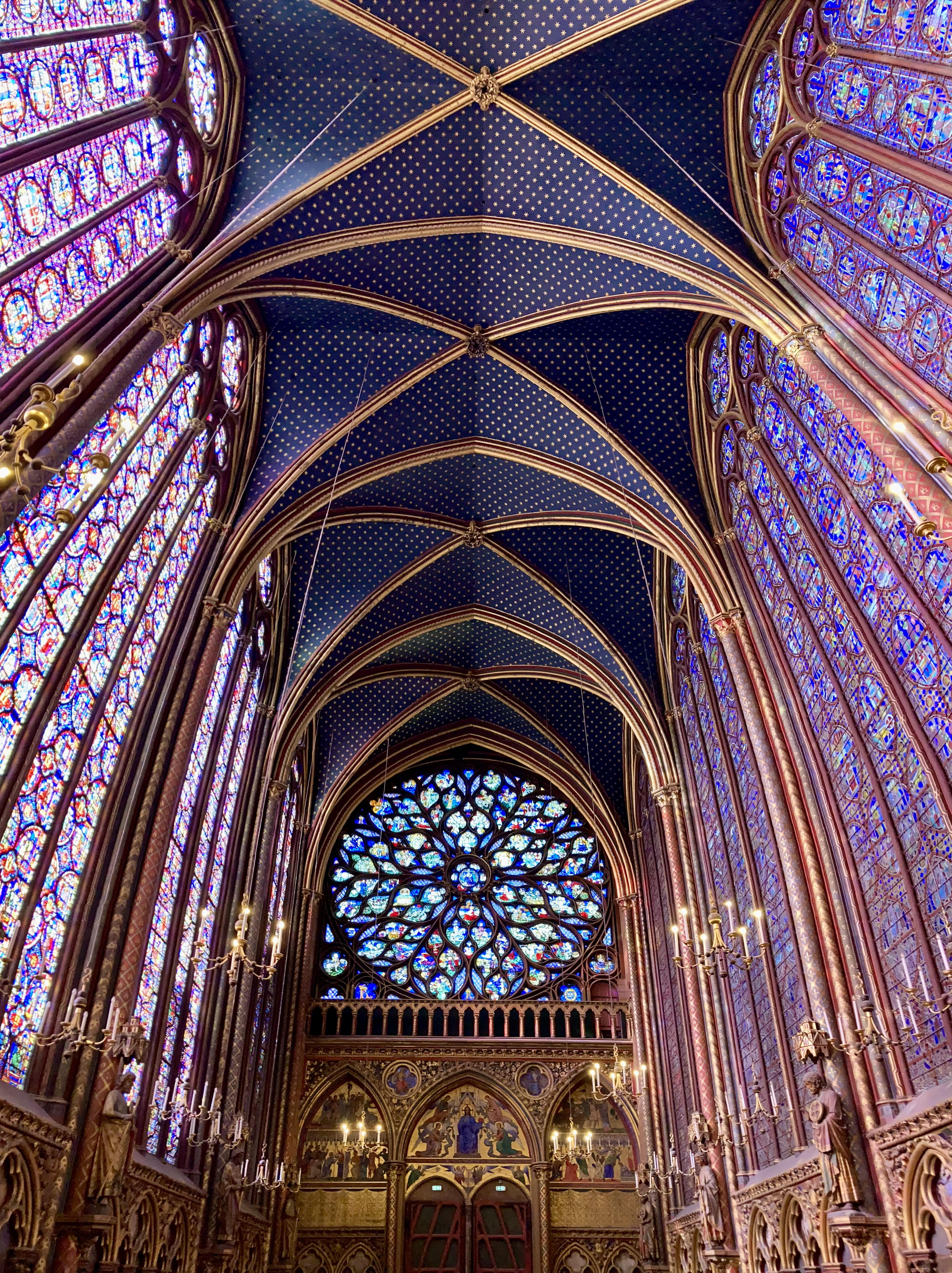
Interior of the Saint-Chapelle, Paris

The construction of Sainte-Chapelle was inspired by earlier Carolingian royal chapels, most notably the Palatine Chapel of Charlemagne at Aix-la-Chapelle (modern-day Aachen). Before embarking on this ambitious project, Louis had already built a royal chapel at the Château de Saint-Germain-en-Laye in 1238. This earlier, single-level chapel's plan would be adapted for Sainte-Chapelle, though on a much grander scale.

The primary motivation for building Sainte-Chapelle was to create a suitable sanctuary for Louis IX's collection of precious Christian relics including the crown of thorns. The foundation of the Chapelle was laid in 1241 and construction proceeded rapidly into the decade. On 26 April 1248 the Saint-Chapelle was consecrated as a private royal chapel for King Louis IX.

The completed structure was remarkable in size, measuring 36 meters (118 ft) long, 17 meters (56 ft) wide, and 42.5 meters (139 ft) high - dimensions that rivaled contemporary Gothic cathedrals. The chapel featured two distinct levels of equal size but different purposes, the upper level housed the sacred relics and was reserved exclusively for the royal family and their guests, while the lower level served courtiers, servants, and palace.

=== Seventh Crusade ===
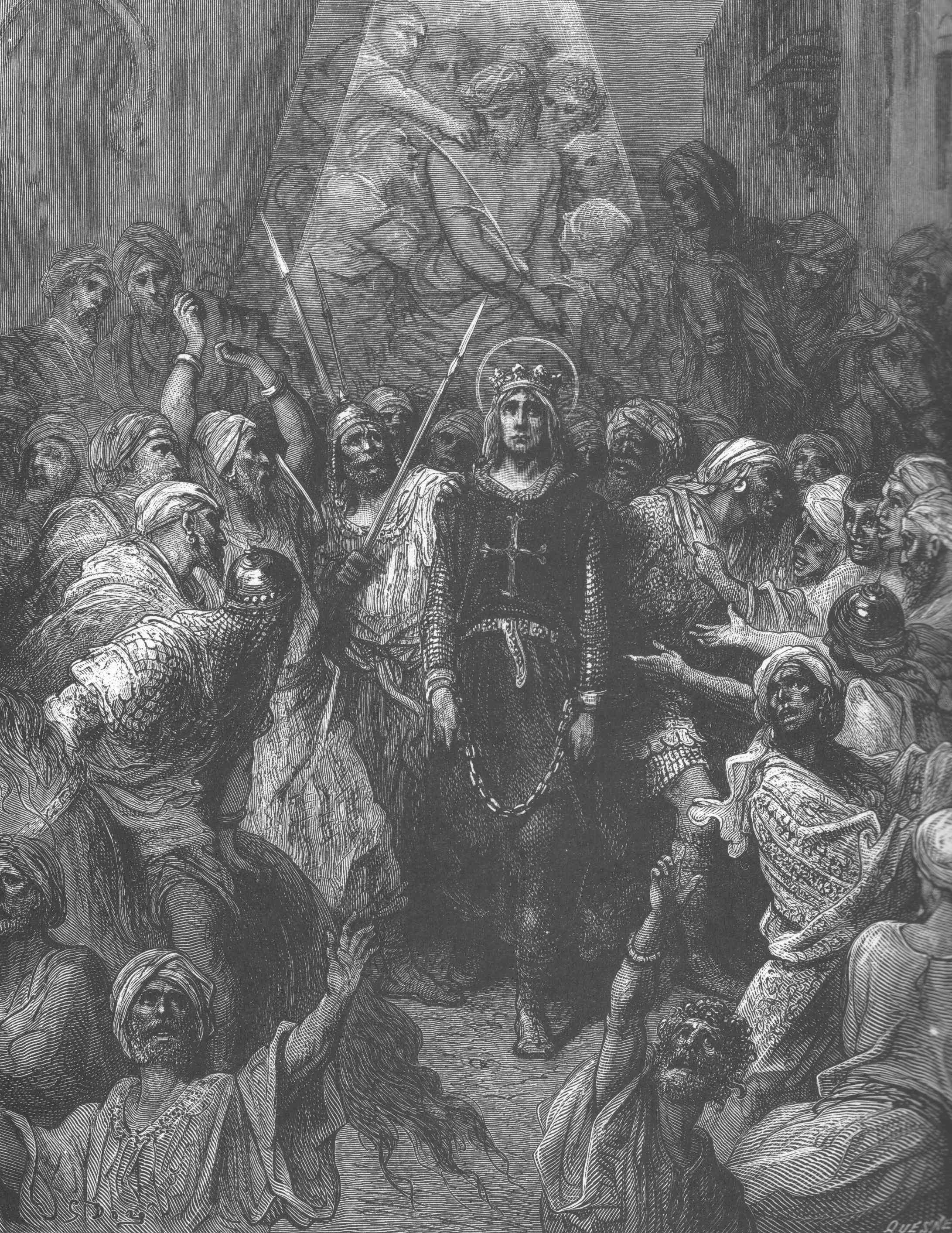
Louis IX was taken prisoner at the Battle of Fariskur, during the Seventh Crusade (Gustave Doré).

The Seventh Crusade was formally inaugurated by Pope Innocent IV's issuance of the bull Terra Sancta Christi in 1245, which called for a renewed effort to secure Jerusalem by targeting Egypt, the economic and military linchpin of the Ayyubid Sultanate. This papal directive built upon a century of crusading precedent, particularly the Fifth Crusade (1217–1221), which had similarly sought to leverage control over the Nile Delta to pressure Muslim powers in Syria and Palestine. Louis and his followers landed in Egypt on 4 or 5 June 1249 and began their campaign with the capture of the port of Damietta. This attack caused some disruption in the Muslim Ayyubid empire, especially as the current sultan, Al-Malik as-Salih Najm al-Din Ayyub, was on his deathbed. However, the march of Europeans from Damietta toward Cairo through the Nile River Delta went slowly. The seasonal rising of the Nile and the summer heat made it impossible for them to advance. During this time, the Ayyubid sultan died, and the sultan's wife Shajar al-Durr set in motion a shift in power that would make her Queen and eventually result in the rule of the Egyptian army of the Mamluks.

On 8 February 1250, Louis lost his army at the Battle of Fariskur and was captured by the Egyptians. His release was eventually negotiated in return for a ransom of 400,000 bezants or about 200,000 livres tournois, a little less than the French crown's annual income, and the surrender of the city of Damietta.

=== Four years in the Kingdom of Jerusalem ===
Upon his liberation from captivity in Egypt, Louis IX devoted four years to fortifying the Kingdom of Jerusalem, focusing his efforts in Acre, Caesarea, and Jaffa. He used his resources to aid the Crusaders in reconstructing their defenses and actively engaged in diplomatic endeavors with the Ayyubid dynasty. In the spring of 1254, Louis and his remaining forces made their return to France.

Louis maintained regular correspondence and envoy exchanges with the Mongol rulers of his era. During his first crusade in 1248, he received envoys from Eljigidei, the Mongol military leader stationed in Armenia and Persia. Eljigidei proposed that Louis should launch an offensive in Egypt while he targeted Baghdad to prevent the unification of the Muslim forces in Egypt and Syria. In response, Louis sent André de Longjumeau, a Dominican priest, as a delegate to the Khagan Güyük Khan (r. 1246–1248) in Mongolia. However, Güyük's death preceded the arrival of the emissary, and his widow and acting regent, Oghul Qaimish, rejected the diplomatic proposition.

Louis sent another representative, the Franciscan missionary and explorer William of Rubruck, to the Mongol court. Rubruck visited the Khagan Möngke (r. 1251–1259) in Mongolia and spent several years there. In 1259, Berke, the leader of the Golden Horde, demanded Louis's submission. In contrast, Mongol emperors Möngke and Khubilai's brother, the Ilkhan Hulegu, sent a letter to the French king, soliciting his military aid; this letter, however, never reached France.

=== Return to France ===
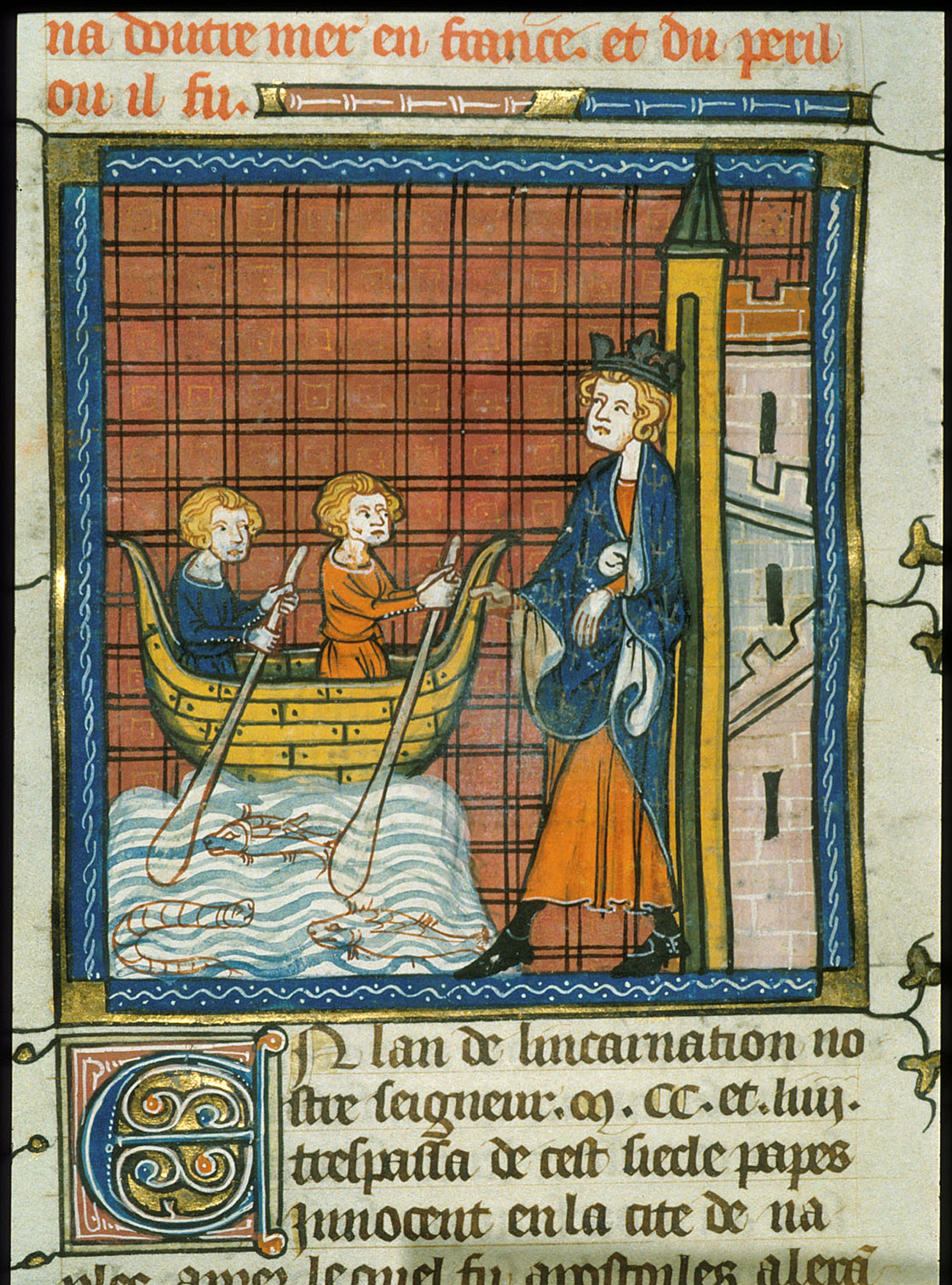
Louis IX sailing for France, from Chroniques de France, 14th century

Louis IX returned to France in 1254 after spending four years in the Holy Land following his release from captivity during the failed Seventh Crusade. He set out from Acre on 24 April 1254, and arrived back in France in July of that year. The kingdom had been ruled by a regency in his absence, headed by the king's mother Blanche of Castile until her death in November 1252.

Jean de Joinville's narrative of the king's return home from crusade in July 1254 is marked by two fateful meetings. Upon disembarking at Hyères, forty miles east along the coast from Marseille, Louis and his entourage were met almost immediately by the abbot of Cluny, who presented him and the queen with two palfreys that Joinville estimated to be worth, by the standards of the first decade of the 1300s, five hundred livre tournois. The next day, the abbot returned to tell the king of his troubles, to which the king patiently and attentively listened. After the abbot's departure, Joinville posed to Louis whether the gift of the palfreys had made the king more favorable to the abbot's petition, and, when Louis replied in the affirmative, advised him that those men entrusted with administering the king's justice should be forbidden from accepting gifts, lest they "listen more willingly and with greater attention to those who gave them."

While still at Hyères, the king heard of a renowned Franciscan named Hugues de Digne active in the area and, ever the enthusiast for sermons, requested that the friar attend the court so that Louis might hear him preach.

=== Diplomatic relations and treaties ===
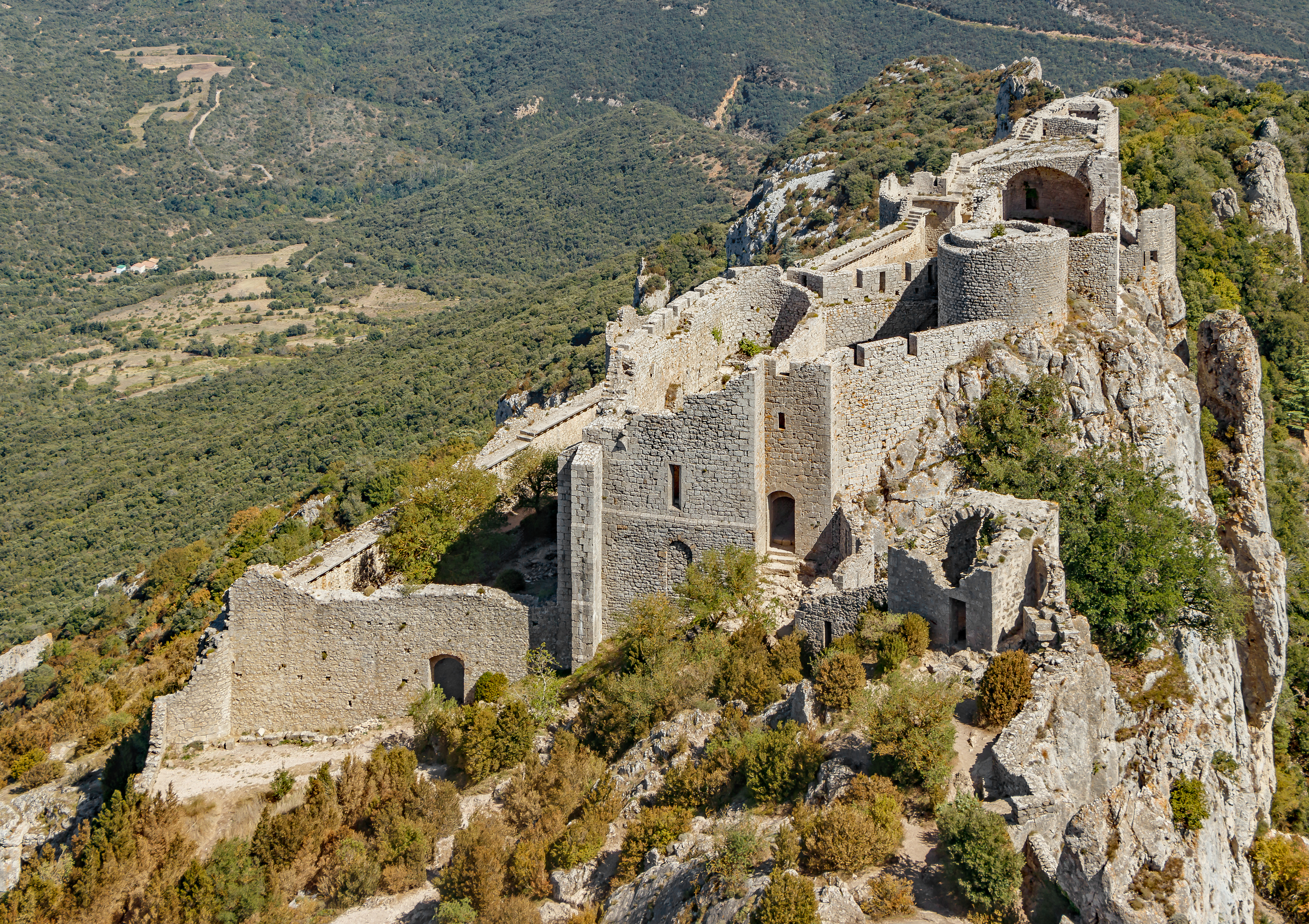
The now-ruined Peyrepertuse Castle, one of the strategic strongholds ceded by James I of Aragon in accordance with Treaty of Corbeil (1258)

After returning to France in 1254, Louis IX prioritized diplomatic settlements to resolve many longstanding territorial disputes and stabilize his kingdom's borders. In 1258, he concluded the Treaty of Corbeil with James I of Aragon. According to the terms of this treaty, Louis IX renounced ancient French claims of feudal overlordship over Catalonia (the Hispanic March), while James had to renounce all claims to several territories in southern France, including Languedoc, Provence, Toulouse, Quercy, and others, except for Montpellier and Carlat. Isabella, daughter of James I, was also betrothed to Philip, son of Louis IX securing peace with Aragon.

In 1259, Louis concluded the Treaty of Paris with Henry III of England. Henry III formally renounced all claims to Normandy, Anjou, Maine, Touraine, and Poitou-territories lost by his predecessors. In return, Louis IX recognized Henry III as Duke of Aquitaine and his vassal for Guyenne and Gascony, with Henry retaining control over these regions but under French suzerainty. The Treaty of Paris had already positioned Louis as a respected mediator in European affairs, and in January 1264, Henry III formally requested Louis IX to arbitrate the dispute between the crown and the barons. Louis convened the Mise of Amiens, a judgement that annulled the Provisions of Oxford and sided decisively with Henry, rejecting the baronial reforms. This ruling emboldened Henry's position but also deepened the conflict, as the barons, led by Simon de Montfort, 6th Earl of Leicester, refused to accept the decision, which led to renewed warfare after 1264.

Louis IX's diplomatic reach extended across Western Europe and even into the Near East and Central Asia, earning him a reputation as one of the foremost arbitrators of his age. The king maintained diplomatic relations with the Mongols even after returning to France and in 1260, as the Mongols under Hulagu Khan sacked Baghdad and advanced into Syria, Louis maintained correspondence with Ilkhanate leaders, hoping to coordinate attacks against their mutual Mamluk adversaries.

King Louis IX also maintained diplomatic relations with Emperor Frederick II and frequently corresponded with him, but their relationship was far from cordial. The contemporary Arab historian Ibn Wasil mentions a letter that the emperor sent to Louis, after the latter's release from captivity, in order "to remind him of his (own) sound advice and the consequences of his obstinacy and recalcitrance, and to upbraid him for it". There is no other record of this letter, but Frederick did write to King Ferdinand III of Castile blaming the pope for a disaster that could have been avoided; in this letter, the emperor links "papal cunning" to "the fate of our beloved friend, the illustrious King of France". Frederick II also allegedly sent secret letters and envoys to Sultan As-Salih Ayyub of Egypt, warning him of Louis IX's impending crusade and offering to delay or disrupt the French king's campaign.

King Louis IX enjoyed unparalleled prestige throughout Christendom and was respected even by his opponents as he was considered to be the 'Most Christian King' (rex Christianissimus). This title adopted by the French kings was later confirmed by the pope, while further papal concessions cemented France as the "eldest daughter of the church". The king's influence was rooted not in military dominance but in widespread respect for his fairness, personal integrity, and reputation as a Christian ruler. European monarchs and nobles frequently sought his judgment in disputes, viewing him as an impartial and principled mediator.

== Later reign (1267–1270) ==
=== Eighth Crusade and death ===
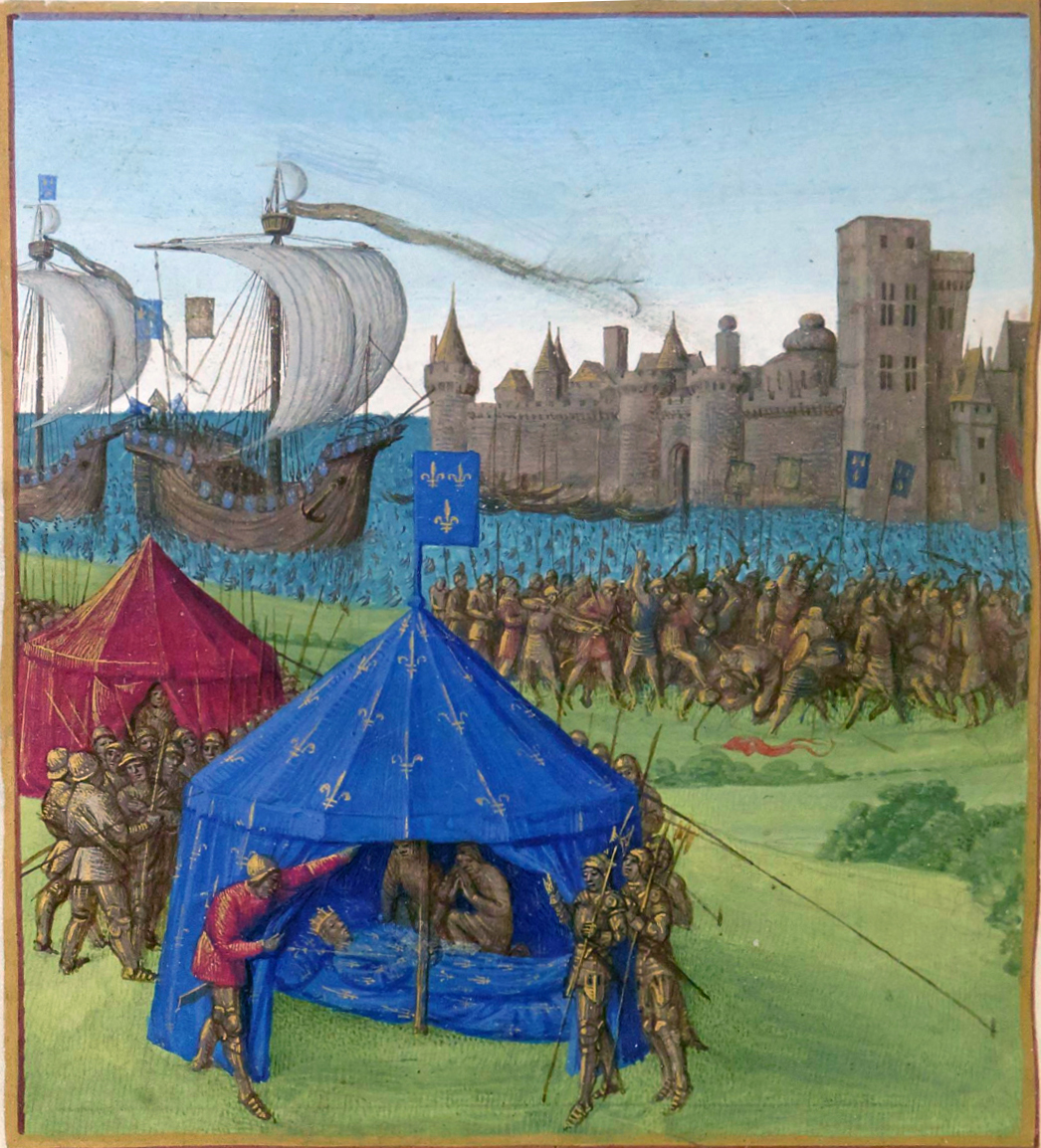
Death of Saint Louis: On 25 August 1270, Saint Louis dies in his tent, ornamented with royal symbols, near Tunis. Illuminated by Jean Fouquet, Grandes Chroniques de France (1455–1460).

In a parliament held at Paris, 24 March 1267, Louis and his three sons "took the cross". On hearing the reports of the missionaries, Louis resolved to land at Tunis, and he ordered his younger brother, Charles of Anjou, to join him there. The crusaders, among whom was the English prince Edward Longshanks, landed at Carthage 17 July 1270, but disease broke out in the camp.

Louis died at Tunis on 25 August 1270, during an epidemic of dysentery that swept through his army. According to European custom, his body was subjected to the process known as mos Teutonicus prior to most of his remains being returned to France. Louis was succeeded as King of France by his son, Philip III.

Louis's younger brother, Charles I of Naples, preserved his heart and intestines, and conveyed them for burial in the Cathedral of Monreale near Palermo.

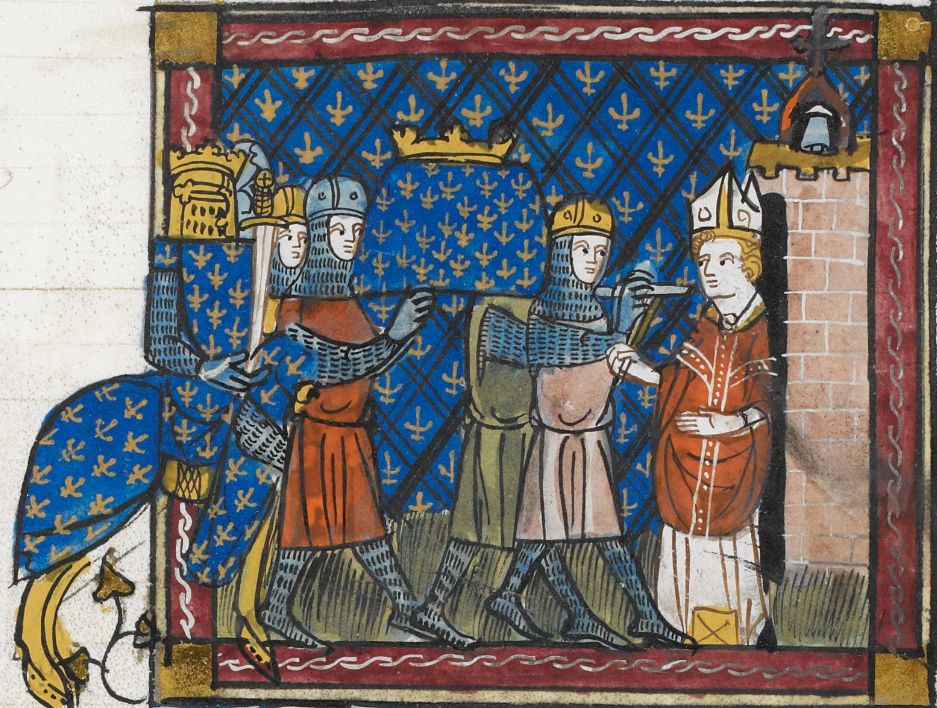
Louis's body returning, from a copy of the crusade treatise Directorium ad passagium

Louis's bones were carried overland in a lengthy processional across Sicily, Italy, the Alps, and France, until they were interred in the royal necropolis at Saint-Denis in May 1271. Charles and Philip III later dispersed a number of relics to promote Louis's veneration.

== Issue ==
1. Blanche (12 July/4 December 1240 – 29 April 1244), died in infancy.
2. Isabella (2 March 1241 – 28 January 1271), married Theobald II of Navarre.
3. Louis (23 September 1243/24 February 1244 – 11 January/2 February 1260). Betrothed to Berengaria of Castile in Paris on 20 August 1255.
4. Philip III (1 May 1245 – 5 October 1285), married firstly to Isabella of Aragon in 1262 and secondly to Maria of Brabant in 1274.
5. John (1246/1247 – 10 March 1248), died in infancy.
6. John Tristan (8 April 1250 – 3 August 1270), Count of Valois, married Yolande II, Countess of Nevers.
7. Peter (1251 – 6/7 April 1284), Count of Perche and Alençon, married Joanne of Châtillon.
8. Blanche (early 1253 – 17 June 1320), married Ferdinand de la Cerda, Infante of Castile.
9. Margaret (early 1255 – July 1271), married John I, Duke of Brabant.
10. Robert (1256 – 7 February 1317), Count of Clermont, married Beatrice of Burgundy. The French crown devolved upon his male-line descendant, Henry IV (the first Bourbon king), when the legitimate male line of Philip III died out in 1589.
11. Agnes (1260 – 19/20 December 1327), married Robert II, Duke of Burgundy.

Louis and Margaret's two children who died in infancy were first buried at the Cistercian abbey of Royaumont. In 1820 they were transferred and reinterred to Saint-Denis Basilica.

== Veneration as a saint ==
Saint Louis
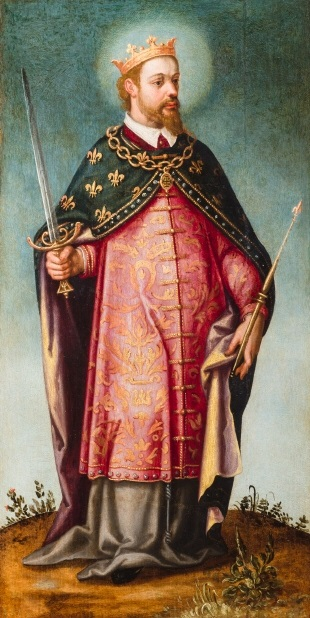
- San Luis, Rey de Francia (English: Saint Louis, King of France) by Francisco Pacheco

King of France Confessor
- Venerated in: Catholic Church; Anglican Communion
- Canonized: 11 July 1297, Rome, Papal States by Pope Boniface VIII
- Feast: 25 August
- Attributes: The crown of thorns, crown, sceptre, globus cruciger, sword, fleur-de-lis, mantle, and the other parts of the French regalia
- Patronage: France; Third Order of Saint Francis; The French Monarchy; Archdiocese of New Orleans; Diocese of Port-Louis; barbers; grooms

Pope Boniface VIII proclaimed the canonization of Louis in 1297; he is the only French king to be declared a saint. Louis IX is often considered the model of the ideal Christian monarch. His faults in modern eyes, that of "vicious" antisemitism and disastrous Crusading, have also been viewed as evidence of a ethical and spiritual consistency, an admirable quality of a good ruler.

Named in his honour, the Sisters of Charity of St. Louis is a Roman Catholic religious order founded in Vannes, France, in 1803. A similar order, the Sisters of St Louis, was founded in Juilly in 1842.

He is honoured as co-patron of the Third Order of St. Francis, which claims him as a member of the Order. When he became king, over a hundred poor people were served meals in his house on ordinary days. Often the king served these guests himself. His acts of charity, coupled with his devout religious practices, gave rise to the legend that he joined the Third Order of St. Francis, though it is unlikely that he ever actually joined the order.

The Roman Catholic and Episcopal Churches honor him with a feast day on 25 August.

== Named after Saint Louis ==
- The French royal Order of Saint Louis (1693–1790 and 1814–1830)

=== Places ===
Many countries in which French speakers and Catholicism were prevalent named places after King Louis:

- San Luis Province in Argentina
- San Luis Potosí in Mexico
- San Luis Rio Colorado, Sonora, Mexico
- Multiple locations in the United States
  - St. Louis, Missouri, named by French colonists
  - St. Louis County, Missouri
  - St. Louis County, Minnesota
  - San Luis Rey, Oceanside, California, named by the Franciscans who built one of the California missions there.
  - San Luis, Colorado
- Multiple locations in France
  - Île Saint-Louis, an island in the river Seine, Paris
  - Saint-Louis, New Caledonia
- Multiple locations in Canada
- Saint-Louis, Senegal
- São Luís, Maranhão in Brazil
- The Philippines
  - San Luis, Aurora
  - San Luis, Batangas

=== Buildings ===
- France
  - Hôpital Saint-Louis, hospital in the 10th arrondissement of Parisurl=https://web.archive.org/web/20210825131540/http://ghparis10.aphp.fr/wp-content/blogs.dir/41/files/2019/07/Histoire-de-lhopital-Saint-Louis.pdf|url-status=dead}}</ref>
  - The Cathédrale Saint-Louis-des-Invalides in Paris
  - The Cathédrale Saint-Louis in La Rochelle
  - The Cathédrale Saint-Louis in Blois
  - The Cathédrale Saint-Louis in Fort-de-France
  - The Cathédrale Saint-Louis de Versailles in Versailles
- United States
  - The Basilica of St. Louis, King of France, completed in 1834 in St. Louis, Missouri
  - The Cathedral Basilica of Saint Louis, completed in 1914 in St. Louis, Missouri
  - The Cathedral-Basilica of Saint Louis, King of France (St. Louis Cathedral), completed in 1850s in New Orleans, Louisiana
  - The Saint Louis Roman Catholic Church and School in Clarksville, Maryland, established in 1855 and 1923, respectively.
  - Saint Louis Catholic Church and School in Fairfax County, Virginia.
  - The St. Louis King of France Catholic Church and School, in Metairie, Louisiana
  - Saint Louis Catholic High School, in Lake Charles, Louisiana
  - St. Louis the King Catholic Church, in Marquette, Michigan
  - St. Louis Catholic Church and School, in Memphis, Tennessee
  - Saint Louis King of France Catholic Church and School, in Austin, Texas
  - Saint Louis Catholic Church, in Waco, Texas
  - Mission San Luis Rey de Francia, Oceanside, California, founded 12 June 1798
  - San Luis Rey Mission, Chamberino, New Mexico
  - Saint Louis Besancon Catholic Church, New Haven Indiana https://www.stlouisb.org/historystlouis
  - St. Louis Roman Catholic Church in Buffalo, New York (Mother Church of the Roman Catholic Diocese of Buffalo)
  - St. Louis Catholic Church and School, Castroville, Texas
- The national church of France in Rome: San Luigi dei Francesi in Italian, or Saint Louis of France in English
- The Cathedral of St Louis in Plovdiv, Bulgaria
- The Cathedral of St Louis in Carthage, Tunisia, so named because Louis IX died at that approximate location in 1270
- The Church of St Louis in Moscow, Russia
- India
  - Rue Saint Louis of Pondicherry
  - St. Louis Church, Dahisar West, Mumbai
- The St. Louis the King Cathedral in Haifa
- The Saint Louis Cathedral of the Capuchin Fathers in Beirut
- The Cathédrale Saint-Louis in Port Louis
- The Cathédrale Saint-Louis in Saint-Louis, Senegal
- The Convent of Saint Louis and Catholic High School in Carrickmacross, Ireland.
- St-Louis-de-France church, in Toronto, Canada.

== Notable portraits ==
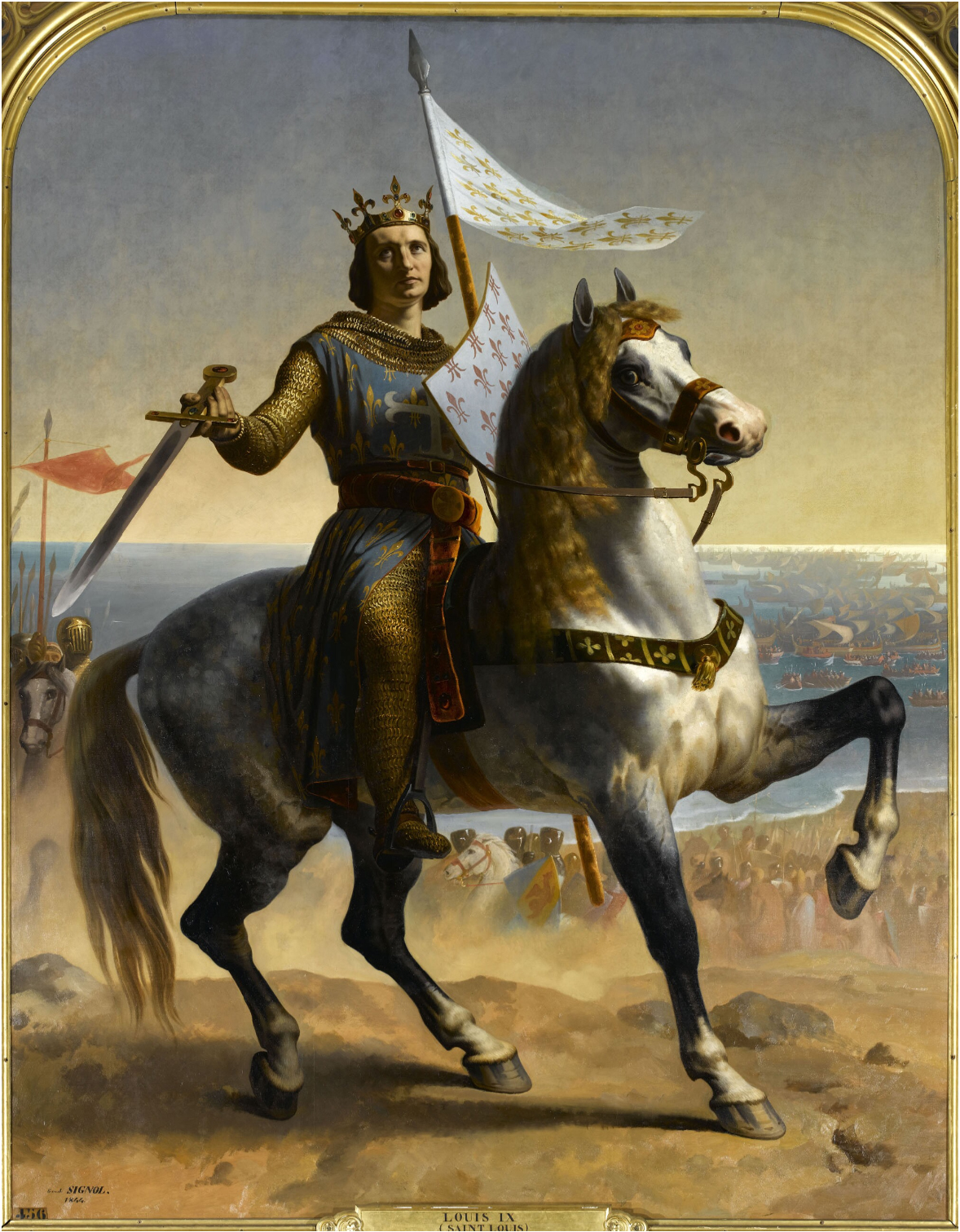
Louis IX by Émile Signol, 1844

France

- Saint Louis Mediating Between the King of England and His Barons by Georges Rouget, 1820
- Louis IX by Émile Signol, 1844
- The Glorification of Saint Louis by Alexandre Cabanel, 1853
- The Equestrian Statue of Louis IX, Paris, by Hippolyte Lefèbvre, which stands outside of the Basilica of the Sacred Heart at Montmartre.

United States

- A bas-relief of St. Louis is one of the carved portraits of historic lawmakers that adorn the chamber of the United States House of Representatives.
- Saint Louis is also portrayed on a frieze depicting a timeline of important lawgivers throughout world history, on the North Wall of the Courtroom at the Supreme Court of the United States.
- A statue of St. Louis by the sculptor John Donoghue stands on the roofline of the New York State Appellate Division Court at 27 Madison Avenue in New York City.
- The Apotheosis of St. Louis is an equestrian statue of the saint, by Charles Henry Niehaus, that stands in front of the Saint Louis Art Museum in Forest Park.
- A heroic portrait by Baron Charles de Steuben hangs in the Basilica of the National Shrine of the Assumption of the Blessed Virgin Mary in Baltimore. An 1821 gift of King Louis XVIII of France, it depicts St. Louis burying his plague-stricken troops before the siege of Tunis at the beginning of the Eighth Crusade in 1270.

== In fiction ==
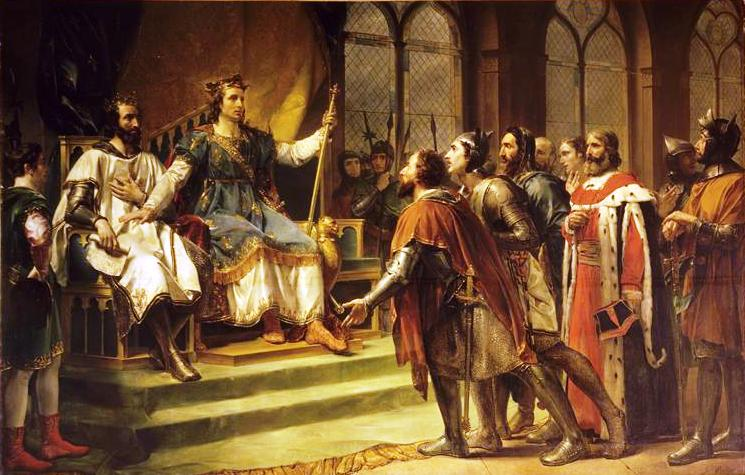
Saint Louis Mediating Between the King of England and His Barons by Georges Rouget, 1820

- Louis IX, play by Jacques-François Ancelot, 1819
- Davis, William Stearns, "Falaise of the Blessed Voice" aka "The White Queen". New York: Macmillan, 1904
- Peter Berling, The Children of the Grail
- Jules Verne, "To the Sun?/Off on a Comet!" A comet takes several bits of the Earth away when it grazes the Earth. Some people, taken up at the same time, find the Tomb of Saint Louis is one of the bits, as they explore the comet.
- Adam Gidwitz, The Inquisitor's Tale
- Dante Alighieri, Divina Commedia. It is likely that Dante hides the figure of the Saint King behind the Veltro, the Messo di Dio, the Veglio di Creta and the "515", which is a duplicate of the Messo. This is a trinitarian representation to oppose to the analogous representation of his grandson Philip IV the Fair, as the Beast from the Sea. The idea came to Dante from the transposition of the Revelation of St. John in the history, studied from the abbot and theologian Joachim of Fiore.
- Theodore de Bainville, poem, "La Ballade des Pendus (Le Verger du Roi Louis)"; musicalized by Georges Brassens.

== Music ==
- Arnaud du Prat, Paris canon; Rhymed, chanted office for St. Louis, 1290, Sens Bib. Mun. MS6, and elsewhere.
- Marc-Antoine Charpentier, Motet for Saint Louis, H.320, for 1 voice, 2 treble instruments (?) and continuo 1675.
- Marc-Antoine Charpentier, Motet In honorem santi Ludovici Regis Galliae canticum tribus vocibus cum symphonia, H.323, for 3 voices, 2 treble instruments and continuo (1678 ?)
- Marc-Antoine Charpentier, Motet In honorem Sancti Ludovici regis Galliae, H.332, for 3 voices, 2 treble instruments and continuo (1683)
- Marc-Antoine Charpentier, Motet In honorem Sancti Ludovici regis Galliae canticum, H.365 & H.365 a, for soloists, chorus, woodwinds, strings and continuo (1690)
- Marc-Antoine Charpentier, Motet In honorem Sancti Ludovici regis Galliae, H.418, for soloists, chorus, 2 flutes, 2 violins and continuo (1692–93)

== See also ==
- List of royal saints and martyrs

Louis IX of France House of Capet Born: 25 April 1214 Died: 25 August 1270
Regnal titles
Preceded by Louis VIII	King of France; 8 November 1226 – 25 August 1270	Succeeded by Philip III
