= William of Chartres (Dominican) =

William of Chartres (French: Guillaume de Chartres; Latin: Guillelmus Carnotensis) was a royal chaplain under King Louis IX of France from 1254 and then a Dominican friar from 1264. He took part in two crusades in 1248 and 1270 and wrote a biography of Louis. This last work contains the earliest surviving collection of miracles attributed to Louis after his death in 1270. William died between 1277 and 1282.

== Life ==
=== Royal courtier and chaplain ===
Little is known about William. He or at least his family was presumably from Chartres. He was probably of "lower class non-noble origins". He may be the William of Chartres described as a cleric and scholar at Vercelli who stood as surety for some Frenchmen studying in Italy in 1231. He was employed at the royal court by 1248. At the time, he was a secular cleric. He may have been brought to the king's attention by Robert of Douai, the queen's physician.

William was a part of Louis's inner circle during the Seventh Crusade. He went into captivity along with the king in 1250. In March 1251, Louis provided William's two sisters and their eldest sons with an income from rents. He returned to France with Louis after a period in the Kingdom of Jerusalem in 1254. That year William became a canon of Saint-Quentin. He is referred to in documents of this time as "Lord William" and was attached to the royal chapel. In 1254–1255, acting as a royal agent, he purchased properties on the left bank of the Seine for the Sorbonne. One of the properties was a house of Robert of Douai. In 1255–1256, he was rewarded with a horse and a cape.

By February 1259, Louis had appointed William treasurer of Saint-Frambourg de Senlis. A document of 1261 calls him a priest. On 6 July 1262, William signed as a witness the treaty of friendship between Louis IX and James I of Aragon on the occasion of the marriage of Louis's son, Philip, and James's daughter, Isabella.

=== Dominican crusader ===
According to his own account, William held the office of treasurer for five and a half years. He is last recorded in that capacity in December 1263 and must have entered the Dominican Order the following year. He resided in the Parisian convent of Saint-Jacques on the left bank. In 1269–1270, he took part in the preparations of the Eighth Crusade. He joined the expedition as a royal confessor, took possession of the royal seal after the death of the archdeacon of Paris on 20 August and was at Louis's side when the king died.

Following Louis's death, William was sent back to France by Louis's successor, Philip III, along with two other friars, Geoffrey of Beaulieu and John of Mons. The three carried four letters from Philip dated 12 September 1270 informing the ecclesiastical and lay magnates of the kingdom of Louis's death and confirming Matthew of Vendôme and Simon of Nesle in the regency. They travelled by way of Sicily and Italy, crossing the Alps and arriving at Paris by early October. William remained in Paris for the next three years, working as a parish priest.

=== Death ===
William began work on his biography of Louis IX after January 1273, after the death of Geoffrey of Beaulieu, who had written his own biography of Louis, and seemingly while Pope Gregory X was still alive. He was most likely actively writing in 1274–1275. The last record of William is an undated letter he wrote to his brother-in-law, Gilles de la Chaussée, probably in 1277. In it he informs Gilles that he has secured letters from Philip III asking Matthew of Vendôme to receive Gilles's son Matthew into the Abbey of Saint-Denis. William was probably dead by 1282, since he did not testify at the inquiry for Louis's canonization.

== Works ==
Three sermon's preached by William are preserved. These were preached on 2 February 1273 at Saint-Leufroy and on 12 and 19 February at La Madeleine. They are found in the Bibliothèque nationale de France (BnF), MS lat. 16481. Pierre Daunou considered them poor sermons and not worth publishing. They are still unedited. In the Archives Nationales, carton J 1030, document no. 59 is the autograph of William's letter to his brother-in-law.

On the Life and Deeds of Louis, King of the Franks of Famous Memory, and on the Miracles That Declare His Sanctity, William's Latin biography of Louis IX, is preserved alongside Geoffrey of Beaulieu's in a single manuscript, BnF, MS lat. 13778, at folios 41v–64v. William's work was never as widely cited as Geoffrey's. It is also shorter and lacks chapter headings. Both works are hagiography, intended to demonstrate Louis's sainthood. Geoffrey's was the first and William's the second biography of Louis IX and both texts have often been printed together.

William wrote his work as a companion piece of Geoffrey's. He enumerated four areas where he intended to complete Geoffrey's biography: "the good days of [Louis's] rule", his imprisonment, his death and the miracles that had occurred at his tomb and through his intercession. It is in the first of these areas that William's biography is most interesting to modern historians. In recounting the justness of Louis's administration—e.g., his suppression of private warfare and trial by battle—On the Life and Deeds reads at times like a mirror of princes. It is the only eyewitness account of Louis's captivity.

Like standard hagiographies of the time, On the Life and Deeds consists of two basic parts: the life (vita) proper and the miracles (miracula). Paragraphs 1–3 of contain metaphors comparing Louis to the sun among stars and the Biblical king Josiah. He also describes Geoffrey's biography and his own purpose and method. Paragraph 4 is a description of Louis's institution of an annual procession of the relic of the crown of thorns at Sainte-Chapelle. Paragraph 5 describes how the king kept the Sabbath (Sunday). Most of the remainder of the work keeps to the themes neglected by Geoffrey. Paragraphs 6–10 cover the Seventh Crusade and Louis's captivity in Egypt; Louis's government of France is covered in paragraphs 12–27; his illness and death in 37–42; and seventeen posthumous miracles in 43–60 (with an introductory paragraph and one paragraph per miracle). William breaks with his declared themes at paragraph 11, where he tells how Louis had predicted that he would become a Dominican, and paragraphs 28–36, which describe Louis's various acts of religious devotion: footwashing, fasting, almsgiving, caring for lepers, building hospitals for the poor and endowing friaries and churches.

William's seventeen miracles form the earliest collection of miracles attributed to Louis. All took place between October 1270 and August 1271. William presents all the miracles as properly authenticated, usually dated, and apparently collected many of the accounts himself. He may have had access to the list of miracles kept at Saint-Denis by Thomas Hauxton on Philip III's orders. All seventeen recorded by William were later included in the Beatus Ludovicus, which assured them a wider audience than On the Life and Deeds received.

== Bibliography ==
- Carolus-Barré, Louis (1995). "Guillaume de Chartres clerc du roi, frère prêcheur, ami et historien de saint Louis". Collection de l'École française de Rome. 204: 51–57.
- Delisle, Léopold (1904). "Lettre de Saint Louis expédiée par Guillaume de Chartres". Bibliothèque de l'École des chartes. 65: 310–312.
- Gaposchkin, M. Cecilia; Field, Sean L., eds. (2014). The Sanctity of Louis IX: Early Lives of Saint Louis by Geoffrey of Beaulieu and William of Chartres. Translated by Larry F. Field. Cornell University Press.
- Jordan, William C. (2012). Men at the Center: Redemptive Governance under Louis IX. Central European University Press.
- Labarge, Margaret Wade (1968). Saint Louis: Louis IX, Most Christian King of France. Brown, Little and Company.
- Le Goff, Jacques (2009) [1996]. Saint Louis. Translated by Gareth Evan Gollrad. University of Notre Dame Press.
- Richard, Jean (1992) [1983]. Saint Louis: Crusader King of France. Translated by Jean Birrell. Cambridge University Press.
