= Saint Louis Mediating Between the King of England and His Barons =

Painting by Georges Rouget

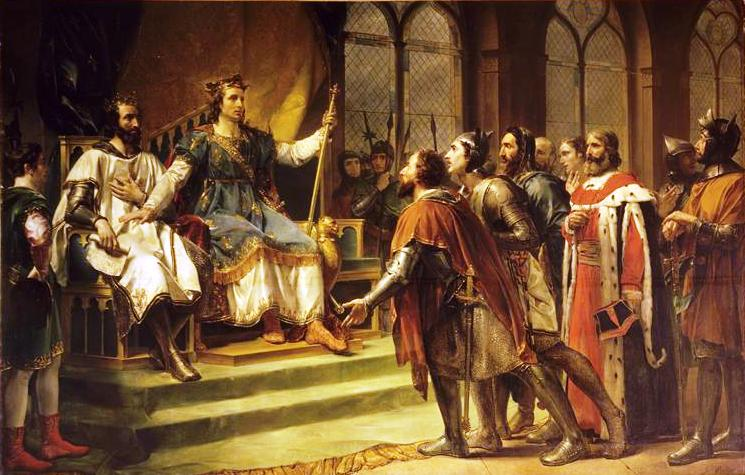
- Artist: Georges Rouget
- Year: 1820
- Type: Oil on canvas, history painting
- Dimensions: 360 cm × 485 cm (140 in × 191 in)
- Location: Palace of Versailles; Versailles

Saint Louis Mediating Between the King of England and His Barons (French: Saint Louis médiateur entre le roi d'Angleterre et ses barons) is an 1820 history painting by the French artist Georges Rouget. It depicts a scene from 23 January 1264 when Louis IX of France presided over the Mise of Amiens, a settlement between Henry III of England and his rebellious barons led by Simon de Montfort, 6th Earl of Leicester. The attempted mediation ultimately failed, leading to the Second Barons' War.

The painting was commissioned by Louis XVIII as a design for a planned tapestry for the throne room at the Tuileries Palace. It was part of a policy of producing art celebrating France's royal history during the Bourbon Restoration following the final abdication of Napoleon in 1815. It was displayed at the Salon of 1822 held at the Louvre in Paris. It is now in the Salles des Croisades at the Palace of Versailles.

== Bibliography ==
- Chaudonneret, Marie-Claude. Adolphe Thiers, critique d'art: salons de 1822 et de 1824. Champion, 2005.
- Constans, Claire & Lamarque, Philippe. Les Salles des croisades, Château de Versailles. Château de Versailles, 2002.
