= Roberto Devereux =

Opera by Gaetano Donizetti

- tragedia lirica by Gaetano Donizetti
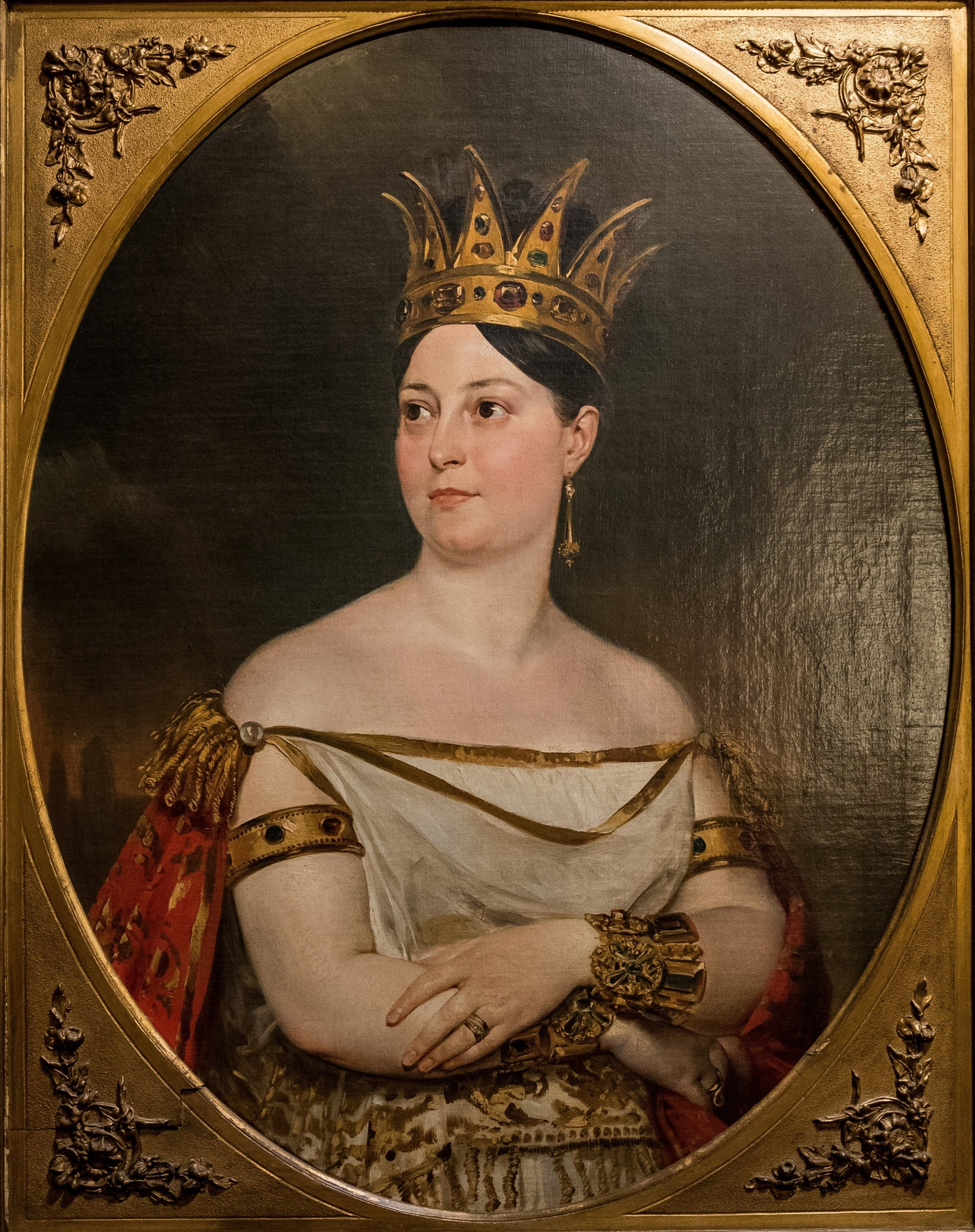
- Giuseppina Ronzi de Begnis, the first singer of the part of Elisabetta, painting by Karl Briullov
- Librettist: Salvadore Cammarano
- Language: Italian
- Based on: Elizabeth of England by François Ancelot
- Premiere: 28 October 1837; Teatro San Carlo, Naples

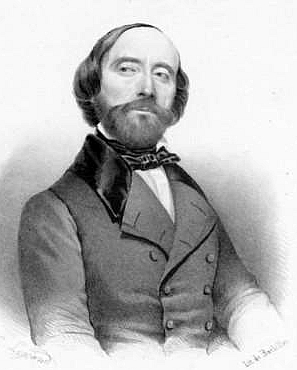
Paul Barroilhet: The Duke of Nottingham

Roberto Devereux (in full Roberto Devereux, ossia Il conte di Essex, Italian: [roˈbɛrto deveˈrø osˈsiːa il ˈkonte di ˈɛsseks]; "Robert Devereux, or the Earl of Essex") is an 1837 tragedia lirica (tragic opera) in three acts by Gaetano Donizetti. The opera is loosely based on the life of the English military commander Robert Devereux, 2nd Earl of Essex, an influential member of the court of Queen Elizabeth I.

Salvadore Cammarano wrote the Italian-language libretto based on François Ancelot's French tragedy Elizabeth of England (Paris, 1832), with some of the text taken from Felice Romani's libretto for Saverio Mercadante's opera Il conte d'Essex (Milan, 1833), also based on Ancelot's play. Cammarano's libretto also incorporated elements from the 1787 French play Histoire secrète des amours d'Elisabeth et du comte d'Essex (1787) by Jacques Lescène des Maisons. Devereux was the subject of at least two earlier French plays, both titled Le Comte d'Essex: one in 1638 by Gauthier de Costes, seigneur de la Calprenède, and one in 1678 by Thomas Corneille.

It is one of a number of operas by Donizetti which deal with the Tudor period of English history and which include Anna Bolena (about Anne Boleyn), Maria Stuarda (about Mary, Queen of Scots) and Il castello di Kenilworth. The lead female characters – Anne Boleyn, Mary Stuart and Elizabeth herself – have been referred to as the "Three Donizetti Queens." They became popular in the 1970s, when the American soprano Beverly Sills promoted them as a series at New York City Opera.

It has been said that, "although the plot plays fast and loose with history, the opera carries its own brand of dramatic conviction".

== Origin ==
The contract for a new opera seria for the Teatro San Carlo in Naples was concluded in spring 1837. The generation of Roberto Devereux was overshadowed by serious crises in the life of the composer. During the previous year, Donizetti had lost both his parents and then his wife Virginia Vaselli delivered a stillborn baby. In June 1837, another child died during birth. On 30 July, his wife died at the age of 28. Rehearsals for the premiere began at the end of August 1837; most of the score had to be written in the month following his wife's death. Additionally, a cholera epidemic delayed again the start of rehearsals.

Salvatore Cammarano's libretto is very truthful to Jacques-François Ancelot's tragedy, a romantic rewrite of the material already dealt with by Thomas Corneille and La Calprenède in France, to which he added individual touches from Lescènes's Histoire. The plot is hardly original, mainly derived from Felice Romani's libretto Il Conte d'Essex of 1833, originally set by Saverio Mercadante. Romani's widow charged Cammarano with plagiarism; the practice of stealing plots was very common between rival Italian opera houses.

== Performance history ==
19th century

Roberto Devereux was first performed on 28 October 1837 at the Teatro di San Carlo, Naples. Within a few years, the opera's success had caused it to be performed in most European cities including Paris on 27 December 1838, for which he wrote an overture which quoted, anachronistically, "God Save the Queen"; London on 24 June 1841; Rome in 1849; Palermo in 1857; in Pavia in 1859 and 1860; and in Naples on 18 December 1865. Also, it was given in New York on 15 January 1849, but it would appear that after 1882, no further performances were given during the 19th century.

20th century and beyond

The beginning of the 20th century revivals of Roberto Devereux started at the San Carlo in Naples in 1964, the revival starring Leyla Gencer. Montserrat Caballé appeared in a combination of concert performances and staged productions between December 1965 and 1978. Roberto Devereux was first performed by the New York City Opera in October 1970 as the first part of the "Three Queens" trilogy, starring Placido Domingo and Beverly Sills. It was performed on a regular basis in European houses during the 1980s and in concert versions by the Opera Orchestra of New York in January 1991 (with Vladimir Chernov), the Royal Opera House, Covent Garden, in July 2002, and Washington Concert Opera in 2004.

In 2005 the Bavarian State Opera's Munich production starring Edita Gruberová was recorded on DVD by Deutsche Grammophon.

In 2009, performances were given by the Dallas Opera, the Las Palmas Opera, the Opera Holland Park Festival, while 2010 saw productions in Mannheim and Rome as well as by the Minnesota Opera and again Munich's Bavarian State Opera plus its first performance in Quebec in November of that year at the Opéra de Montréal. Welsh National Opera presented this opera (along with the other two "Three Queens" operas) in succession over three evenings beginning in October 2013.

After having debuted the role of Elisabetta at the Opéra de Marseille in 2011, Mariella Devia sang the opera in concert at Maggio Musicale Fiorentino on 18 May 2014 and with the Opera Orchestra of New York (OONY) on 5 June 2014. In 2015 she performed it onstage at the Teatro Real de Madrid and resumed it again in 2016 at the Teatro Carlo Felice of Genoa.

The Metropolitan Opera New York performed the opera for the first time in 2016, in a production by David McVicar, starring Sondra Radvanovsky, who also appeared the same season at the Met in the title roles of Donizetti's Anna Bolena and Maria Stuarda.

== Roles ==
Role	Voice type	Premiere cast, 29 October 1837 (Conductor: – )
Elisabetta, Queen of England	soprano	Giuseppina Ronzi de Begnis
The Duke of Nottingham	baritone	Paul Barroilhet
Sara, Duchess of Nottingham	mezzo-soprano	Almerinda Manzocchi Granchi
Roberto Devereux, Earl of Essex	tenor	Giovanni Basadonna
Lord Cecil	tenor	Timoleone Barattini
Sir Gualtiero Raleigh	bass	Anafesto Rossi
A page	contralto	
A servant of Nottingham	bass	Giuseppe Benedetti
Lords of the parliament, knights, squires, pages, guards of Nottingham

== Synopsis ==
Place: London, England
Time: 1601, during the reign of Queen Elizabeth I

Robert Devereux, 2nd Earl of Essex, favorite of Queen Elisabeth, has been removed from office as Governor of Ireland because, acting on his own initiative, he has agreed to a ceasefire with the rebels. Following an attempted uprising, he is awaiting his trial for high treason in London.

=== Act 1 ===
Scene 1: The Great Hall at Westminster

Sara, Duchess of Nottingham, is trying in vain to hide her tears from the eyes of the Court, as she reads the sad story of Fair Rosamond, the unfortunate lover of King Henry II of England, and therein recognizes a very similar situation to her own. She is in love with Robert Devereux, her husband's closest friend. The Ladies of the court express concern, but she replies that she is happy, while privately revealing her sadness (All'afflitto è dolce il pianto). Elizabeth enters and states that, at the insistence of Nottingham, she has agreed to see Robert once again, now that he has returned from Ireland accused of treason (Duchessa... Alle fervide preci). The Queen is willing to release him without charges if she can be sure of his continued loyalty. To Sara's gradual dismay, the Queen reveals her love for Robert (L'amor suo mi fe' beata). Cecil enters and announces that Parliament is waiting for an answer from the Queen regarding the charges against Robert, since it considers her too lenient towards him, but she refuses to sign the death warrant proposed by the Royal Council.

Robert enters and, in a conversation overheard by the increasingly distraught Sara, Elizabeth declares her love for him. Now alone together, Elizabeth promises Robert that the ring she once gave him will always be the pledge of his safety should he ever return it to her. The dream of bygone happy days is shattered by an inappropriate comment by Robert, who assumes that Elizabeth knows the secret of his love for Sara. The Queen, increasingly jealous, demands that Robert name the woman he loves. He denies that he loves anyone (Nascondi, frena i palpiti), and then the Queen leaves.

Nottingham, Robert's friend and supporter, enters and the two men discuss Robert's situation and Nottingham's concerns about his wife's behaviour after he has observed her embroidering a blue shawl (Forse in quel cor sensibile, Qui ribelle ognun ti chiama). The two men are interrupted by Cecil demanding that Nottingham attend a meeting of the Peers of the Realm.

Scene 2: Sara's Apartments at Nottingham House

Sara is alone when Robert enters, declaring her to be faithless because she has married Nottingham while he was in Ireland. She defends herself saying that it was the Queen's idea and that she was forced to do her bidding. At the same time, seeing the ring on Robert's finger, she assumes it to be a love token from the Queen, and tells him that they must never see each other again, giving him the blue shawl as a love token. In a final duet (Dacchè tornasti, ahi misera) each declares love for the other and they accept that they must say goodbye. Robert makes plans to escape.

=== Act 2 ===
The Great Hall at Westminster

The Queen approaches Cecil to find out what has been decided. Cecil declares that the sentence is death. The Queen, asking Raleigh why the whole process took so long, learns that Robert had a shawl in his possession which he resisted giving over. It is handed to her. Nottingham enters and pleads for Robert's life (Non venni mai si mesto), insisting that he is innocent, but the Queen continues to describe how she knows that Robert has been unfaithful and, when he is brought in, confronts him, showing him the scarf. Nottingham sees it as well and recognizes it. Furious, he declares that he will have vengeance; while at the same time, Elizabeth offers Robert his freedom if he reveals the name of her rival. He refuses and she signs the death warrant, announcing that a cannon shot will be heard as the axe falls. Nottingham fumes that the axe is not a suitable punishment.

=== Act 3 ===
Scene 1: Sara's Apartments

Alone, Sara receives Robert's ring along with a letter from him. In it, he tells her to take the ring to Elizabeth and beg for mercy. Before she can leave, Nottingham arrives and reads the letter (Non sai che un nume vindice). Although she protests her innocence, he prevents her from leaving. They both hear the funeral march for Robert as he is led to the Tower, and Nottingham leaves to exact his revenge on Robert. She faints.

Scene 2: The Tower of London

In his cell, Robert ponders as to why it appears that his ring has not been received by the Queen. But he refuses to betray Sara (Come uno spirto angelico... Bagnato il sen di lagrime), and when Cecil arrives at the door of the cell, it is not to free Robert but to take him to his execution. He is led away.

Scene 3: The Great Hall at Westminster

Elizabeth is mournful about the pending death of her lover and wonders why Sara is not there to give her comfort (Vivi ingrato, a lei d'accanto). Cecil announces that Robert is on his way to the block, and Sara arrives disheveled. She gives Elizabeth the ring along with confessing her guilt at being the Queen's rival. In vain, the Queen tries to stop the execution, but they hear the cannon announcing Robert's death. After Nottingham has arrived, Elizabeth demands to know why he prevented the ring from being brought to her. He replies: "Blood I wanted, and blood I got!" Elizabeth is haunted by the headless corpse of Robert, and longs for her own death, announcing that James Stuart (son of Mary Queen of Scots) will be king. Alone, she kisses Robert's ring.

== Music ==
Although not frequently performed today, it contains some of Donizetti's best vocal writing, some of it "first rate" (the end of act 1's duet between Roberto and Sara beginning with "Dacché tornasti, ahi misera" (Since you returned, ah miserable me!)), while the brief second act is "superb." The opera is raw and emotional; it is a powerful vehicle for the soprano. Some of the highlights include the act 1 duet between Elizabeth and Robert, "Nascondi, frena i palpiti" (Hide and check your wild beating / oh my unhappy heart). The final scene is one of the most dramatic and difficult in bel canto opera. As Elizabeth is going mad with the death of her lover, "Quel sangue versato" (That spilled blood / rises to heaven) pushes romantic opera to the limits of melodic expression and has been described as "mak(ing) a powerful end to one of Donizetti's finest and most affecting operas." The final bars contain six high As, one high B-flat and one high B natural, sometimes interpolated as an alt D natural.

== List of main arias and musical numbers ==
Act 1

- Sara- Romanza: "All'afflitto è dolce il pianto" : "To one who is sad, weeping is sweet".
- Elisabeth: "Duchessa... Alle fervide preci" : "Duchess... To your husband's eager requests".
- Elisabeth- Cavatina: "L'amor suo mi fe' beata" : "His love was a blessing to me"
- Robert: "Nascondi, frena i palpiti" : "Hide and check your wild beating"
- Nottingham- Cavatina: "Forse in quel cor sensibile... Qui ribelle ognun ti chiama" : "Perhaps in that sensitive heart... Here everyone calls you traitor"
- Sara and Robert- Duetto: "Da che tornasti, ahi misera" : "Since you returned, ah miserable me!"

Act 2

- Nottingham and Elisabeth- Duettino: "Non venni mai si mesto" : "Never had I come so saddened"
- Elisabeth, Nottingham and Robert- Terzetto: "Ecco l'indegno" : "Here is the unworthy one!"

Act 3

- Sara and Nottigham- Duetto: "Non sai che un nume vindice": "Don`t you know that betrayed husbands"
- Robert- Aria: "Come uno spirto angelico.. Bagnato il sen di lagrime" : "Like an angelic spirit.. With my breast bathed in tears"
- Elisabeth- Aria finale: "Vivi, ingrato, a lei d'accanto.. Quel sangue versato.." : "Live, ungrateful man at her side.. That spilled blood.."

== Recordings ==
Year	Cast (Elisabetta, Sara, Roberto, Nottingham)	Conductor, Opera House and Orchestra	Label
1964	Leyla Gencer, Anna Maria Rota, Ruggiero Bondino, Piero Cappuccilli	Mario Rossi, Teatro di San Carlo orchestra and chorus (Recording of a performance at the San Carlo, Napoli, 2 May)	CD: Opera d'Oro OPD 1159; Cat: OPD 1159
1968	Montserrat Caballé, Bianca Berini, Bernabé Martí, Piero Cappuccilli	Carlo Felice Cillario, Gran Teatre del Liceu Orchestra and Chorus (Recording of a performance in the Gran Teatre del Liceu, November)	CD: The Opera Lovers; Cat: ROB 196801
1969	Beverly Sills, Beverly Wolff, Róbert Ilosfalvy, Peter Glossop	Sir Charles Mackerras, Royal Philharmonic Orchestra and the Ambrosian Opera Chorus	CD: DG; Cat: 289 465 964-2
1970	Beverly Sills, Susanne Marsee, Plácido Domingo, Louis Quilico	Julius Rudel, New York City Opera orchestra and chorus (Recording of a performance at the New York City Opera, 18 October)	CD: HRE; Cat: HRE-374-3
1975	Beverly Sills, Susanne Marsee, John Alexander, Richard Fredricks	Julius Rudel, Filene Center Orchestra & Wolf Trap Company Chorus (Recording of Tito Capobianco's production, courtesy of the New York City Opera)	DVD: VAI; Cat: 4204
1994	Edita Gruberová, Delores Ziegler, Don Bernardini, Ettore Kim	Friedrich Haider; Orchestre philharmonique de Strasbourg and the Opéra du Rhin chorus (Recorded at concert performances in the Palais de la Musique et des Congres, Strasbourg, March)	CD: Nightingale; Cat: 190100-2
1998	Alexandrina Pendatchanska, Ildikó Komlósi, Giuseppe Sabbatini, Roberto Servile	Alain Guingal; Teatro di San Carlo orchestra and chorus (This appears to be a video recording of a performance in the Teatro San Carlo di Napoli, May or June)	DVD: Image Entertainment; Cat: ID 6943 ERDVD
2002	Nelly Miricioiu, Sonia Ganassi, José Bros, Roberto Frontali	Maurizio Benini; Royal Opera House, Covent Garden, orchestra and chorus (Recorded at concert performances in the Royal Opera House, Covent Garden, July)	CD: Opera Rara; Cat: ORC24
2005	Edita Gruberová, Jeanne Piland, Roberto Aronica, Albert Schagidullin	Friedrich Haider; Bavarian State Orchestra and Chorus (Video recording of a performance in the Nationaltheater, Munich, May)	DVD: Deutsche Grammophon; Cat: 073 418–5
2006	Dimitra Theodossiou, Federica Bragaglia, Massimiliano Pisapia, Andrew Schroeder	Marcello Rota; Orchestra and Chorus of Bergamo Musica Festival G. Donizetti (Audio and video recordings made at performances in the Teatro Donizetti di Bergamo, September)	CD: Naxos; Cat: 8.660222-23; DVD: Naxos; Cat: 8.2110232
2015	Mariella Devia, Silvia Tro Santafé, Gregory Kunde, Marco Caria	Bruno Campanella; Teatro Real Madrid, orchestra and chorus (Video recording of a performance in the Teatro Real, October)	Blu-ray: BelAir Classiques; Cat: BAC430; DVD: BelAir Classiques; Cat: BAC130
2016	Mariella Devia, Sonia Ganassi, Stefan Pop, Mansoo Kim	Francesco Lanzillotta; Teatro Carlo Felice orchestra and chorus (Performances in the Teatro Carlo Felice, Genoa, 20 and 24 March)	Blu-ray: Dynamic; Cat: 1080i60 DVD: Dynamic; Cat: 37755
2016	Sondra Radvanovsky, Elīna Garanča, Matthew Polenzani, Mariusz Kwiecien	Maurizio Benini; The Metropolitan Opera orchestra and chorus (Performance of 16 April)	Streaming HD video: Met Opera on Demand
