= Geoffrey of Beaulieu =

French biographer

Geoffrey of Beaulieu (died 9 or 10 January 1273×1276), from Évreux in Normandy, was a French friar and biographer.

== Biography ==
From a noble family, Geoffrey was a friar of the Dominican Order. Nothing is known of his early life. He became the confessor of Louis IX of France, and inspired such lasting confidence, that, finding himself head of the clergy surrounding the king, he could, better than anyone, gather the necessary material to become his royal master's historian. Geoffrey accompanied King Louis IX on crusades to Tunis and Egypt.

The manuscript of The Life of Saint Louis, which he was ordered to write by Pope Gregory X, was conserved for several centuries in the library of the Dominican order in Évreux, before being published in 1617 with the work of Jean de Joinville. Geoffrey's work was expanded shortly after his death by fellow Dominican William of Chartres.
