= Róbert Ilosfalvy =

Hungarian operatic tenor (1927–2009)

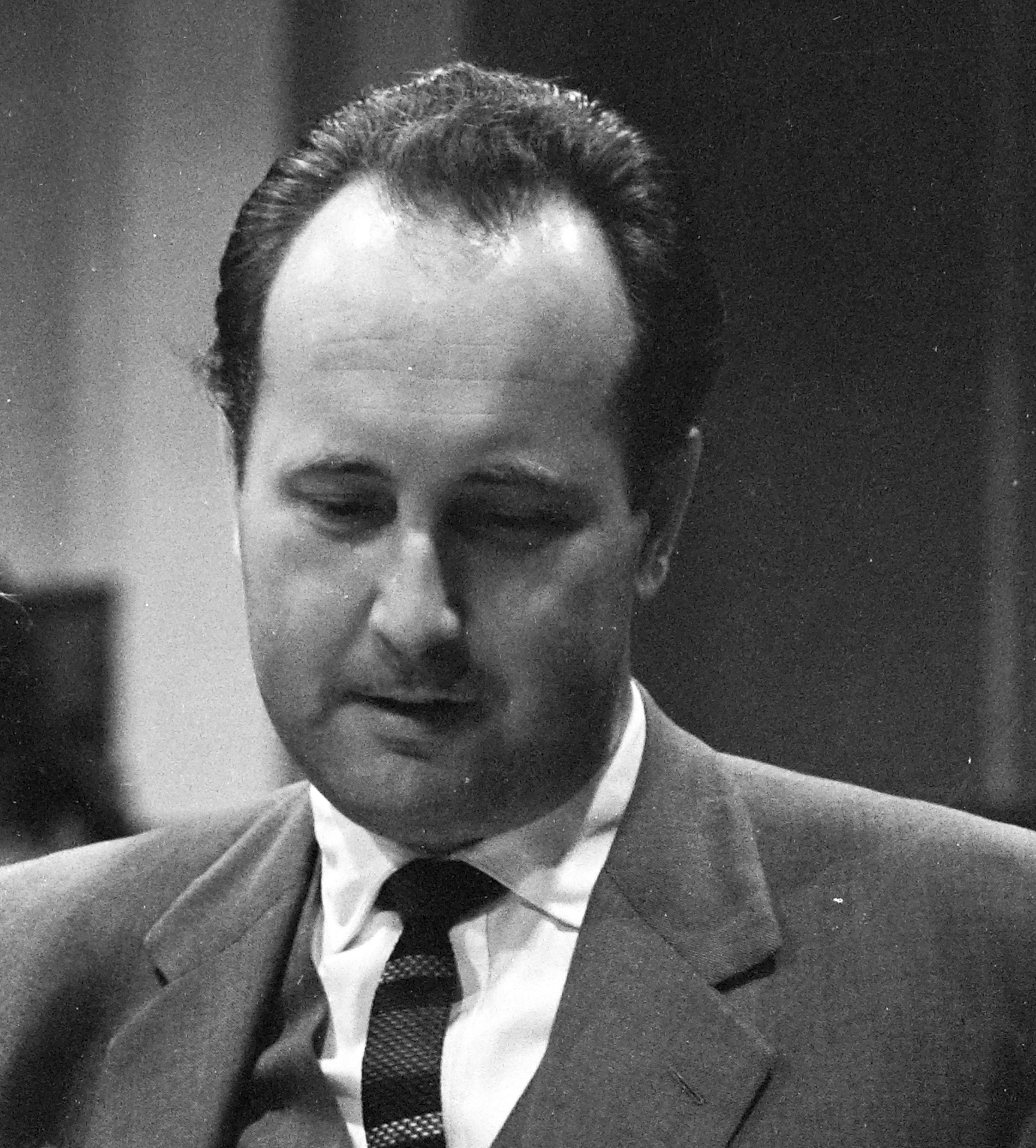
Ilosfalvy in 1959

Róbert Ilosfalvy (June 18, 1927 – January 6, 2009) was a Hungarian operatic tenor; he possessed a voice of lyric grace and dramatic power enabling him to sing a wide range of roles in the Italian, German, and French repertories.

== Life ==
Born in Hódmezővásárhely, Hungary, he began his career as a cantor singing in the Szentharomsag (Holy Trinity) Roman Catholic Church in his hometown, before studying at the Budapest Music Academy with Andor Lendvai. In 1953, after winning a first prize in a vocal competition in Bucharest, he made his operatic debut there. He returned to Hungary and sang at the Budapest Opera, also making guest appearances in Poland, Czechoslovakia, Bulgaria, and Russia.

In 1964, he began a career in West Germany, singing in Stuttgart, Berlin, Hamburg, Cologne, Munich, also making guest appearances at La Monnaie in Brussels, the Royal Opera House in London, the San Francisco Opera, but never at the Metropolitan Opera in New York.

Ilosfalvy was particularly admired in Italian lyric roles such as Duke of Mantua, Alfredo, Rodolfo, Pinkerton, but was also able to tackle successfully more dramatic roles such as Manrico, Alvaro, Cavaradossi, and Dick Johnson. He also won acclaim as Walther von Stolzing, and Don Josė.

He is probably best known for his 1969 recording of Roberto Devereux, opposite Beverly Sills. Also available is a 1976 "pirate" recording of the tenor in La fanciulla del West, with Anja Silja. Both recordings are conducted by Sir Charles Mackerras.

Ilosfalvy died on January 6, 2009, aged 81, his remains are interred in Budapest's Szent Anna Roman Catholic Church.
