= Louis IX (play) =

1819 play

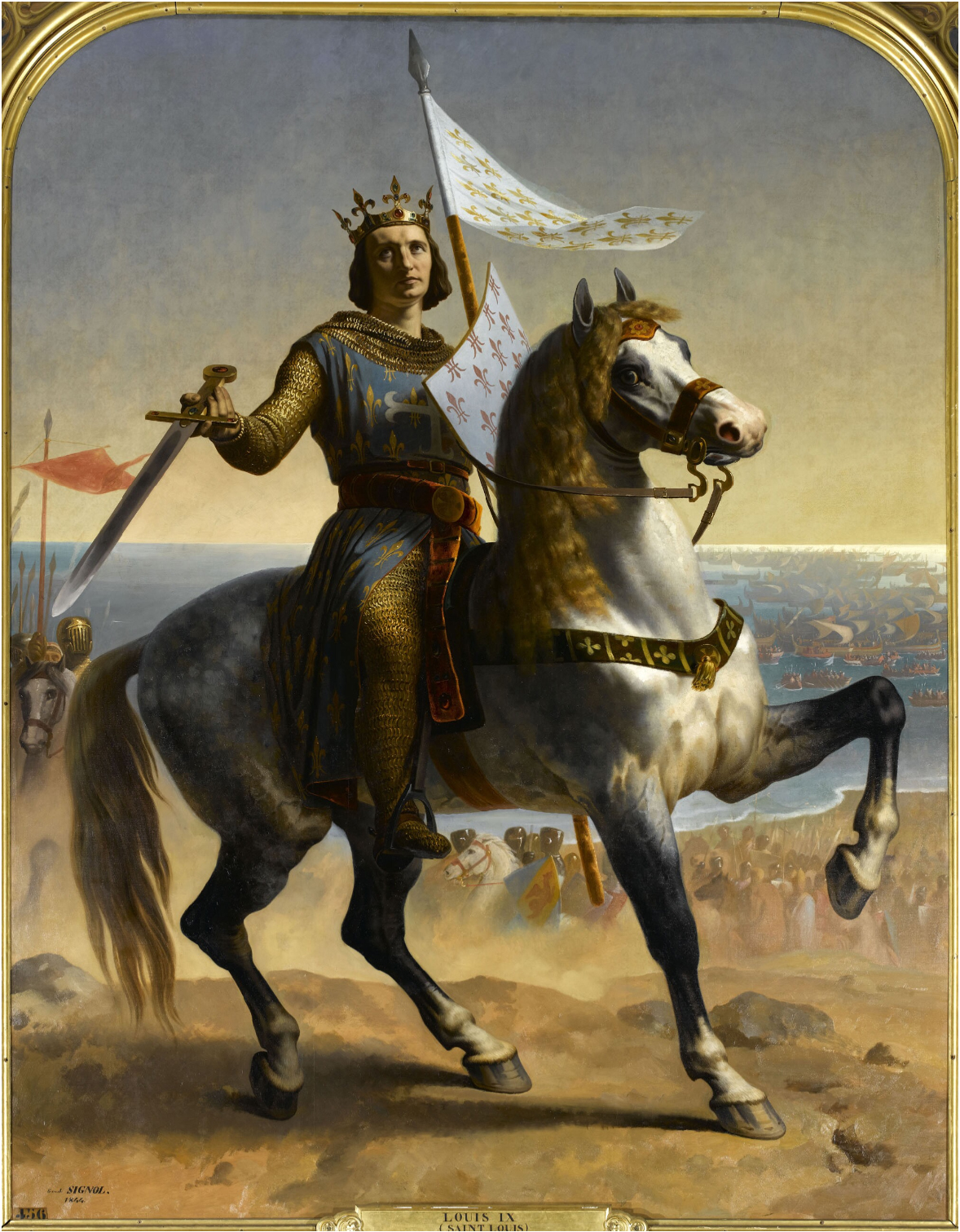
- Louis IX, an 1844 painting by Émile Signol
- Written by: Jacques-François Ancelot
- Genre: Historical tragedy

Premiere
- Date: 14 March 1819
- Place: Comédie-Française, Paris

Louis IX is an 1819 five-act tragedy by the French playwright Jacques-François Ancelot. It is inspired by the life of Louis IX of France, the medieval monarch of France. He took part in the Seventh and Eighth Crusades during the thirteenth century.

The play premiered at the Comédie-Française on 14 March 1819 during the Bourbon Restoration era. It was produced during a boom in portrays of France's royal history, and only a few months after the Coalition's Occupation of France had ended following the Napoleonic Wars. A popular success, Ancelot was awarded a pension from Louis XVIII. It was produced at a time when French drama was on the cusp of transferring from the dominant Neoclassicism to the rising Romanticism.

== Bibliography ==
- Cox, Jeffrey N. In the Shadows of Romance: Romantic Tragic Drama in Germany, England, and France. Ohio University Press, 1987.
- Daniels, Barry. Revolution in the Theatre: French Romantic Theories of Drama. Bloomsbury Academic, 1983.
- Murray, Christopher John. Encyclopedia of the Romantic Era, 1760-1850, Volume 2. Taylor & Francis, 2004.
