= Virginie Ancelot =

French painter, writer and playwright (1792–1875)

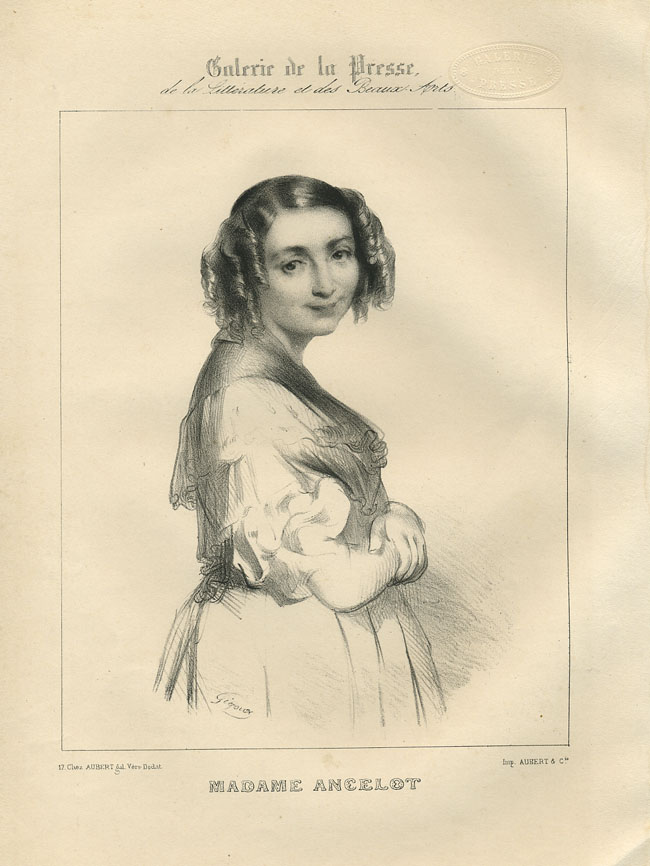
Lithograph of Virginie Ancelot by Marie-Alexandre Alophe

Marguerite-Louise Virginie Chardon Ancelot (French: [viʁʒini ɑ̃səlo]; 1792–1875) was a French painter, writer and playwright. Ancelot was born to a parliamentary family in Dijon, and was married to playwright Jacques-François Ancelot. From 1824 to 1866 Ancelot hosted a literary salon on Paris's rue de Seine.

Her plays were collected in four volumes and published as Theâtre complet in 1848. She published two memoirs: Les Salons de Paris, foyers éteints (1858) and Un salon de Paris 1824-64 (1866). Her most important novels include Georgine (1855), Une route sans issue (1857), and Un nœud de ruban (1858).

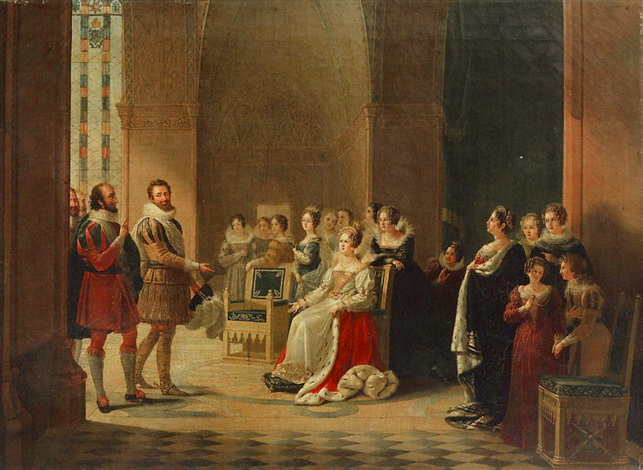
Henri IV et Catherine de Médicis (Salon of 1819)

== Exhibitions ==
- La Veuve du Roi Ban and several portraits, Salon of 1814
- Louis XIV, at the death bed of Jacques II, Salon of 1817

== Collections ==
- Musée Carnavalet, Paris : François Ancelot (1794-1854), auteur dramatique, 1819, oil on canvas

== Bibliography ==
- Henry Gardiner Adams, ed. (1857). "Ancelot, Virginie". A Cyclopaedia of Female Biography: 40–41. Wikidata Q115670001.

== External link ==
- Works by Virginie Ancelot at Gallica
