= Elizabeth of England (play) =

1819 play

- Written by: Jacques-François Ancelot
- Genre: Historical tragedy
- Setting: Tudor England

Premiere
- Date: 4 December 1829
- Place: Comédie-Française, Paris

Elizabeth of England (French: Elisabeth d'Angleterre) is an 1829 historical tragedy by the French playwright Jacques-François Ancelot. It takes place during the reign of Elizabeth I, Queen of England during the Tudor era. A popular success it premiered at the Comédie-Française in December 1829, the year before the July Revolution which led to Ancelot losing his financial backing from the Bourbon Dynasty. Ancelot's play provided the inspiration for the libretto produced by Salvadore Cammarano for the 1837 opera Roberto Devereux by Gaetano Donizetti.

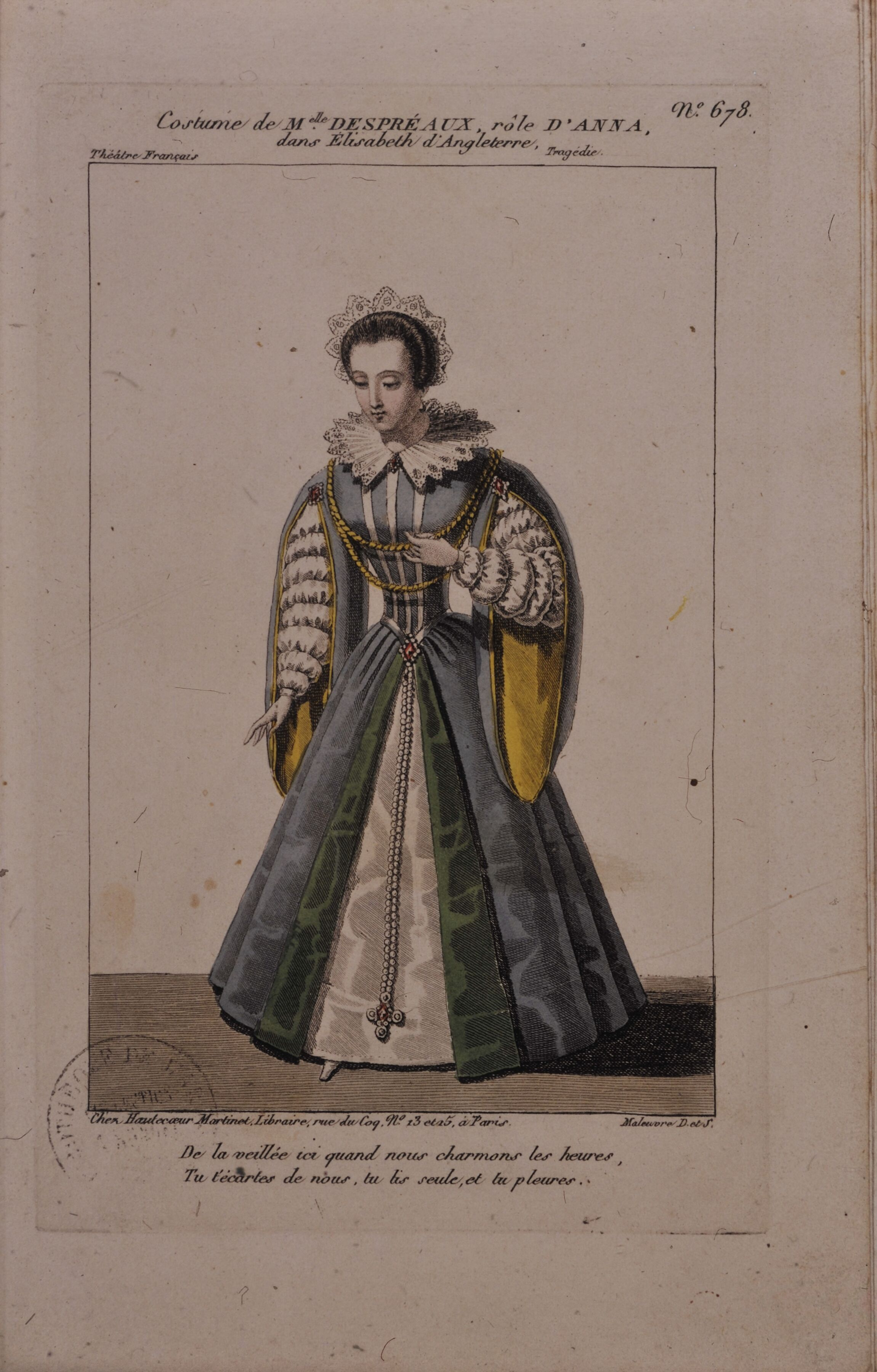
Costume design for the character Anna of Suffolk

== Bibliography ==
- Allegri, Luigi. Le spectaculaire dans les arts de la scène du romantisme à la belle époque. CNRS, 2006.
- Daniels, Barry. Revolution in the Theatre: French Romantic Theories of Drama. Bloomsbury Academic, 1983.
- Hiscock, Andrew. Shakespeare, Violence and Early Modern Europe. Cambridge University Press, 2022.
- Postert, Kirsten. Tragédie historique ou histoire en tragédie?: les sujets d'histoire moderne dans la tragédie française (1550-1715). Narr, 2010.
- Sassoon, Donald. The Culture of the Europeans: From 1800 to the Present. HarperPress, 2006.
