= Jacques-François Ancelot =

French dramatist and litterateur (1794–1854)

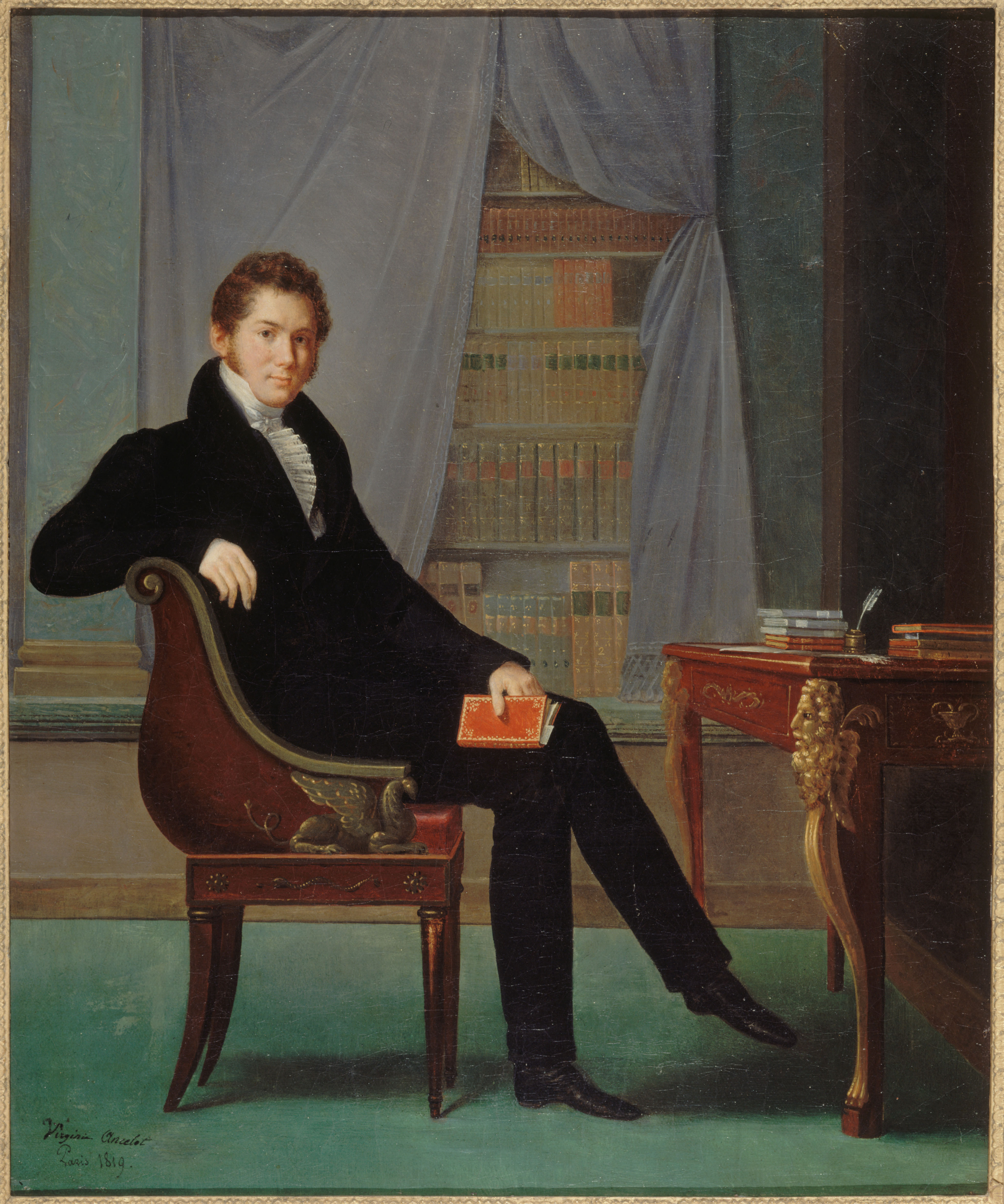
Ancelot portrayed by his wife, Marguerite Ancelot (1819)

Jacques-Arsène-Polycarpe-François Ancelot (French: [ʒak fʁɑ̃swa ɑ̃səlo]; 9 January 1794 – 7 September 1854) was a French dramatist and litterateur.

== Biography ==
Born in Le Havre, Ancelot became a clerk in the admiralty, and retained his position until the Revolution of 1830. In 1816 his play Warwick was accepted by the Théâtre Français, but never produced, and three years later a five-act tragedy, Louis IX, was staged. Three editions of the play were speedily exhausted; it had a run of fifty representations, and brought him a pension of 2000 francs from Louis XVIII. His next work, Le Maire du palais, was played in 1825 with less success; but for it he received the cross of the Légion d'honneur. In 1824 he produced Fiesque, a clever adaptation of Schiller's Fiesco. In 1828 appeared Olga, ou l'orpheline russe, the plot of which had been inspired by a voyage he made to Russia in 1826. About the same period he produced in succession Marie de Brabant (1825), a poem in six cantos; L'Homme du monde (1827), a novel in four volumes, afterwards dramatized with success; and in 1829 a play, Elizabeth of England.

By the Revolution of July 1830 he lost at once his royal pension and his office as librarian at Meudon; and he was chiefly employed during the next ten years in writing vaudevilles and light dramas and comedies. His play Têtes Rondes et Cavaliers, co-authored with Joseph Xavier Saintine, was premiered at the Théâtre du Vaudeville in Paris on 25 September 1833; it also formed the basis for the libretto of the 1835 opera I Puritani, by Vincenzo Bellini. A tragedy, Maria Padilla (1838), gained him admission to the Académie française in 1841. Ancelot was sent by the French government in 1849 to Turin, Florence, Brussels and other capitals, to negotiate on the subject of international copyright; and the treaties which were concluded soon after were the result, in a great measure, of his tact and intelligence.

Ancelot's wife, Marguerite, was a noted painter, writer and also a playwright, and hosted an important literary salon in Paris from 1822 to 1866.
