= St Benet's Hall, Oxford =

Permanent private hall of the University of Oxford

St Benet's Hall
- University of Oxford
- Arms: Per fesse dancetté or and azure, a chief per pale gules and of the second, charged on the dexter with two keys in saltire or and argent, and on the sinister with a cross flory between five martlets of the first.
- Location: 38 St Giles', Oxford
- Coordinates: 51.757952°N 1.260787°W
- Latin name: Aula Privata Sancti Benedicti
- Motto: Ausculta, o fili, praecepta magistri
- Motto in English: Listen, O child, to the master's precepts
- Established: 1897; 129 years ago
- Closed: 2022
- Named after: St Benedict of Nursia
- Website: www.st-benets.ox.ac.uk
- Boat club: St Benet's Hall Boat Club

Map
- Location within Oxford city centre

St Benet's Hall (known colloquially as Benet's) was a permanent private hall (PPH) of the University of Oxford, originally a Roman Catholic religious house of studies. It closed in 2022. The principal building was located at the northern end of St Giles' on its western side, close to the junction with Woodstock Road, Oxford.

== History ==
=== Benedictine antecedents ===
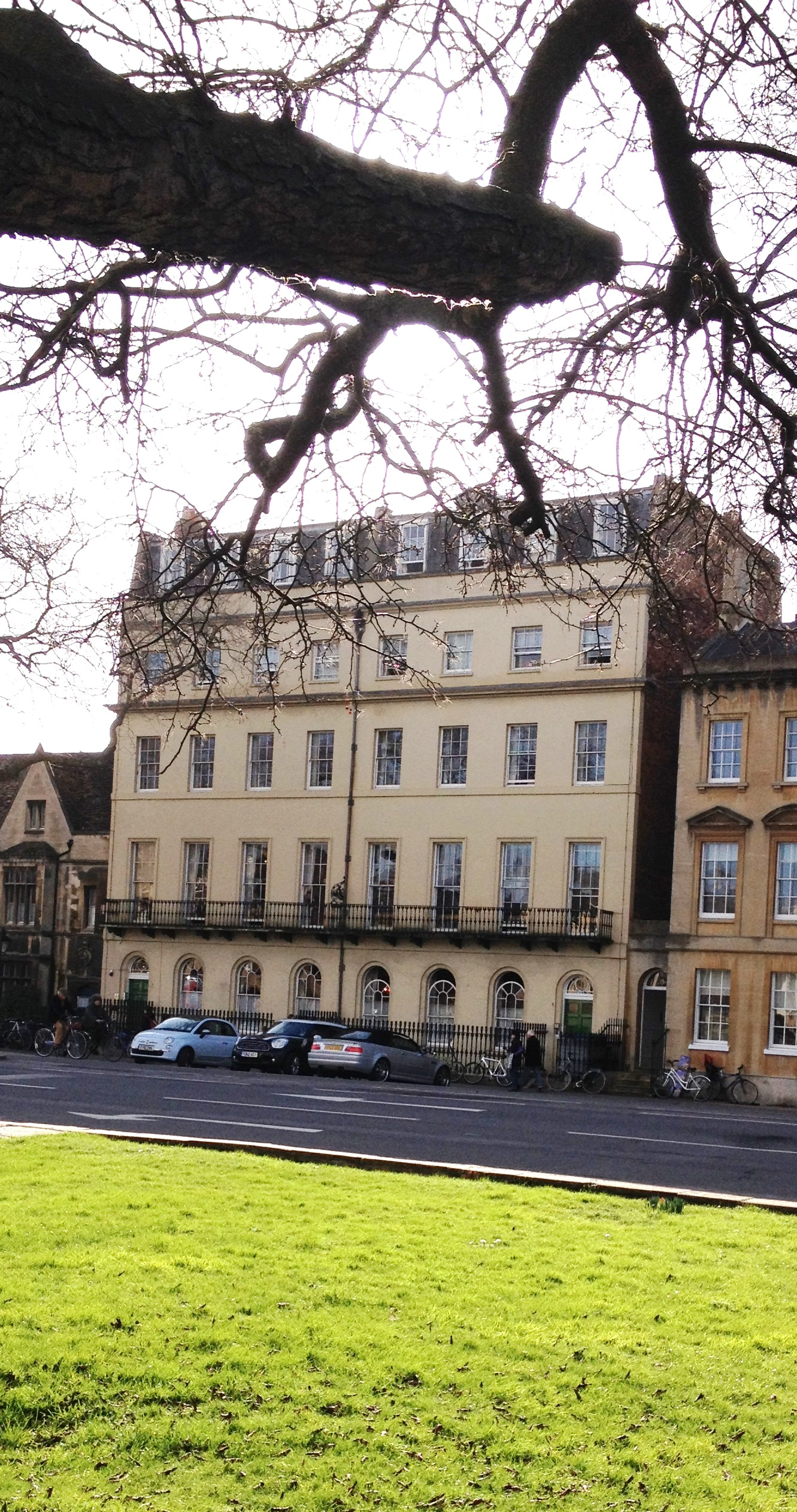
St Benet's Hall

Benedictine monks had studied at Oxford since at least 1281, when Gloucester Abbey founded Gloucester College. The area today known as Gloucester Green was named after this college. In 1291, Durham Abbey founded Durham College, and in 1362, Christ Church Priory in Canterbury founded Canterbury College. All three Benedictine houses of study were closed between 1536 and 1545, during the dissolution of the monasteries under Henry VIII. Gloucester College was eventually re-founded as Worcester College. Durham College was re-founded as Trinity College, but the original college's name is preserved in Trinity's Durham Quadrangle. Canterbury College's property was acquired by Christ Church. Until the establishment of St Benet's Hall in 1897, the Benedictines had been absent from the university for over 350 years.

St Benet's Hall was not a re-foundation of any of the former Benedictine colleges of Oxford. Rather, the hall had a tenuous connection with Westminster Abbey by virtue of its establishment by Ampleforth Abbey. In the 960s or early 970s, Saint Dunstan, assisted by King Edgar, installed a community of Benedictine monks at Westminster. Although the Benedictine priories and abbeys in England were closed during the dissolution of the monasteries, one solitary Benedictine monastery was re-established in Westminster Abbey in 1553 by Mary I as part of her unsuccessful attempt to restore Catholicism in England. After Queen Mary's death, Elizabeth I dissolved the monastery once again. By 1607, only one of the Westminster monks was still alive, Dom Sigebert Buckley (c. 1520–1610). In 1608, Buckley "aggregated" two English exiles who had become monks of the Italian Cassinese Congregation, and thereby allegedly passed on to them the "rights and privileges" of the mediaeval English Benedictine abbeys (to be distinguished from the post-Reformation English Benedictine Congregation). In 1615, these two English monks became part of a community which took up residence in the abandoned collegiate church of Saint Laurent, in the town of Dieulouard, near Nancy in the Lorraine region of north-eastern France. The monks adopted St Lawrence as their patron saint. In 1792, Dieulouard Priory was closed and the monks were expelled from France as part of the hostility against the clergy associated with the French Revolution. They opted to return to England.

At that time a Benedictine monk-priest, Fr Anselm Bolton, was the chaplain to Lady Anne Fairfax at Gilling Castle, North Yorkshire. She was the only daughter of Charles Gregory Fairfax, 9th and last Viscount Fairfax of Emley. She built Ampleforth Lodge for Fr Bolton just before she died in 1792. In 1802, Bolton handed this house over to his brethren from Dieulouard who had been living in England without a permanent home for a decade. The lodge became their new monastery, Ampleforth Priory. In 1803, the monks established Ampleforth College, today an independent Catholic secondary school.

The priory was elevated to the status of an independent abbey in 1899 by Pope Leo XIII in the papal bull Diu quidem est. Ampleforth Abbey renamed the hall of studies as St Benet's Hall in 1918 when it became a permanent private hall of the university.

=== Private hall of studies ===
In October 1897, the priory had established a private hall of studies at Oxford for the purpose of enabling its monks to read for secular degrees at the University of Oxford. The hall was not founded as a theological college but rather as a place where student monks could read for a degree in any secular subject.

Private halls of study at the university took their name from their Master, and so the hall was known successively as Hunter-Blair's Hall and Parker's Hall. It was initially housed at 103 Woodstock Road. This house is still in existence, opposite SS Philip and James Church, and is now a guest-house. The hall was there until 1904, when it moved to the former Grindle's Hall in Beaumont Street, from which it removed in 1922 to the present buildings of 38 and 39 St Giles. The Beaumont Street houses were demolished in 1938 to make space for the Oxford Playhouse theatre.

=== Permanent private hall of the University of Oxford ===
St Benet's became a permanent private hall of the university in 1918, after new university legislation created the status of PPH. It took as its official name Aula Privata Sancti Benedicti: in English, "St Benedict's (or St Benet's) Private Hall". (Benet is a mediaeval English variant of the name Benedict.) It was named after St Benedict of Nursia (c. 480–547), the founder of the Benedictine order, father of western monasticism and a patron saint of Europe and of students.

The character of the hall changed over the years, acquiring fellows in imitation of the university's constituent colleges. However, as a PPH of the university, the hall's fellows did not constitute its governing body. Rather, they shared with the master the day-to-day running of the hall, and elected one of their number to serve as a trustee of the St Benet's Trust when that charity was founded in 2012. Before then, the hall was a private possession of Ampleforth Abbey. The hall matriculated students to be members of the university, so those of its student body who matriculated were full members of the university in all ways, and were able to supplicate for degrees on the successful completion of their studies. For most of its members the only noticeable difference made by the hall's legal status is that it was very much smaller than any of the Oxford constituent colleges.

With the decline of monastic vocations beginning in the 1960s, more and more Roman Catholic laymen were admitted - especially under Master James Forbes OSB, including some Old Amplefordians. Under Master Philip Holdsworth OSB (1979–1989), the hall again emphasised a monastic ethos and also became more theological in character, with many monks from the English Benedictine Congregation and other Benedictine Congregations studying theology at Blackfriars Hall. Master Henry Wansbrough (1990–2004) started again to admit laymen, thus creating a mixed focus on theology, philosophy and the humanities.

There was never a policy that lay members of the Hall, both undergraduates and postgraduates, should be Catholics - and in the 21st century most were not. However, all members were asked to be supportive of the monks' life and values.

A review of the PPHs conducted by the university in 2007 concluded that St Benet's had a "good sense of its place within the collegiate University" and drew attention to the "commitment and care" of the hall's academic staff. In May 2013 the Student Barometer survey results showed that St Benet's Hall had the highest overall student satisfaction score out of the 44 constituent colleges and permanent private halls of the university.

=== Sexual abuse scandal ===
In 1996 Bernard Green OSB (1953-2013), a monk of Ampleforth Abbey, was convicted of sexually abusing a 14-year old schoolboy at the monastery's school, Ampleforth College, in the previous year. He was put on probation and prohibited from teaching. Despite this, the abbey sent him to reside and teach at St Benet's Hall in 2000 without, allegedly, informing the hall of his conviction. He was issued with a "final" letter of warning by the university in 2005, after being accused of sexually harassing a 19-year-old undergraduate member of the hall. This letter was supposedly unknown to the hall until 2006, but Green was subsequently kept in residence until 2012 when he was finally dismissed. The scandal came to the notice of the national media.

=== Final decade ===
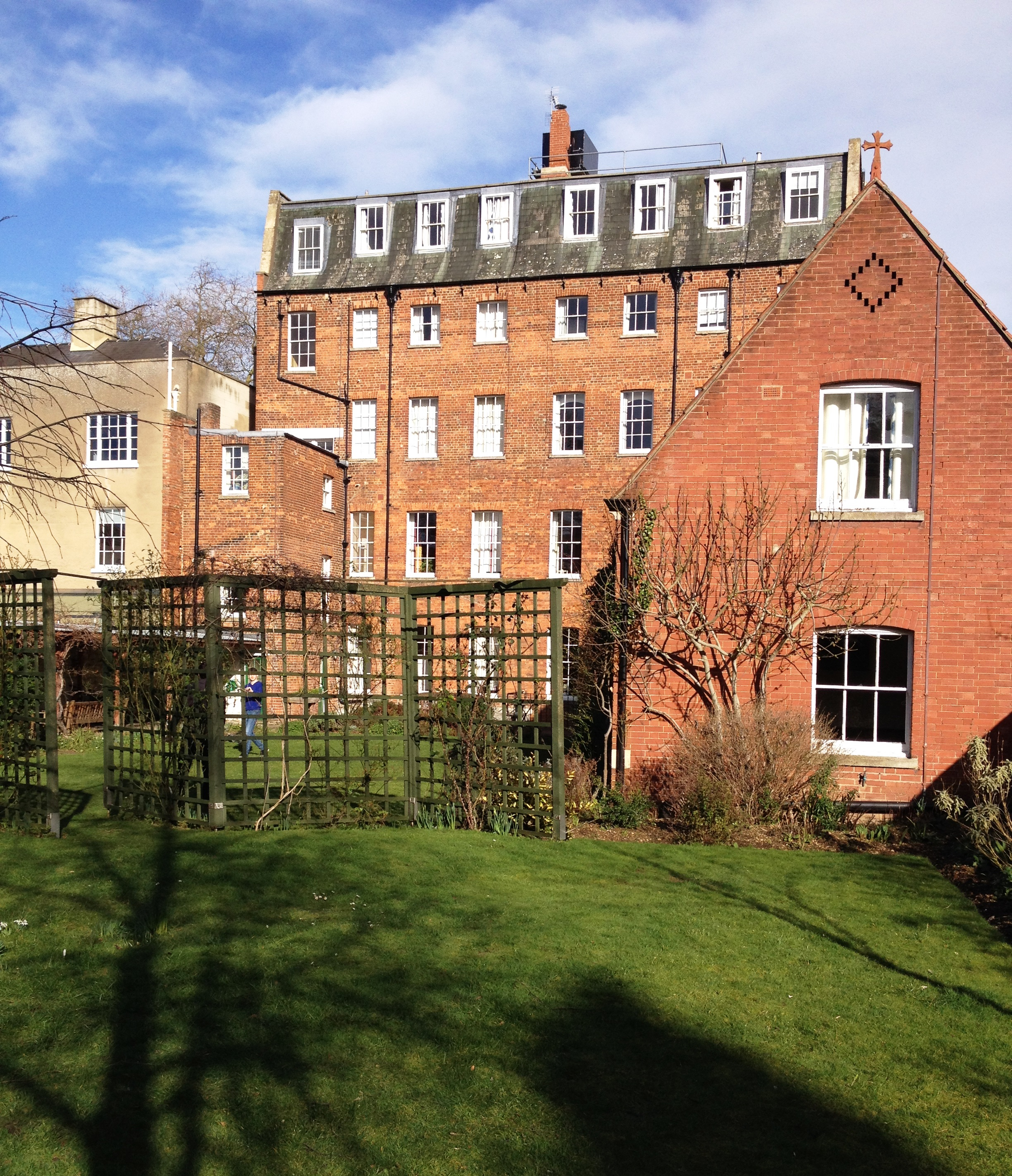
St Benet's Hall Garden

Until 2012, the Master of the hall was always a Benedictine monk from Ampleforth. On 1 September of that year, Werner Jeanrond, formerly holder of the 1640 Chair of Divinity at the University of Glasgow, became the new Master. He was the first Catholic layman ever to run the hall. Jeanrond became a full member of the Faculty of Theology and Religion at Oxford and was engaged in both teaching and research, as well as serving as head of house.

Until 2016, St Benet's was the last constituent body of the University of Oxford admitting only men. It was also the last single-sex college or hall in the university after St Hilda's College, the last all-women's college in Oxford, admitted men in 2008. In November 2013, under Professor Jeanrond, the hall announced its intention to admit women graduate students within one year and women undergraduates as soon as additional housing facilities were obtained. Women were admitted as graduate students in October 2014, and as undergraduates in October 2016. Thus 2016 was the year when all constituent colleges and halls of the university became fully coeducational. (The University of Cambridge retains two constituent colleges for female students only.)

To allow for the admission of undergraduate women, in October 2015 St Benet's Hall acquired a hall of residence owned by the Sisters of the Sacred Heart, at 11 Norham Gardens, next to University Parks and near Lady Margaret Hall. So the hall became a co-educational academic community, latterly consisting of 84 undergraduate students and 48 graduate students of all faiths and none.

The degree subjects to which the last undergraduate students were admitted by St Benet's were: Theology, Philosophy and Theology, Theology and Oriental Studies, History, History and Politics, History and Economics, Philosophy, Politics and Economics (PPE), Classics, Classics with Oriental Studies, Oriental Studies (Egyptology; Egyptology and Ancient Near Eastern Studies, Islamic Studies, Hebrew Studies, and Jewish Studies), Oriental Studies with Classics, and Human Science. The hall admitted graduate students from the same subjects as undergraduates as well as those who studied at the Blavatnik School of Government, the Institute of Cognitive and Evolutionary Anthropology, and the Saïd Business School.

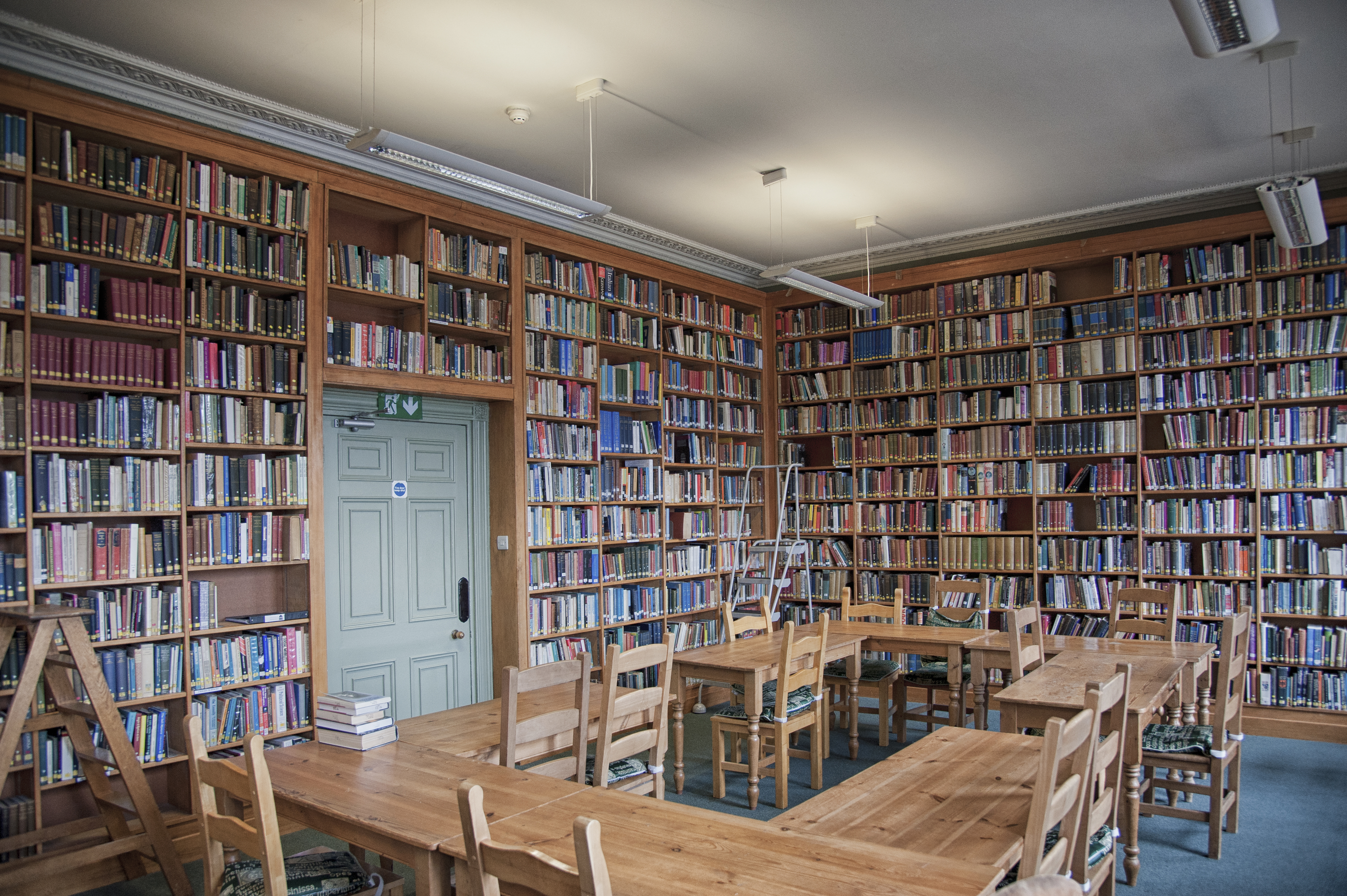
Hall Library

=== Closure ===
In September 2021, it was announced that the John and Daria Barry Foundation, a philanthropic trust run by the venture capitalist John F. Barry III, was making a £40 million rescue offer to enable the hall to become completely independent of Ampleforth Abbey. This was on condition that the buildings would be purchased from the Ampleforth Abbey Trust for £15 million (less than their market value), that the St Benet's Trust was to be made completely separate from the abbey and that the chair was to be the prominent conservative philosopher and academic Robert P. George of Princeton University. Barry himself was on record as describing the venture as a Hail Mary pass, indicating limited expectations of success.

However, in December of that year, the university stated that without the abbey's continued financial support, "it cannot be confident that the hall can support a new undergraduate cohort for the full duration of their studies". The major issues were that the hall's endowments were inadequate, the two buildings were owned by Ampleforth Abbey and operational deficits were being covered by subsidies from the abbey.

So, the university announced that it would temporarily cease to accept undergraduate matriculations from the hall, owing to these serious financial issues. May 2022 was the deadline for deciding this point as regards the academic year 2022–3.

In that month it was made public that the University Council had decided not to renew the hall's PPH licence, which implied that the hall would close at the end of the 2022 academic year. The university had decided that the new arrangements proposed by the Barry Foundation would not be financially viable and questioned the implications of the new board, and so they were rejected.

In June 2022 it was finally announced that the buildings would be vacated by October 2022, and that the university was seeking alternative colleges to which existing students would transfer. The buildings were subsequently purchased by St Hilda's College. The hall was formally closed on 30 September 2022. The last member of staff vacated the St Giles house on 7 October. The wine cellar of 1,100 bottles was donated to Blackfriars Hall. Students relocated individually to other colleges and halls of the university to continue their studies. The St Benet's Hall Boat Club continues to operate.

== St Benet's Hall Association ==
The St Benet’s Hall Association was a not-for-profit organisation founded in 2007 by Benet’s alumni. Its purpose was to promote a close relationship amongst those who studied, lived or taught at St Benet’s Hall.

Following the dissolution of the Hall, the role of the Association was assumed by the Regent's Park College Development Office, who established "St Benet's at Regent's" to be a home for St Benet's alumni in Oxford. At the last Regent's Formal Hall of Trinity Term 2024, a new Regent’s-St Benet’s shield was unveiled; hung above the entrance to Helwys Hall, the plaque symbolises the joining of the two communities.

== Former Buildings ==
=== 38 and 39 St Giles ===
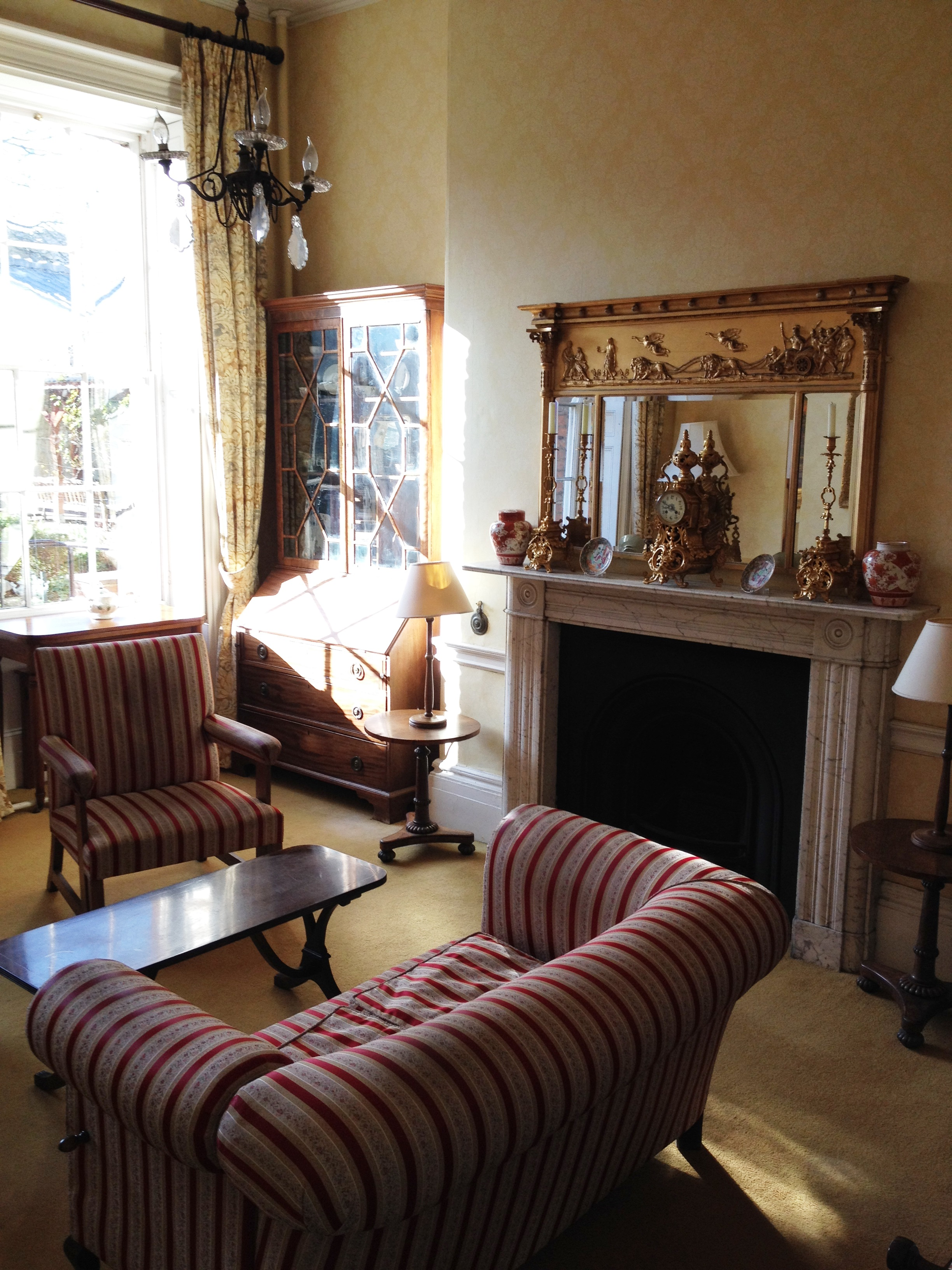
Yellow Room, St Benet's Hall

The hall occupied 38-39 St Giles from 1923 to 2022. This is a rather plain late Regency style edifice of four storeys, with a further attic storey and cellars. The cellar area ensured that the original set of wrought iron railings have survived, as has a wrought iron balcony across the façade at the second storey. The first storey has six round-headed windows in recessed frames, flanked by a pair of matching doors with fanlights. The second storey has eight tall rectangular windows, complemented by shorter ones for the third storey and square ones for the fourth. The third and fourth storeys are separated by a moulded string course which is the only decorative feature of the façade. The slate mansard roof has attic windows inserted.

The dining hall took up most of the ground floor, and the common room and library were above that. The chapel is a red brick garden annexe in a vaguely Gothic style.

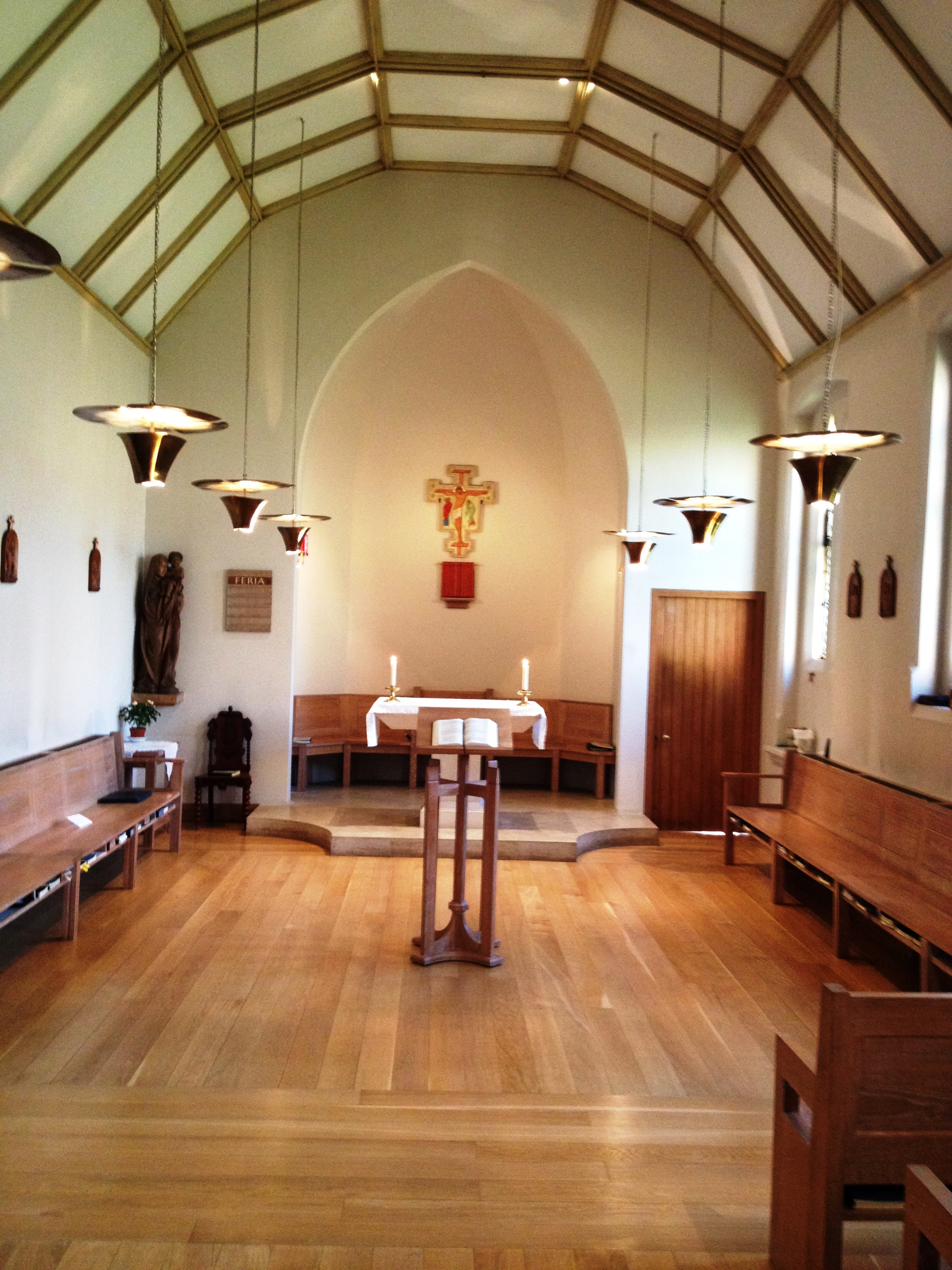
Hall chapel

The original building dates from 1830, and was constructed as two separate houses (38 and 39). The site was previously part of a coster's (i.e., fruit seller's) yard and stable. In the nineteenth century, the two houses served as private homes for several Anglican clergy connected to the university, and to a number of widows of independent means.

The northern house (38 St Giles) was, in 1841, occupied as the private dwelling of the Rev. Philip Bliss, Registrar of the University of Oxford and later principal of St Mary's Hall. Bliss lived there with his wife and four servants. A decade later, it was the home of the university's public orator and vice principal and later principal of Magdalen Hall, the Rev. Richard Michell. In 1874, Michell became first principal of the refounded Hertford College. After a two-year period as the Oxford High School (1879–1881), it became a private home once more, belonging briefly to Charlotte Cotton, widow of the Rev. Richard Lynch Cotton, provost of Worcester College (1881–1882). It then belonged to the Rev. S. J. Hulme, chaplain of Wadham College (1884–1887). In 1889, it served briefly as the Oxford Eye Hospital which is today part of the John Radcliffe Hospital. In 1891, it was acquired by Madame de Leobardy and opened as St Ursula's Convent, a boarding and day school for Roman Catholic girls.

The southern house (39 St Giles) was the private home of Letitia Pett (1841–1846) and Maria Brown (1852–1861), both widows. It was then acquired by the Rev.Richard Greswell, tutor in theology at Worcester College, and his family (1861–1881). After his death in 1881, his widow Joanna Greswell lived in the house until 1894. The British military historian Sir Charles William Chadwick Oman, a fellow of All Souls College and the Chichele Professor of Modern History, acquired the house in 1898 and lived there until 1908. In 1909, it too was purchased by Madame de Leobardy and became an extension of the convent school next door. The chapel in the garden is evidence of this.

St Ursula's Convent School closed in 1922. Ampleforth Abbey acquired both buildings in 1923, and combined the two into one residence. It was the sole building of St Benet's Hall until 2015.

=== 11 Norham Gardens ===
A large house in Norham Gardens was acquired in 2015, as part of the policy of expansion begun in 2012.

The original Victorian Gothic villa was built in 1860 and designed by William Wilkinson, who was also responsible for the Randolph Hotel, Oxford. Norham Gardens is in an area originally known as Norham Manor and was owned by St John's College. Past occupants of 11 Norham Gardens include Henry Balfour, the first curator of the Pitt Rivers Museum, and Francis Llewellyn Griffith, the first professor of Egyptology at Oxford. Griffith's archaeological finds form the backbone of the Egyptian collections at the Ashmolean Museum. In 1932 the Society of the Sacred Heart, a Roman Catholic order of nuns, purchased the villa. The purpose of this acquisition was to provide accommodation for women students at Oxford registered at the Society of Oxford Home-Students which later became St Anne's College. In 1951, a new wing was added as a student hostel providing 21 rooms. These rooms also accommodated women at St Anne's, which became a constituent college of the university in 1952. The association with St Anne's lessened over time and women students (mostly undergraduates) from across the university lived in the hostel, whilst the Sisters lived in the villa. By the 1990s the student population in the hostel became entirely postgraduate, housing both men and women of any faith or none. In spring 2015, the Sacred Heart Sisters decided to sell the house and hostel complex to St Benet's Hall to enable the latter to become fully co-educational by Michaelmas Term 2016.

== Administration ==
The governing body of the hall comprised the trustees of a charity known as the St Benet's Trust, created in 2012 with the trust's chair being ex officio the Abbot of Ampleforth Abbey. However, the assets of this Trust were wholly owned by the Ampleforth Abbey Trust. In 2016, Abbot Cuthbert Madden resigned after allegations of sexual abuse and was replaced as chair by a lay fellow.

Unlike the university's colleges and other PPHs, St Benet's had a joint common room of which all at the hall were members. The JCR had its own committee, and was responsible for running the St Benet's bar and gym facilities.

== Refectory ==
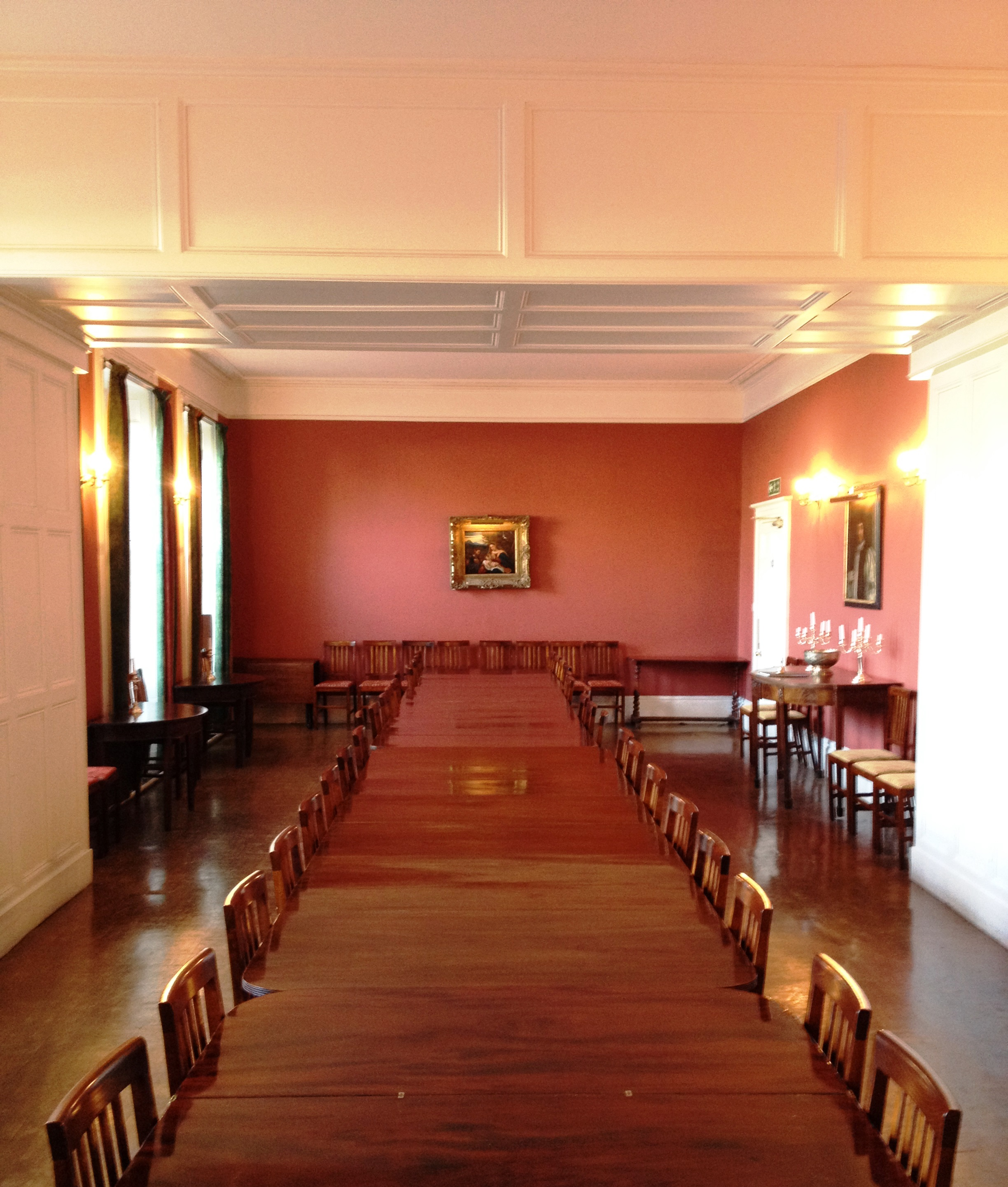
Refectory

Again unlike the university's constituent colleges, the hall did not have a high table but one common dining table shared by all members. Members of the hall were entitled to invite guests to all meals, with the result that fellows, lecturers, monks, students, and their guests mixed freely. The dining hall was known as the refectory, in accordance with monastic tradition.

The following grace was said in Latin before every formal Hall meal, which at St Benet's was latterly held on Tuesday, Thursday and Sunday. It was recited by the Master or a person he designated. In addition, after grace, an undergraduate student would read a short passage from the Rule of St Benedict in English.

Gratiarum actio ante cibum
Benedic Domine,
nos et haec tua dona
quae de tua largitate sumus sumpturi,
per Christum Dominum nostrum. Amen

Grace before the meal
Bless us, O Lord,
and these thy gifts
which we are about to receive from thy bounty,
through Christ our Lord. Amen.

Grace after the meal was said in Latin after formal hall by the chaplain in the following form:

Gratiarum actio post cibum
Agimus tibi gratias,
omnipotens Deus,
pro universis beneficiis tuis,
qui vivis et regnas in saecula saeculorum. Amen.

Grace after the meal
We give thee thanks,
O almighty God,
for all thy benefits,
who livest and reignest for ever and ever. Amen.

== Sport ==
Despite the small size of the hall, the St Benet's Hall Boat Club raced an eight boat on the River Thames for many years. In recent years, it has had a good record of winning 'blades', the trophy awarded for 'bumping' (rowing past teams ranked above) every day in the Torpids and Summer Eights bumps races. The Boat Club's M1 won blades most recently in 2019. Although the Hall is closed, the St Benet's Hall Boat Club still exists.

The hall also had its own netball, rugby sevens, and field hockey teams, as well as a football team joint with Regent's Park College. The Benet's rugby sevens team is the back-to-back 2018 and 2019 Oxford University rugby sevens champion.

== Coat of arms ==
Coat of arms of Ampleforth Abbey

St Benet's Hall used the same coat of arms as Ampleforth Abbey and Ampleforth College but, like the college, without the abbot's crozier and galero (ecclesiastical hat with tassels). The arms were granted to the abbey by the English College of Arms in 1922. The abbey made the application to the College of Arms to regularise its armorial position as the alleged lineal descendant of Westminster Abbey. The purpose of this move was to conform to proper authority and thus not be open to the charge of lack of consideration for post-Reformation bodies already bearing variants of the Westminster arms in their own line of heraldic descent.

The Pre-Reformation City of Westminster sometimes used a red shield with two keys in saltire to symbolise Saint Peter to whom its Abbey Church was dedicated. In addition, Westminster also used a blue shield with a gold “cross flory” between five gold martlets (heraldic birds). This forms the attributed arms of St Edward the Confessor (reign 1042–1066), the last Anglo-Saxon king of England, who is regarded as the principal patron and founder of Westminster Abbey. Both these arms appear in the chief (top portion) of the shield. The base (lower portion) of the shield is gold and blue divided “dancetté” (by a zigzag line). This represents the arms of the pre-Reformation Abbots of Westminster who would place their personal coat of arms in the top portion (chief) of the shield. The last Benedictine Abbot of Westminster to use this coat of arms was John Feckenham (c. 1515–1584) who was removed from office by Elizabeth I in 1560 at the final suppression of the abbey. The abbey church then became known as the Collegiate Church of St Peter, Westminster, which remains its official name to this day.

The shield of Ampleforth Abbey, Ampleforth College, and St Benet's Hall was thus a combination of three shields – the first representing St Peter (top left), the second representing St Edward the Confessor (top right), and the bottom representing the pre-Reformation Benedictine Abbots of Westminster. The heraldic blazon of the arms is as follows: Per fesse dancetté Or and Azure a chief per pale Gules and of the second charged on the dexter with two keys in saltire Or and Argent and on the sinister with a Cross Flory between five martlets of the first. Although not official, the motto associated with the hall is Ausculta, O fili, praecepta magistri which translates as "Listen, O [my] son, to the precepts of [thy] master." This is taken from the Latin original of the opening line of the prologue to the Rule of St. Benedict.

== People associated with St Benet's ==
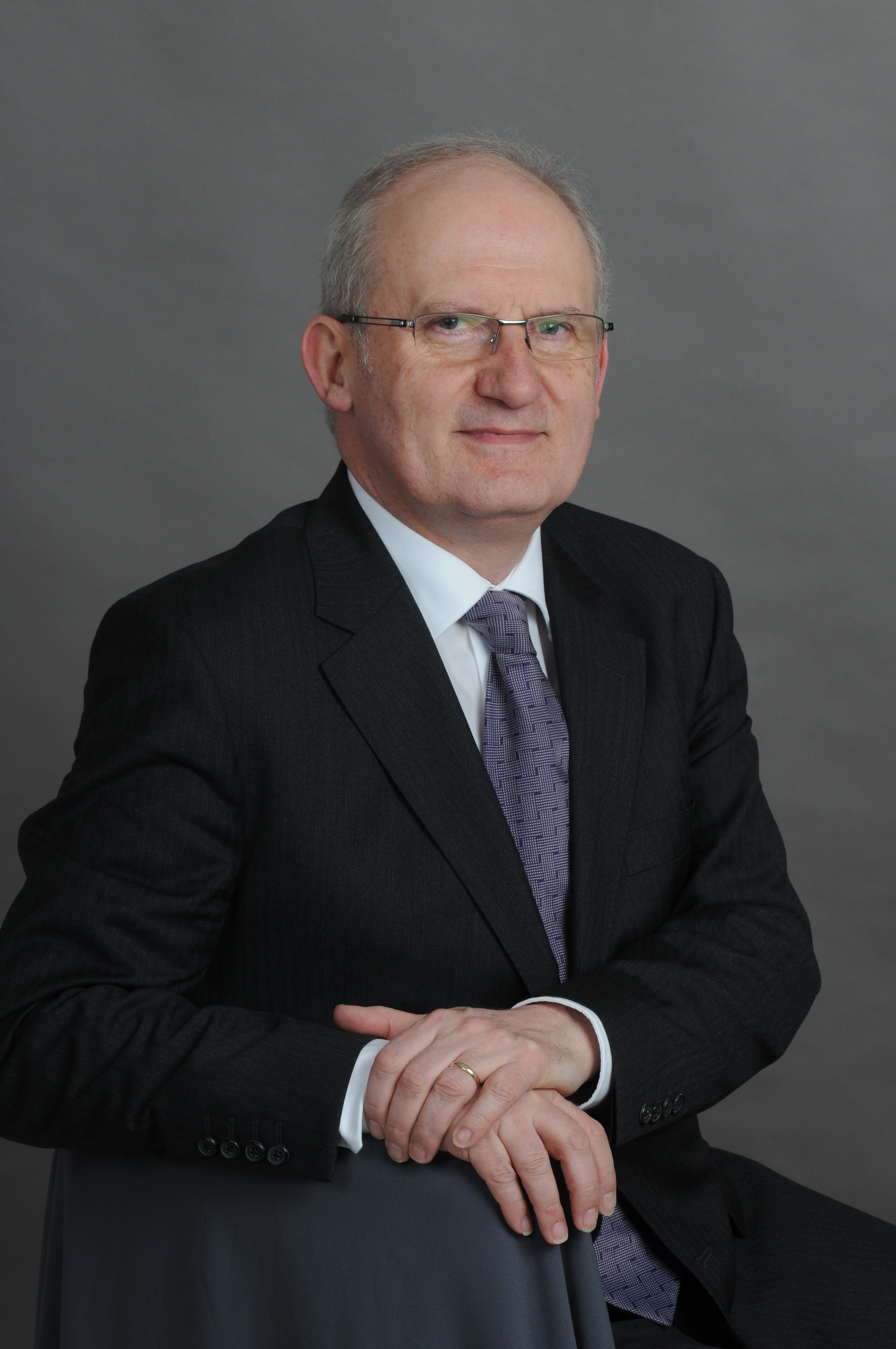
Professor Werner Jeanrond

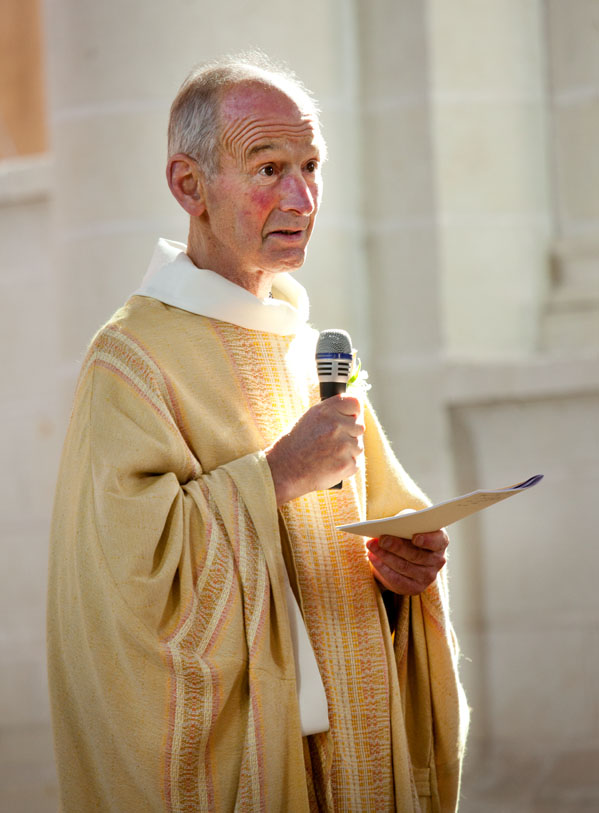
Very Revd Dom Henry Wansbrough

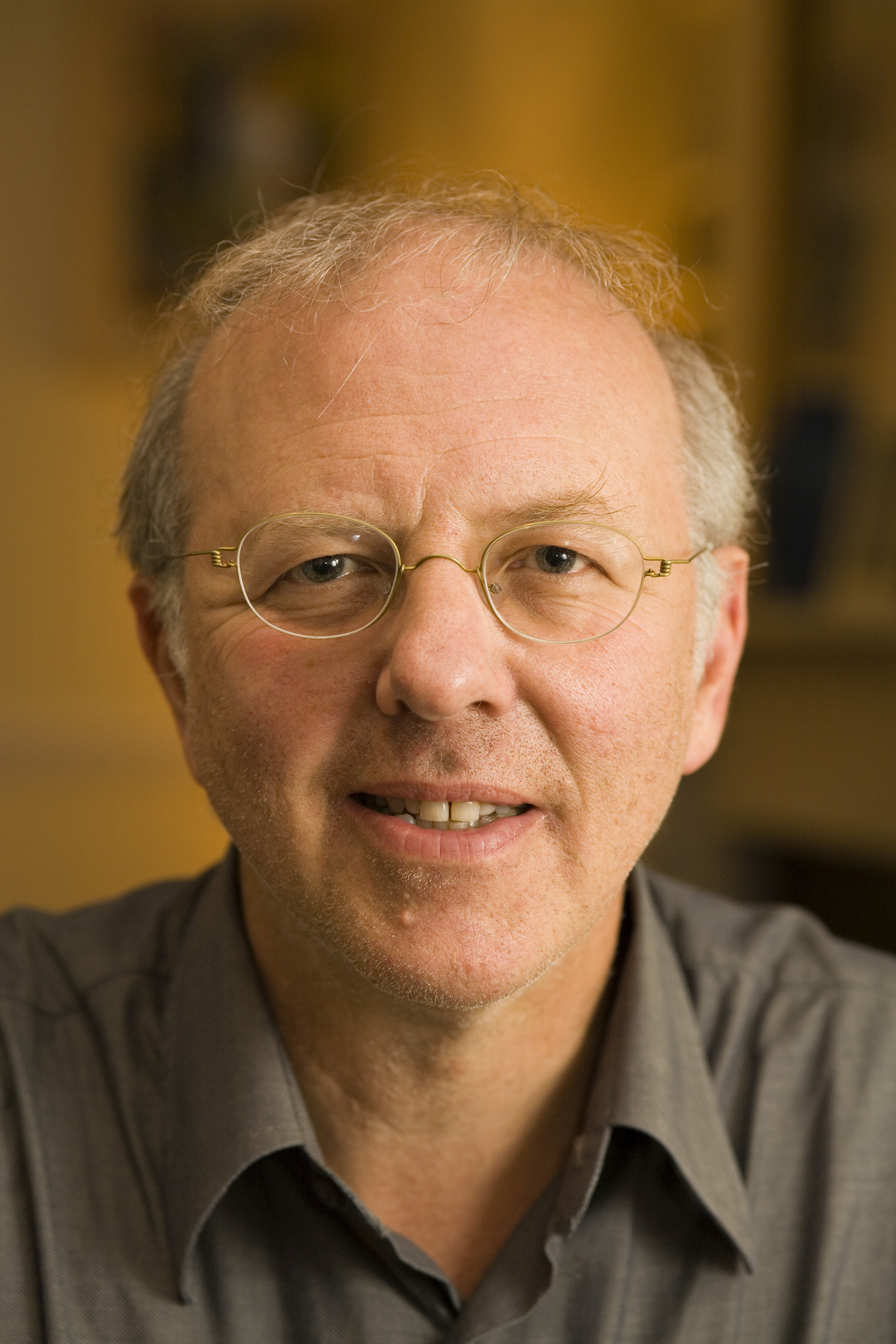
Dr Brian Klug

=== Masters ===
St Benet's had twelve masters following its establishment in 1897:

- Oswald Hunter Blair OSB (1898–1909)
- Anselm Parker OSB (1909–1920)
- Justin McCann OSB (1920–1947)
- Gerard Sitwell OSB (1947–1964)
- James Forbes OSB (1964–1979)
- Philip Holdsworth OSB (1979–1989)
- Fabian Cowper OSB (1989–1990)
- Henry Wansbrough OSB (1990–2004); Editor of the New Jerusalem Bible
- Leo Chamberlain OSB (2004–2007)
- Felix Stephens OSB (2007–2012)
- Werner Jeanrond (2012–2018)
- Richard Cooper (2018–2022)

=== Fellows ===
Notable fellows of the hall include:

- Brian Klug, senior research fellow in Philosophy (2000–2022)
- Susan Doran, fellow in history (2007–2022)
- Harry Sidebottom, fellow and director of studies in ancient history (2008–2014)

=== Honorary fellows ===
- Leo Chamberlain; Master of St Benet's Hall 2004–2007; Titular Cathedral Prior of Gloucester
- Peter Hennessy, Baron Hennessy of Nympsfield; Attlee Professor of Contemporary British History, Queen Mary, University of London
- Werner Jeanrond; Master of St Benet's Hall 2012–2018; Professor of Systematic Theology (Dogmatics), University of Oslo
- Henry Mayr-Harting; emeritus Regius Professor of Ecclesiastical History, University of Oxford
- Peter Sutherland; previously Attorney General of Ireland. He also held office as non-executive chairman of Goldman Sachs International, chairman of the London School of Economics, and Consultor of the Extraordinary Section of the Administration of the Patrimony of the Apostolic See.
- Henry Wansbrough; Master of St Benet's Hall 1990–2004; Titular Cathedral Prior of Norwich 2004–2009; Titular Cathedral Prior of Durham

=== Notable alumni ===
- John Balme, American conductor, opera manager, and pianist
- David Blair, chief foreign correspondent for the Daily Telegraph
- Bishop Donald Joseph Bolen, Roman Catholic Bishop of Saskatoon
- Damian Collins, Member of Parliament (MP) for Folkestone and Hythe
- John Cornwell, author, and academic at Jesus College, Cambridge
- Lumumba Stanislaus-Kaw Di-Aping, Sudanese diplomat
- Simon Halliday, England rugby international
- Cardinal Basil Hume (1923–1999), Abbot of Ampleforth (1963–1976) and Archbishop of Westminster (1976–1999)
- Olegario González de Cardedal, chair of theology, Pontifical University of Salamanca, Spain
- Martin Jennings, sculptor
- Sir Anthony Kenny, analytical philosopher, and former Master of Balliol College, Oxford
- General Jacko Page, lieutenant general, 6th Infantry Division, British Army
- Columba Stewart, American Benedictine monk, scholar, executive director of the Hill Museum & Manuscript Library in Collegeville, Minnesota

== See also ==
- English Benedictine Congregation
- Greyfriars, Oxford
