= The Saint John's Bible =

Illuminated Bible commissioned in 1998

- Saint John's University, Collegeville, Minnesota
- Type: Illuminated manuscript
- Date: Completed in 2011
- Language: English
- Scribe(s): Donald Jackson and others
- Illuminated by: Thomas Ingmire and others
- Patron: Benedictine monks of Saint John's University
- Material: Quill on vellum
- Size: 2 ft x 3 ft
- Illumination: 160

The Saint John's Bible is the first completely handwritten and illuminated Bible to be commissioned by a Benedictine abbey since the invention of the printing press. The project was headed by Donald Jackson, and work on the manuscript took place in both Wales and Minnesota, United States. Work on the 1,100 page Bible began in 1998 when it was commissioned by the Benedictine monks at Saint John's University, and was completely finished in December 2011 at a total cost of over $8 million. The Saint John's Bible is divided into seven volumes and is two feet tall by three feet wide when open. The book is written on vellum by quill, containing 160 illuminations across its seven volumes, and uses the New Revised Standard Version Catholic Edition (NRSV-CE) of the Bible. A copy of The Saint John's Bible has been presented to the Pope at the Vatican in several volumes, with the final volume presented on April 17, 2015.

== Origin ==
Beginning in 1970, master calligrapher Donald Jackson—the official scribe in the Crown Office at the House of Lords of the United Kingdom—expressed in media interviews his lifelong desire to create a completely handwritten illuminated Bible. In 1995 Jackson attended a Saint John's University-sponsored calligraphy presentation at the Newberry Library in Chicago, following which he discussed the possibility of a handwritten Bible with Father Eric Hollas, OSB, the former executive director of the Hill Museum & Manuscript Library at Saint John's University in Collegeville, Minnesota.

Between 1996 and 1997, Saint John's University explored the feasibility of the Bible project, with Jackson creating first samples and theologians developing the initial illumination schema. The Saint John's Bible was officially commissioned in 1998 by the Benedictine Monks at Saint John's University, and external funding opportunities were launched. The project was introduced to the public in 1999 and production was completed in 2011—with the final word penned in May 2011 and touch-up work completed by December 2011—taking 23 artists and calligraphers over 11 years to complete. The headquarters for the project is located at Saint John's University, and Donald Jackson's scriptorium is located in Monmouth, Wales.

=== Mission ===
Saint John's states that the purpose of The Saint John's Bible is the following: "At the onset of a new millennium, Saint John's University and the monks of Saint John's Abbey sought to ignite the spiritual imagination of people throughout the world by commissioning a work of art that illuminates the world today." Donald Jackson and his team also outlined during the production of the Bible six core values for its readers to apply to their lives: igniting spiritual imagination, glorifying God's word, reviving tradition, discovering history through manuscript exploration, fostering the arts, and giving a voice to the underprivileged.

=== Techniques ===
The creators of The Saint John's Bible used a mixture of modern technology (computers used to plan the layout of the Bible and line-breaks for the text) and older techniques used in the creation of ancient illuminated manuscripts (handwritten with turkey, goose, and swan quills on calf-skin vellum; gold and platinum leaf and hand-ground pigments; Chinese stick ink). The official website for The Saint John's Bible states the following regarding the techniques used in the creation of the book:

The unique aspect of the Bible is that it is a Bible for our time. It is a combination of ancient methods and materials with themes, images and technology of the 21st century and beyond. The Saint John's Bible represents humankind's achievements over the past 500 years. It is a contemporary blending of religious imagery from various Eastern and Western traditions, as befits our modern understanding of the global village. This Bible reflects Saint John's commitment to Scripture and to the Book Arts, as well as to spiritual, artistic, educational and scholarly programming.

The Saint John's Bible uses the New Revised Standard Version Catholic Edition (NRSV-CE) of the Bible. Donald Jackson, the primary calligrapher, created a unique script specifically for the project.

==== Committee on Illumination and Text ====
During production, a team of scholars and theologians gathered weekly to develop the theological content behind the illuminations. This included not only developing the schema for the illuminations (i.e., which passages would be illuminated, how the illuminations would be incorporated into the text), but also identifying underlying themes and elements for the artists to incorporate. The meetings of the Committee on Illuminations and Text took place in Collegeville, Minnesota and much of the artwork was produced in Wales, resulting in a transatlantic collaboration as drafts were passed between the two groups. Michael Patella, OSB—chair of the Committee on Illumination and Text—explained the underlying purpose of the committee's work: "The illuminations are not illustrations. They are spiritual meditations on a text. It is a very Benedictine approach to Scriptures."

== The Saint John's Bible ==
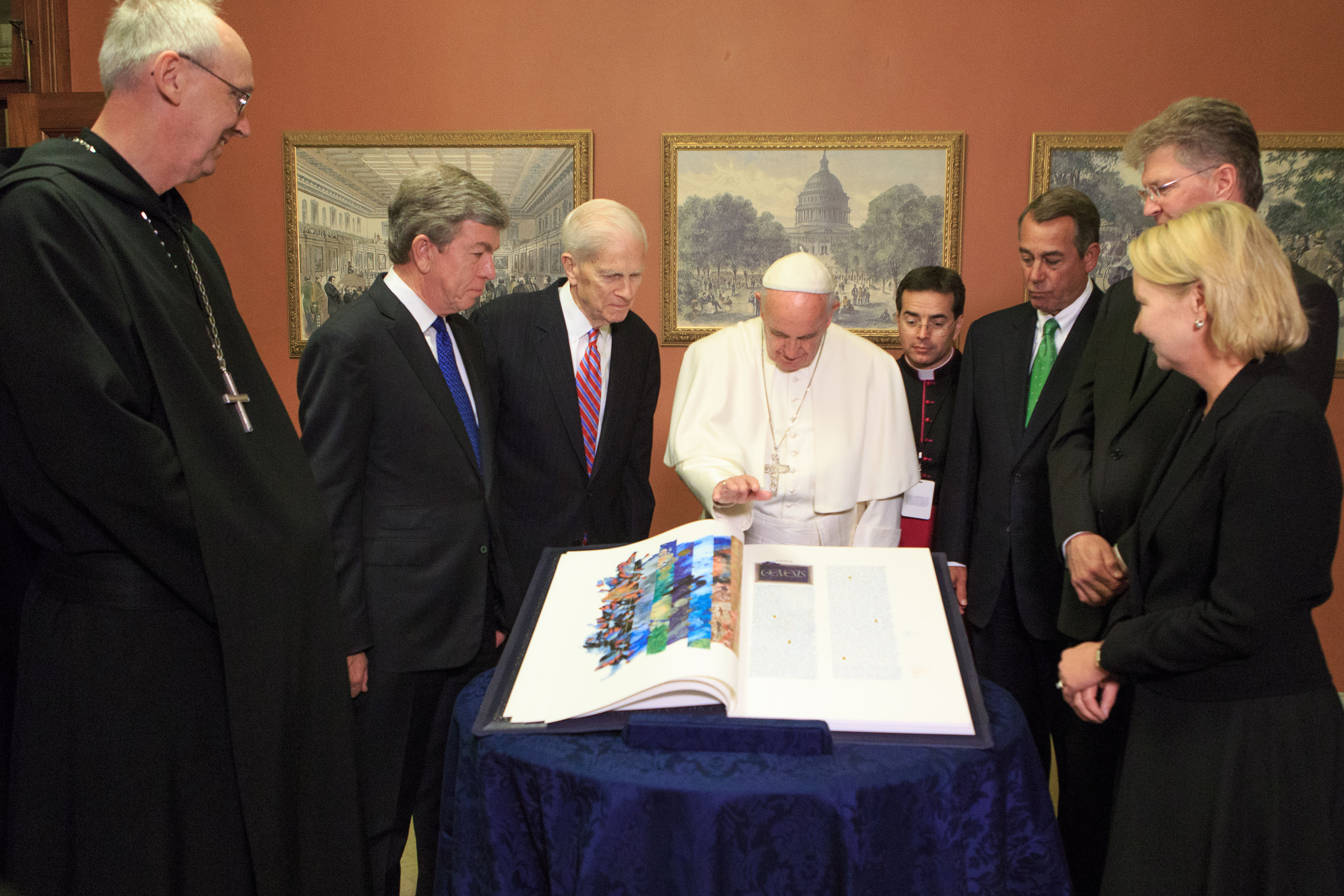
Pope Francis blesses a rare Apostles Edition of the Saint John's Bible given to the Library of Congress from Saint John's Abbey and University

=== Volumes ===
The Saint John's Bible consists of seven volumes:

1. Gospels and Acts (completed in May 2002): 25+ illuminations, including opening illuminations to each gospel
2. Pentateuch (completed in August 2003): Illuminated text from the first 5 books of the Old Testament
3. Psalms (completed in April 2004): Illuminations include the digital voice prints of songs from various ethnicities/religious backgrounds
4. Prophets (completed in April 2005): Includes Isaiah, Ezekiel, Jeremiah, Micah, Amos, Daniel, Zechariah, and Baruch
5. Wisdom Books (completed in July 2006): Includes Song of Solomon, Ecclesiastes, Proverbs, Job, Wisdom, and Sirach
6. Historical Books (completed in March 2010): Largest page count, 25+ illuminations, includes Joshua, Judges, Samuel, Kings, Judith, Esther, Ruth, Tobit, 1st and 2nd Maccabees
7. Letters and Revelation (completed 2011)

=== "Seeing the Word" curriculum ===
In collaboration with Saint John's School of Theology and Seminary, a curriculum was developed aiming to educate people on The Saint John's Bible and further its underlying goal of igniting the spiritual imagination. "Seeing the Word," co-produced by Liturgical Press, is a collection of resources which intends to promote guided reflection and meditation on The Saint John's Bible and its illuminations. The program follows the six steps of the prayer process of visio divina (based on Lectio Divina): listening, meditation, seeing, prayer, contemplation, and becoming Christ-like.

== Illuminations ==
There is a great variety of images utilized in The Saint John's Bible. Some of these are drawn from ancient and medieval Christian art, such as fish and trees, while others are more modern: a double helix DNA strand, Buddhist mandalas, and the Twin Towers of the World Trade Center in New York City. The majority of the flora and fauna depicted in the illuminations are native to the project's two homes in Minnesota and Wales. There are also many different depictions of Christ in different contexts. A series of reference books, titled The Art of the Saint John's Bible, have been published by Susan Sink to provide an index for the illustrations included in the volumes of The Saint John's Bible.

=== Content ===
Many of the illuminations reflect the blend of modern and ancient imagery. While helping conceptualize the illuminations, Jackson conducted research and observation of the antiques at the British Museum. The artists also incorporated imagery from documentary photos, such as a well-known image from the Holocaust of a pile of broken eyeglasses (seen in the book of Ezekiel). Also included in the illuminations are pages dedicated to specific motifs, such as the focus on fertility in the book of Sirach.

== Various Editions ==
There are currently three different editions (not including the original copy) of The Saint John's Bible in circulation.

=== Heritage Edition ===
The Heritage Edition of The Saint John's Bible is the full-size fine art reproduction of the original. Measuring two feet tall by three feet wide when open, it is the exact size of the original manuscript. Each volume of the Heritage Edition is signed by the chief scribe and illuminator, Donald Jackson. The edition is limited to 299 signed and numbered seven-volume sets and contains the same volumes as the original. Many of the illuminations are touched-up by hand, including the burnishing of gold leaf. In addition, an eighth volume of commentary that places The Saint John's Bible in its historical context and describes several of the illuminations will accompany the volumes.

Institutions and individuals around the world have acquired over 100 of the 299 available sets of the Heritage Edition, and many of these can be viewed by the public at locations in the United States, Italy, the United Kingdom, Canada, Australia and the Irish Republic. The Harold B. Lee Library at Brigham Young University has one of the Heritage Editions on display in its Special Collections department as do various other academic institutions.

=== Trade Edition ===
The Trade Edition of The Saint John's Bible are smaller, printed copies of the seven volumes available to the general public for purchase. They are roughly the size of coffee table books, and feature full-color reproductions of the original manuscript.

=== Apostles Edition ===
The Apostles Edition includes the following: the seven-volume Saint John's Bible, a custom dedication page in the Pentateuch volume, an original artwork by one of The Saint John's Bible illuminators, a deluxe viewing display and cabinet, and the donation of a seven-volume Heritage Edition to a qualified nonprofit institution. The 12 Apostles Editions are reserved for major donors to The Saint John's Bible program at Saint John's University. Only twelve copies of the Apostles Edition exist, and a few of these are currently being housed in the permanent collections at the Library of Congress, the Morgan Library, the Vatican Museum of Art, Saint Patrick's Cathedral (New York City), and other locations.

== Other recently produced handwritten/illuminated Bibles ==
Early in the marketing campaign, the commission responsible for The Saint John's Bible made the claim that it would be the first handwritten Bible in 500 years to the best of their knowledge. The commission was then made aware that several other Bibles had been previously completed, and in 2004 (between the April and May mailings of advertising for the Bible), the phrase "commissioned by a Benedictine Monastery" was added to the advertising and official website. At least one other privately illuminated manuscript with selections from the Bible—the Pepper Bible—preceded The Saint John's Bible in this timeframe.

== Staff ==
List of staff members on both the Minnesota and Wales teams during the creation of The Saint John's Bible:

- Artistic director: Donald Jackson
- Committee on Illumination and Text: Johanna Becker, Nathanael Hauser, Ellen Joyce, David Paul Lange, Irene Nowell, Michael Patella, (Chair of the committee) Simon-Hoa Phan, Alan Reed, Columba Stewart, Susan Wood, Rosanne Keller.
- Assistant: Linda Orzechowski
- Calligraphers: Sue Hufton, Sally Mae Joseph, Brian Simpson, Angela Swan, Susie Leiper
- Founding Director: Carol Marrin
- Operations Director: Craig Bruner
- Editor, "Seeing the Word": Barbara Sutton
- Graphic designer: Vin Godier
- Illuminators: Thomas Ingmire, Aidan Hart, Suzanne Moore, Diane von Arx, Sally Mae Joseph, Hazel Dolby, Andrew Jamieson
- Natural history illustrator: Chris Tomlin
- Project managers: Rebecca Cherry, Rachel Collard, Jane Grayer, Olivia (née Clarke) Edwards
- Studio assistants: Mark L'Argent, Sarah Harris-Richards
- Proofreader: Sally Sargeant
- Hebrew Script: Christopher Calderhead, Izzy Pludwinski
- Greek Script: Brian Simpson
- Executive director, Heritage Program: Jim Triggs

List of staff members currently serving The Saint John's Bible:

- Executive Director, Heritage Program: John F. Ross
- Director, Heritage Program: Brad Neary
- Assistant Director, Heritage Program: Meghan Stretar
- Program Coordinator, Heritage Program: Leila Utsch
- Director of The Saint John's Bible at the Hill Museum & Manuscript Library: Tim Ternes
