= Bernard Green =

The Reverend Dom Bernard Green OSB

Orders
- Ordination: 1975

Personal details
- Born: 1953
- Died: 22 March 2013 (aged 59–60)
- Education: University of Oxford; University of Cambridge
- Occupations: priest and monk
- Employer: Ampleforth Abbey
- Organization: Catholic Church
- Notable work: Christianity in Ancient Rome (2010); The Soteriology of Leo the Great (2008)
- Criminal charge: Indecent assault
- Criminal penalty: Community service (50 hours) and probation (2 years)
- Criminal status: Guilty

Edward Bernard Green OSB (1953–22 March 2013) was an English Catholic priest, Benedictine monk of Ampleforth Abbey, historian, and convicted sex offender.

== Biography ==
Green was educated at Oriel College, Oxford, where he received his BA in Modern History and later his MA. He became a Benedictine monk of Ampleforth Abbey in 1975 and was ordained a Catholic priest in 1981. He served as a history master at Ampleforth College from 1977 until 1995, and as housemaster of St Aidan's from 1992 until 1995. Green later took an MPhil in theology at the University of Cambridge and a DPhil in theology at the University of Oxford. He was appointed Fellow, Director of Studies, and Tutor in Theology at St Benet's Hall, Oxford, Research Fellow and Senior Member of Campion Hall, Oxford,. He also taught at the Centre for Medieval and Renaissance Studies.

Green maintained for many years a connection with the Ampleforth Hospitalité Notre Dame de Lourdes. He first visited the Sanctuary of Our Lady of Lourdes aged 11 during a pilgrimage that he had undertaken with his mother. Green later took part in five consecutive pilgrimages with the Ampleforth Hospitalité, and in 1986, following the award of a medal in recognition of his five pilgrimages, he was appointed director of the Ampleforth pilgrimage. In 1991 he became a titulaire of the Hospitalité Notre Dame de Lourdes. Green resigned the directorship of the Ampleforth pilgrimage after the 1995 pilgrimage. The reason for this was because he would have been unable to continue to participate in the pilgrimage after he had relocated to St Benet's Hall, Oxford.

During the period following his resignation of the directorship Green is said to have 'remained in the background'. During the period before his death he served as the pilgrimage's spiritual advisor. Green was the author of Not Strangers but Pilgrims: A History of Ampleforth in Lourdes (Ampleforth: Ampleforth Abbey Press, in association with Way Books, Campion Hall, Oxford, 2009; 191 pages, including 1 illustration), described by the Very Reverend Dom Terence Richardson, OSB, Prior of Ampleforth Abbey, as 'the definitive history of the Ampleforth Pilgrimage ... a work that was carefully researched, very readable and, at times, amusing and very effective in capturing the personalities of so many of the people who had been involved in the Pilgrimage over the years, while being very self-effacing about his own contributions. Green also undertook pilgrimages to Medjugorje and San Sebastián de Garabandal.

Green was a frequent contributor to The Tablet, for which he wrote about forty book reviews. His last review, of David Gwynn's Athanasius of Alexandria, was published posthumously on 13 April 2013.

Green appeared in a television series about the history of the Catholic Church in England.

== Indecent assault conviction and harassment allegations ==
In 1995, while serving as a housemaster of St Aidan's at Ampleforth College, Green indecently assaulted a 13-year-old boy while the boy slept in his dormitory. As soon as the allegation was made Green was suspended by the headmaster, Leo Chamberlain, who made the following statement: "The housemaster had entered a dormitory and touched a sleeping boy in a manner which he now recognises was inappropriate. We are conducting an immediate and full investigation. But our first concern is for the welfare of the boy concerned. Parents are being fully informed." At the same time, a spokesman for the school stated that the allegation was being investigated internally and that the school did not expect the allegation to become the subject of a police enquiry.

Green was arrested in response to an allegation that had been received by North Yorkshire Police. He is said to have co-operated fully during the investigation by both police and social services. Towards the end of February 1996 he was charged with indecent assault. In April 1996 Green pleaded guilty to this charge. During the court hearing the boy was said to have been 'petrified' during the incident. Green was sentenced to 50 hours' community service and two years of probation. At the time of his conviction statements were made stating, "Father Bernard will remain a Benedictine monk under the direct authority of the Abbot of Ampleforth. The Abbot will ensure that in future his work will not include any contact with or responsibility for children" and that "Father Bernard, in the light of his repentance and co-operation, will continue to live as a monk. Following the provisions of Church Law, any future exercise of his priesthood will be subject to canonical restrictions imposed by the Abbot of Ampleforth in Council. The restrictions will be designed to avoid any further problems with the young." Green was also barred by the Department for Education from teaching or undertaking any work with children or young persons under the age of 19.

In 1998, Green moved to St Benet's Hall, Oxford, and in 2000 began teaching at Oxford, in breach of his DfE ban. On 9 June 2005 an undergraduate at St Benet's Hall made a formal complaint of harassment against Green. The incident took place in the seventh week of the Trinity term during a picnic at Port Meadow, Oxford, organised by St Benet's Joint Common Room. Other students supported the complainant's allegation. A formal investigation was conducted on behalf of St Benet's and the proctors of the University of Oxford by a panel comprising one non-tutorial fellow of St Benet's and two independent members. The panel found that he was guilty of serious misconduct, and he was issued a five‑year final written warning. All parties were said to have been satisfied with the outcome and Green was reported to have made an apology.

In April 2010, Ampleforth Abbey investigated further allegations made against Green regarding sexual misconduct towards two adult men, but the investigation was inconclusive. In June 2012, Green was dismissed from St Benet's Hall after a review of the 1995 case revealed his teaching ban.

== Death ==
Green died on 22 March 2013, having suffered a massive heart attack during the night. His funeral rites took place on 3 and 4 April 2013 at Ampleforth Abbey; he was interred in Monks' Wood.

== Publications ==
- Bernard Green, Christianity in Ancient Rome: The First Three Centuries (London; New York: T. & T. Clark, 2010)
  - Reviews: Allen Brent, in Journal of Ecclesiastical History, 62 (2011), 564–5; Paul Cavill, in Church Times (1 October 2010); Robert Crotty, in Journal of Religious History, 36 (2012), 124–6; R. Ross Holloway, in Catholic Historical Review, 97 (2011), 110–111; Denis Minns, in Journal of Theological Studies, 62 (2011), 355–6; Dennis E. Trout, in Bryn Mawr Classical Review. Also featured in Michigan State University Libraries: Guides: Classical Studies: Mythology and Religion: Selected Books.
- Bernard Green, Not Strangers but Pilgrims: A History of Ampleforth in Lourdes (Ampleforth: Ampleforth Abbey Press, 2009)
  - Review: Nicholas King SJ, in The Tablet (8 October 2009).
- Bernard Green, The Soteriology of Leo the Great (Oxford; New York: Oxford University Press, 2008)
  - Reviews: J. Mark Armitage, in Reviews in Religion & Theology, 16 (2009), 257–9; Phillip Cary, in Journal of Religion, 90 (2010), 412–14; Kevin L. Hester, in Journal of Early Christian Studies, 17 (2009), 674–5; D.A. Keating, in Journal of Theological Studies, 60 (2009), 299–301; James K. Lee, in Religious Studies Review, 36 (2010), 83; R.A. Markus, in The Tablet (31 May 2008); David Meconi, in Heythrop Journal, 50 (2009), 713; Richard Price, in Journal of Ecclesiastical History, 60 (2009), 333; Norman Tanner, in Gregorianum, 89 (2008), fasc. iv: Recensiones, 890f.
- John Jolliffe, ed., English Catholic Heroes (Leominster: Gracewing, 2008) [chapter]
- Bernard Green, 'The Life and Times of St John Chrysostom', Ampleforth Journal, 112 (2007), 10–26
- Bernard Green, 'Benedict of Nursia, St.', in William M. Johnston, ed., Encyclopedia of Monasticism (2 vols., Chicago; London: Fitzroy Dearborn, 2000)
  - Review: Bennett Hill, in Catholic Historical Review, 87 (2001), 707-709: '... the entry of Bernard Green, OSB, on "Benedict of Nursia, St.," and the article by James Wiseman, OSB, "Church Councils, Recent Catholic," show rare levels of understanding as well as wisdom about their subjects.'
- Bernard Green, 'St Benedict of Nursia', in Gordon Beattie, ed., Gregory's Angels, 597–1997: A 1400 Year Celebration of the Order of Saint Benedict in the British Isles (Leominster: Gracewing, 1997), pp. 12–13
- Bernard Green, Monasticism to 1400 A.D. (Southport: Christian Theology Trust, 1996)
- Bernard Green, The Founder of Ampleforth: Bede Brewer, Ampleforth Journal, 79 (1984), 134–8
- Bernard Green, 'St Dunstan and the Monastic Reform', in David Hugh Farmer, ed., Benedict's Disciples (Leominster: Gracewing, 1980; 2nd edn. 1995), pp. 139–53
- Bernard Green, The English Benedictine Congregation: A Short History, with a foreword by Basil Hume (London: Catholic Truth Society, 1980)
- Placid Spearritt and Bernard Green, A History of the English Benedictine Congregation, 1558–1850: Introduction and Guide (Oxford: Oxford Microform, 1978) [Published together with Peter Athanasius Allanson, A History of the English Benedictine Congregation, 1558–1850 (compiled mid-19th century; published Oxford: Oxford Microform, 1978)]
  - Review: John Bossy, in Journal of Ecclesiastical History, 33 (1982), 312–13.
