= Richard Cooper (academic) =

British academic

Richard Anthony Cooper
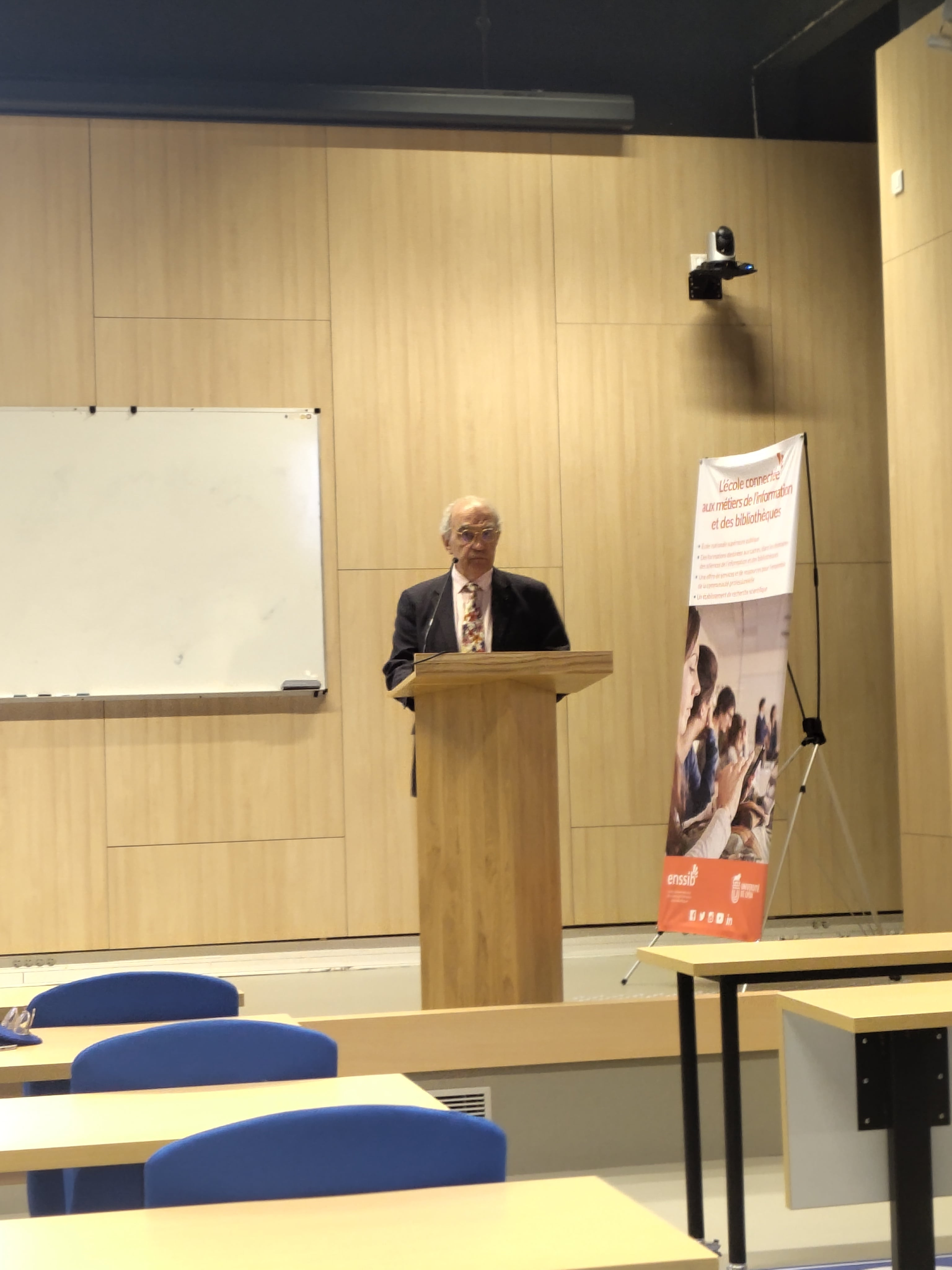
- Born: Lancashire
- Education: New College, Oxford
- Occupation: Master of St Benet's Hall, Oxford
- Title: Professor
- Spouse: Emanuela Tandello
- Children: 2 sons

Richard Anthony Cooper Master of St Benet's Hall, Oxford, from September 2018 until September 2022, is Emeritus Professor of French in the Faculty of Medieval and Modern Languages at Oxford University.

Cooper is also an Emeritus Fellow of Brasenose College, Oxford and former chairman of the Faculty Board of Modern Languages of the University of Oxford.

== Career ==
Educated at Manchester Grammar School, where Donald Adamson introduced him to foreign languages, Cooper went up to New College, Oxford, where he read French and Italian.

Cooper taught French at the University of Lancaster from 1971 before returning to Oxford in 1977 as a tutor in French at Brasenose College. He was appointed Reader in 1996 and subsequently Professor in 1998. He is a member of the Académie des Sciences, Belles Lettres et Arts and of the Institut des Sciences de l'Homme, Lyon.

Professor Cooper was selected as a torchbearer for the 2012 Summer Olympics Torch Relay, reflecting his 40 years of service to sport at the Oxford University, including 15 years as Chairman of the University Sports Committee.

=== Honours ===
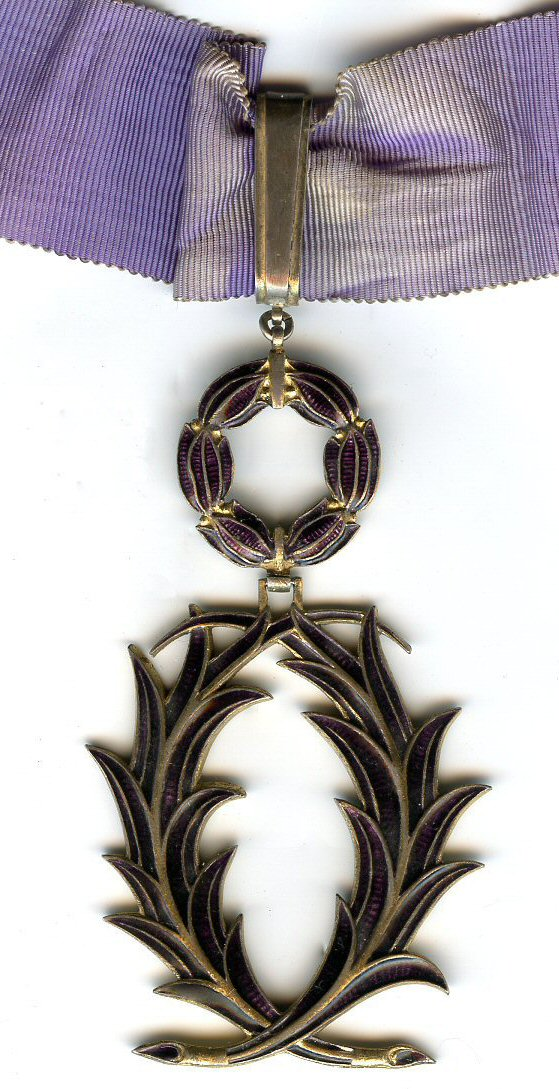
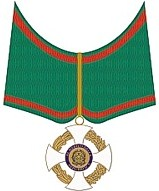

Appointed Officier dans l'ordre des Palmes Académiques in 1996 (promoted Commandeur in 2012), Cooper also became Commendatore dell'Ordine al Merito della Repubblica Italiana in 2003.

== Selected publications ==
- Rabelais et l'Italie (1991)
- Litteræ in tempore belli: Études sur les relations littéraires italo-françaises pendant les guerres d'Italie (1997)
- Maurice Scève: The Entry of Henri II into Lyon, September 1548, text with an introduction and notes (1997)
- Rabelais, Gargantua and Pantagruel, trans. Sir Thomas Urquhart (1999)
- Contributor: Jean du Bellay, Poemata, with G. Demerson (2007)
- Chrétiens et mondains, poèmes épars: vol. 8 of Œuvres complètes de Marguerite de Navarre (2007).

Academic offices
Preceded by Werner Jeanrond	Master of St Benet's Hall, Oxford; 2018–2022	office abolished
