= St Benet's Hall Boat Club =

British rowing club

Reuben Boat Club
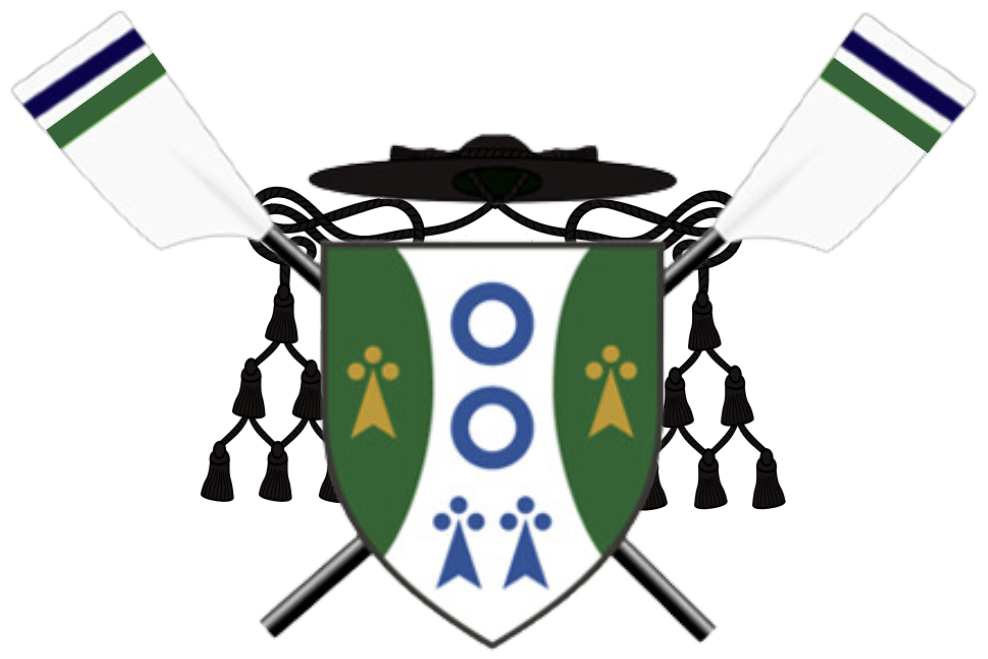

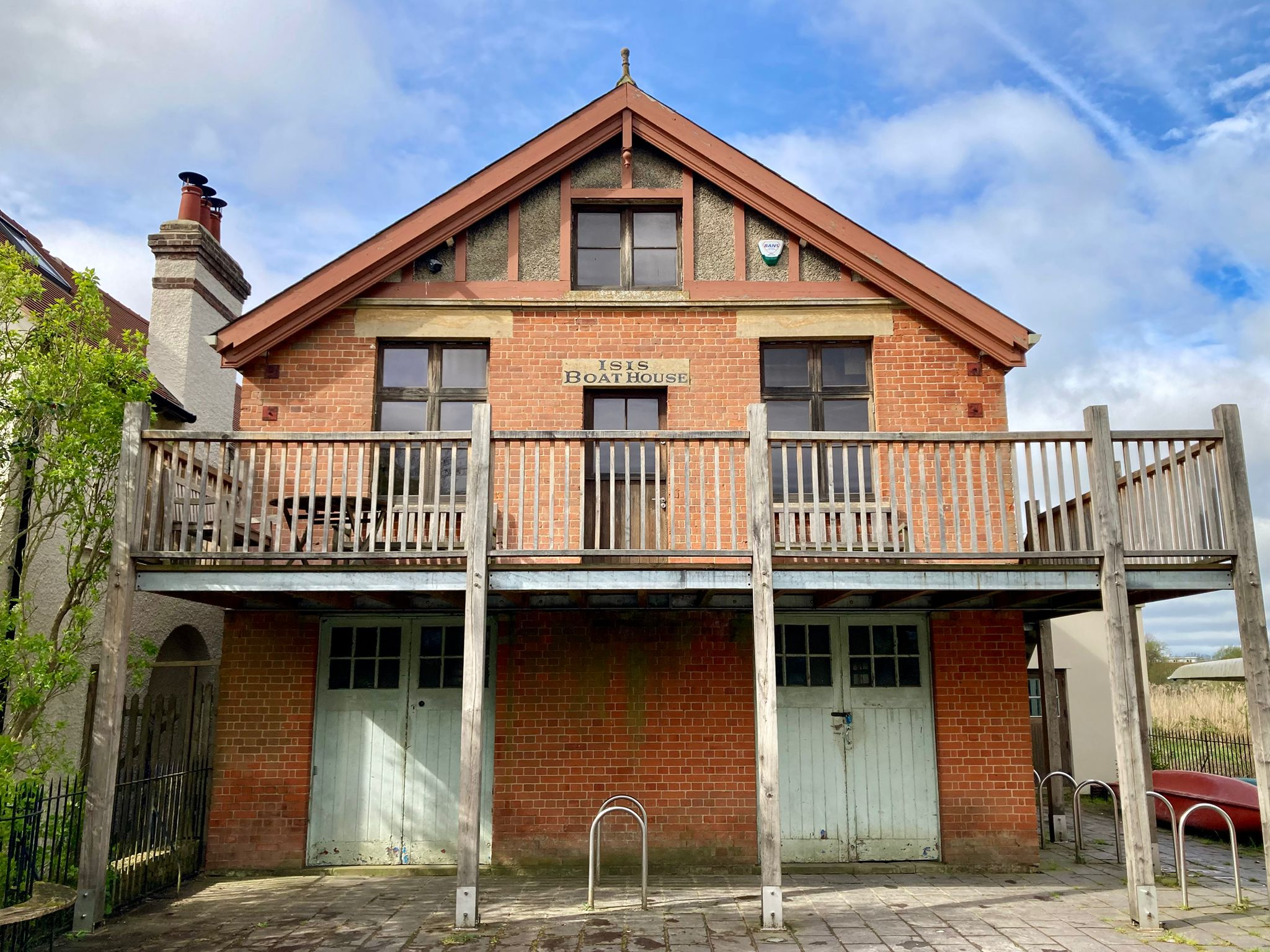

- Location: Oxford
- Coordinates: 51.743659°N 1.250099°W
- Home water: The Isis
- Founded: 1981
- Former names: St Benet's Hall Boat Club
- University: University of Oxford
- Affiliations: British Rowing (boat code SBH)

Reuben Boat Club (officially St Benet's, Blackfriars’ and Reuben College Boat Club) is a rowing club in Oxford for members and alumni of St Benet's Hall, Reuben College, Blackfriars Hall, and St Stephen's House.

The club was founded as the boat club of St Benet's Hall, a permanent private hall of the University of Oxford with Benedictine roots and which closed in 2022. The boat club survived this closure, but merged with rowers from the recently founded Reuben College in the summer of 2023. Through this incorporation, Reuben Boat Club has inherited the equipment, resources, alumni, and bumps positions of St Benet's Hall Boat Club.

The club boats from the Isis Boathouse, built 1905, below the Gut on Haystacks Corner, near Iffley Lock on the River Isis (Thames).

== History ==
A boat club for St Benet's Hall was founded in 1981, with the purchase of a wooden shell, but momentum waned until the monk William Wright OSB caused the purchase of a new eight in 1991, 'Victory', and St Benet's Hall became regular contenders in the Torpids and Summer Eights races in Oxford.

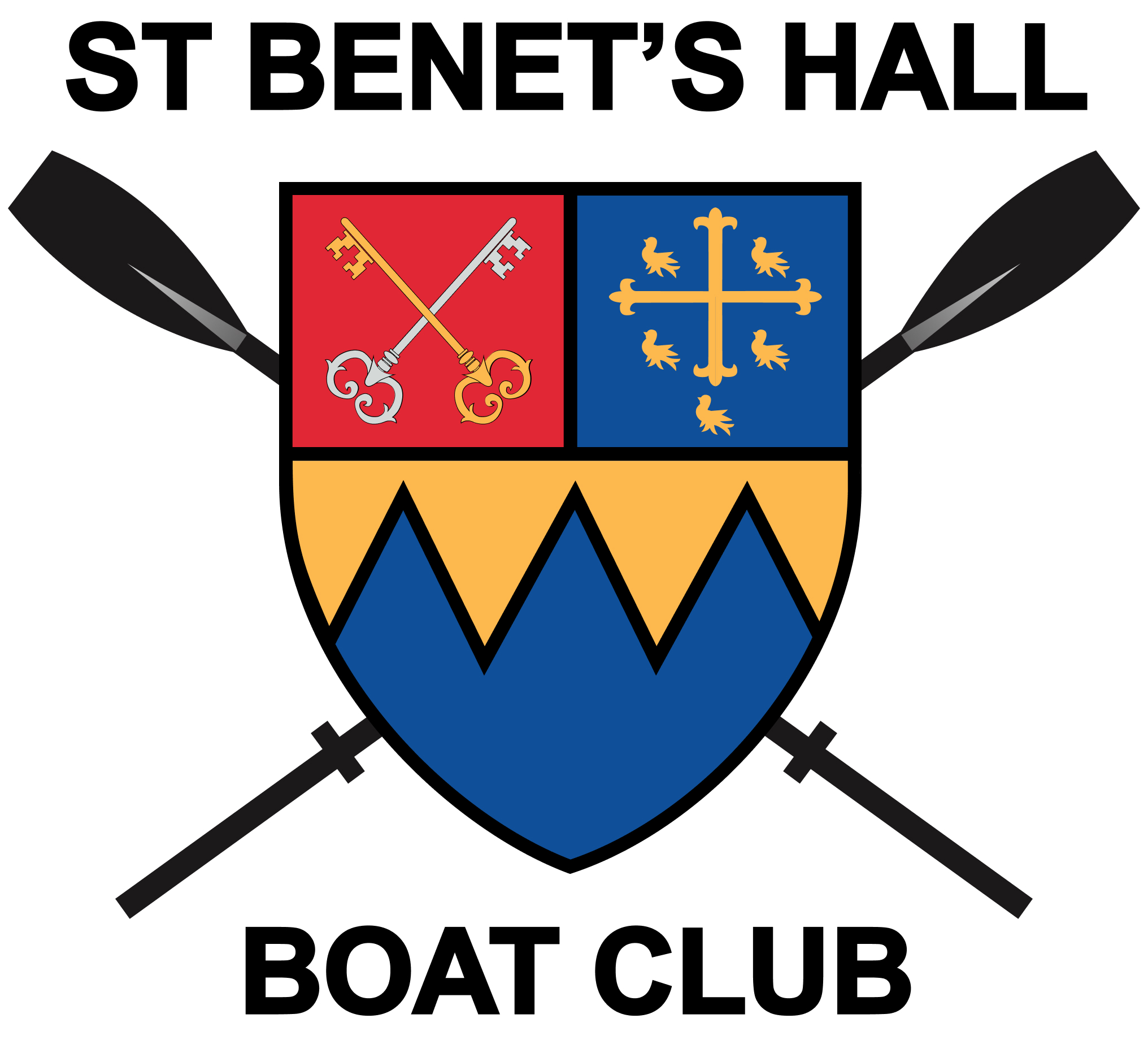
Escutcheon of St Benet's Hall Boat Club

The subsequent 30 years saw the men's side enjoy periods of considerable success, moving up to division 4 in both Torpids and Eights in the mid-2000s. The club won blades on several occasions during this period. In 2015 the men's crew secured discretionary blades for their performance in Eights, the crew re-established firmly in fixed divisions, and in 2019, they secured blades again in a monumental Torpids run that saw them move up 7 places back into fixed divisions.

The first women's boat, 'Ithaca', was purchased in 2016, the year women could first join the Hall as undergraduates. The St Benet's Hall women went on to compete in several regattas, qualifying for their first Summer Eights in 2018, and then their first Torpids in 2019. In Summer Eights 2019 they achieved their first bump, and bumped on three out of four days (missing out on the fourth bump, and blades, because of a klaxon). A new boat, the ‘Gowney-Hedges’, was kindly purchased by Rhys and Gillian Hedges after their impressive 2019 bumps campaign.

Former Rowing Blade

Since May 2021 the official main sponsor of the boat club has been Fintalent.io

Although St Benet's Hall closed in 2022, the boat club continued to operate independently until incorporation. Significantly, for the first time in the club's history, St Benet's Hall women won blades in Summer Eights 2022, moving up 7 places and achieving five bumps in five starts.

From the foundation of the college until the close of the 2022/2023 academic year, members of Reuben College had instead rowed as full members of Linacre Boat Club. Linacre Boat Club is the boat club for members of Linacre and Nuffield colleges in the university.

== Since incorporation ==
In 2025 the club saw its first members compete in The Boat Race. Felix Rawlinson, of Reuben College, became the club's first men's representative and Lilli Freischem, also of Reuben College, became the first to race in the women's. Lilli Freischem was selected again in 2026, where she raced in opposition to her sister Mia.

Presidents

Year	Name
2023-24	Ambre Bertrand
2024-25	Eliza Rayner
2025-26	Jakub Hantabal
2026-27	Sophie Brixton

Women’s captains

Year	Name
2023-24	Zoë Wong and Eliza Rayner
2024-25	Rachel Anscombe and Emelie Shepherd
2025-26	Rachel Anscombe and Eliza Rayner
2026-27	Amelia Ligeza and Madeline Carey

Men’s captains

Year	Name
2023-24	Max Brzezicki and Jakub Hantabal
2024-25	Ethan Phillips
2025-26	Henry Hall and Harry Manship
2026-27	Benoit Corriveau and Loïc Dewitte

== Honours ==
Men's boat race

Year	Name
2025	Felix Rawlinson

Women's boat race

Year	Name
2025	Lilli Freischem
2026	Lilli Freischem

== See also ==
- University rowing (UK)
- Oxford University Boat Club
- Rowing on the River Thames
