= Thomas Ingmire =

American calligrapher

Thomas Ingmire is an American calligrapher, born in 1942 in Fort Wayne, Indiana. In 1977 he became the first American elected to England's Society of Scribes and Illuminators with a craft membership status. He is one of the illuminators of the St. John's Bible.

Ingmire received his B.A. in landscape architecture from Ohio State University and his MLA from UCB. He was a 1980 recipient of a Newberry Fellowship. In 1998, he was awarded a commission for public art installation at Mountain View Public Library

== Literature ==
- Wilson, Janet, 1984, "Where Word and Image Meet -Thomas Ingmire," CALLIGRAPHY IDEA EXCHANGE, Vol. 2, No. 3.
- Malone, Helen, 1995, “The Art of Politics: A Discussion of Thomas Ingmire’s The American Way in the context of Jasper John’s Flag,” Letter Arts Review, Vol. 12
- Gullick, Michael, 1989, WORDS OF RISK, THE ART OF THOMAS INGMIRE
