= Werner Jeanrond =

Norwegian theologian (born 1955)

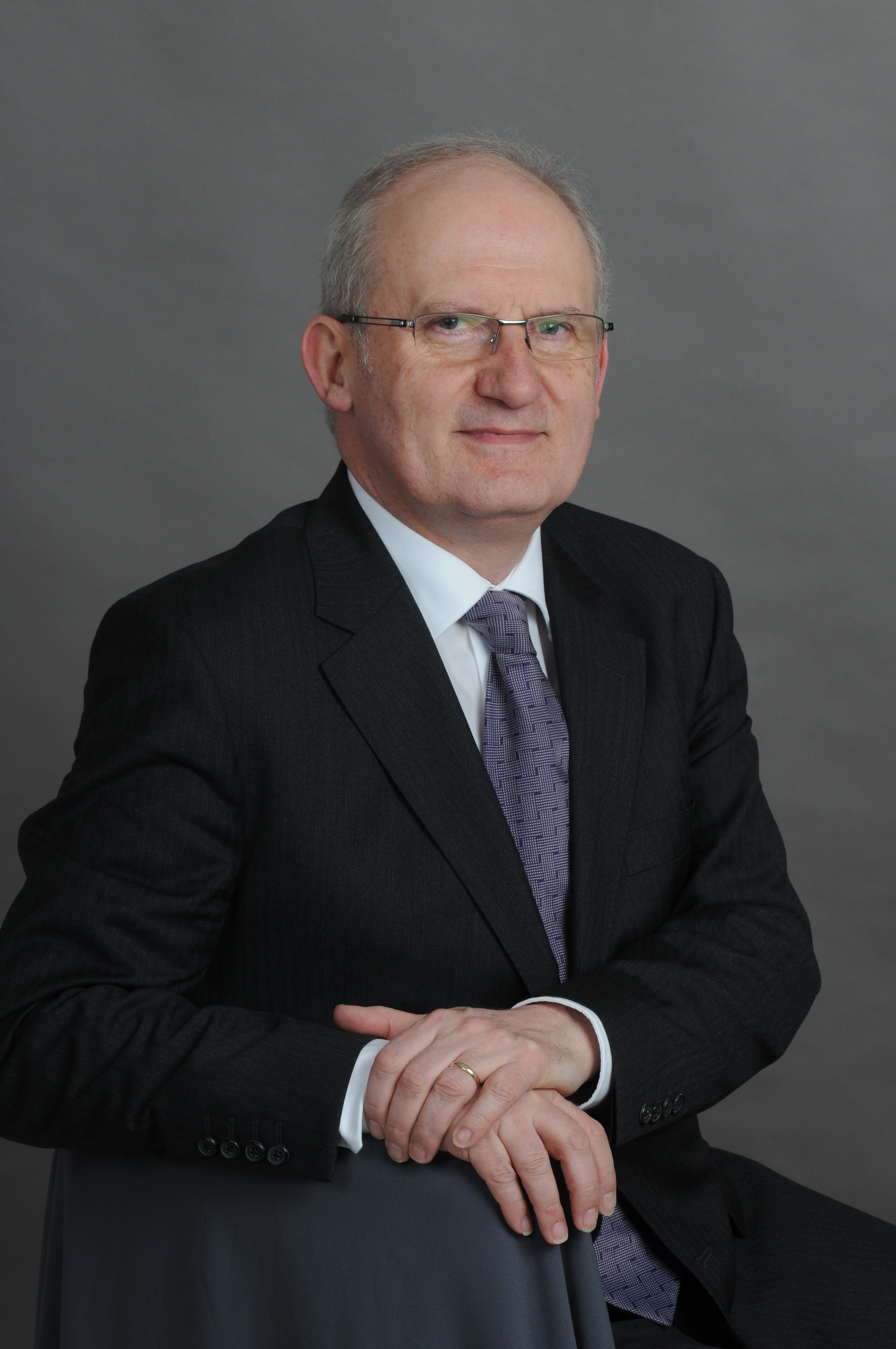
- Jeanrond in 2012 at the University of Glasgow
- Born: 2 March 1955 (age 71); Saarbrücken, Saar Protectorate
- Citizenship: German
- Education: Staatsexamen (Saarbrücken), PhD (Chicago), MA (Dublin), MA (Oxford), DD (University of Toronto)
- Alma mater: University of Saarland
- Occupation: Theologian
- Years active: 1981–present
- Spouse: Betty Claesson Jeanrond

Werner Günter Adolf Jeanrond was Professor of Systematic Theology with special responsibility for Dogmatics at the University of Oslo. He is retired.

== Background ==
Jeanrond is a German Roman Catholic theologian. He was born in 1955 in Saarbrücken in the Saar Protectorate, now Saarland, Germany. He was raised in Kleinblittersdorf, a village on the German-French border. His father served as the village's mayor twice. In 2018, he was appointed Professor of Systematic Theology with special responsibility for Dogmatics at the University of Oslo. He was the first Catholic theologian to hold this post in the university's traditionally Lutheran Faculty of Theology. He retired in 2022.

== Education and academic career ==
Jeanrond studied theology, German language and literature, and educational science at the Universities of Saarbrücken, Regensburg and Chicago. In 1979, he took his master's degree (Staatsexamen) at the University of Saarbrücken. In 1984, he was awarded a PhD at the University of Chicago (under the direction of David Tracy and Paul Ricoeur) where he was a Fulbright scholar. In 1985, he was awarded the degree of MA jure officii at Trinity College Dublin.

From 1981 to 1994, he was Lecturer and Senior Lecturer in theology at Trinity College Dublin and Fellow of Trinity College. From 1995 to 2007, he was Professor of Systematic Theology at the University of Lund in Sweden. While in Lund, he supervised the doctoral dissertation of Antje Jackelén who was the first woman to be Archbishop of Uppsala and Primate of the Church of Sweden.

From 2008 to 2012, he was Professor of Divinity holding the 1640 Chair of Divinity at the University of Glasgow. After his departure from Glasgow, he was appointed an Honorary Senior Research Fellow thus maintaining a link with that university.

From 2012 to 2018, he was Master of St Benet's Hall at the University of Oxford, and a member of the Faculty of Theology and Religion. He was the first lay Master in the history of St. Benet's Hall. As an Oxford Head of House and also as a holder of the MA from the University of Dublin, he incepted to the degree of MA ad eundem gradum at the University of Oxford.

He has academic administrative experience in a number of roles, including as Head of the School of Biblical and Theological Studies in Trinity College Dublin; as Dean of the Faculty of Theology and Vice-Dean of Humanities at Lund University; as elected member of the Swedish Research Council and the Nordic Research Council for the Humanities and Social Sciences; as Research Convenor and Deputy Head of the School of Critical Studies in the University of Glasgow; as a longtime member of the Board and Foundation of Concilium and of many other editorial and academic boards and committees.

== Research interests ==
Systematic theology (Doctrine of God, Christology, ecclesiology, eschatology, soteriology); theological and philosophical hermeneutics; theological method; theology of religions; theology of love; theology of hope; political theology.

== Academic awards and honours ==
Jeanrond was awarded a Fulbright Fellowship for his doctoral studies at the University of Chicago (1979–1981), a research fellowship at the Herzog August Library Wolfenbüttel (1989), a research fellowship at the Danish Institute for Advanced Studies in the Humanities (2002–03), a Robertson Fellowship at the University of Glasgow (2004), and a research fellowship at the Center for Subjectivity Research at the University of Copenhagen (2007).

He has held visiting professorships at the universities of Uppsala, Chicago, Regensburg, and Riga. He has delivered a number of established lectures, including the Waldenström Lectures (Stockholm), the Wesley Lectures (Gothenburg), the Donnellan Lectures (Dublin), the Aquinas Lecture (Glasgow), and the Gonzaga Lecture (Glasgow), and has lectured at many universities and research institutions in Europe, Asia and North America.

In 2023, Jeanrond was awarded the degree of Doctor of Divinity honoris causa by Regis College, University of Toronto, for his contributions to academia, church, and society.

== Select publications ==
- Jeanrond, Werner G. (2026). Tro och kärlek (in Swedish). Stockholm: Verbum. ISBN 978-91-526-0224-9.
- Jeanrond, Werner G. (2020). Reasons to hope. London: T & T Clark. ISBN 978-0-567-66894-3. OCLC 974672870. Translated into Swedish.
- Jeanrond, Werner G. (2012). Teologiska reflexioner. 3, Kyrkans framtid (in Swedish). Lund: Arcus. ISBN 978-91-88553-20-1. OCLC 939892343.
- Jeanrond, Werner G. (2010). A theology of love. London: T & T Clark. ISBN 978-0-567-46912-0. OCLC 676697840. Translated into Chinese, Danish, Italian, Spanish, and Swedish.
- Jeanrond, Werner G. (1995). Call and response : the challenge of Christian life. New York: Continuum. ISBN 0-8264-0790-0. OCLC 31516949. Translated into German and Swedish.
- Jeanrond, Werner G. (1994). Theological hermeneutics. London: SCM. ISBN 0-334-01624-X. OCLC 31817843. Translated into French, Italian, Korean, Polish and Turkish.
- Jeanrond, Werner G. (2005). Text and interpretation as categories of theological thinking. Eugene, Ore.: Wipf and Stock. ISBN 1-59752-436-0. OCLC 69676574.
- Jeanrond, Werner G. (1986). Text und Interpretation als Kategorien theologischen Denkens (in German). Tübingen: Mohr. ISBN 3-16-145101-5. OCLC 14947906.
- Freyne, Seán.; Jeanrond, Werner G.; Mayes, A. D. H. (2006). Recognising the margins : developments in biblical and theological studies : essays in honour of Seán Freyne. Blackrock, Co. Dublin: Columba Press. ISBN 1-85607-549-4. OCLC 84899066.
- Jeanrond, Werner G.; Lande, Aasulv (2005). The concept of God in global dialogue. Maryknoll, N.Y.: Orbis Books. ISBN 1-57075-586-8. OCLC 58546659.

== Festschrifts/Essays in honour of Werner G. Jeanrond ==
- Schmiedel, Ulrich; Sigurdson, Ola; Svenungsson, Jayne (2026). Engaging Werner G. Jeanrond's Theological Thinking: Starting Points. London, UK: T&T Clark/Bloomsbury. ISBN 978-0-5677-1927-0. OCLC 1579637906.
- Schmiedel, Ulrich; Matarazzo, James (2015). Dynamics of difference : Christianity and alterity, a Festschrift for Werner G. Jeanrond. London, UK: Bloomsbury Academic. ISBN 978-0-567-67183-7. OCLC 999625083.

Academic offices
Preceded by Göran Bexell	Dean of Theology and Vice-Dean of Humanities, University of Lund; 1999–2007	Succeeded by Fredrik Lindström
Preceded by George McLeod Newlands	Professor of Divinity, University of Glasgow; 2008–2012	Succeeded by George Pattison
Preceded by Felix Stephens	Master of St Benet's Hall, Oxford; 2012–2018	Succeeded by Richard Cooper
Preceded by Kjetil Hafstad	Professor of Systematic Theology, University of Oslo; 2018–2022	Succeeded by Ola Sigurdson
