= Felix Stephens =

Master of St Benet's Hall, Oxford

The Revd Dom Felix Stephens, OSB (born 6 August 1942 in Montpellier, Cheltenham, Gloucestershire) was Master of St Benet's Hall, Oxford from 2007 to 2012.

Born as John Patrick Rhodes Stephens, he was educated at Ampleforth College, where he was a member of St Hugh's House, and at St Benet's Hall, Oxford. During this time, he played three first-class cricket matches for Oxford University Cricket Club as a right-handed opening or upper order batsman.

On profession as a Benedictine monk he took the name Felix. He taught at Ampleforth College, serving as Procurator, Housemaster of St Bede's, and Second Master, as well as coaching the 1st XI (cricket). He is Editor of Ampleforth Journal and was formerly Honorary Secretary of the Ampleforth Society. He has also been Parish Priest of St Mary's Church, Warrington.

In 2003 he was celebrant at the funeral of Hugo Young. In September 2007 he became the tenth Master of St Benet's Hall, Oxford.

Preceded by Leo Chamberlain	Master of St Benet's Hall, Oxford; 2007–2012	Succeeded by Werner G Jeanrond
