= Leo Chamberlain =

British monk and teacher

Leo Chamberlain OSB (13 August 1940 – 23 November 2019) was master of St Benet's Hall, Oxford, a monk of Ampleforth Abbey, and headmaster of Ampleforth College. (Fr Leo was christened 'George'; He was given the monastic name 'Leo' when he joined the monastery after he graduated. Traditionally, he became 'George Leo Chamberlain'. Throughout his time as a pupil at Ampleforth, he was known as 'George'.)

Educated at Ampleforth, George (Leo) Chamberlain subsequently attended Oxford University (University College) between 1958 and 1961, holding the Burn Open Scholarship in History, and following his graduation took a post at Ampleforth teaching history, theology, and politics. Having taken monastic vows he was ordained priest in 1968.

Responsible for a number of innovations (including the establishment of the school's golf course between 1963 and 1987), he became the school's youngest ever housemaster in 1972, and was appointed head of history shortly afterwards. Becoming headmaster of Ampleforth in 1992, he oversaw the first admission of girls to what had previously been a single sex college. Having retired from teaching in December 2003, he became master of St Benet's Hall on 1 September 2004. He retired as Master in 2007 and was succeeded by Felix Stephens and became parish priest of St John the Evangelist Catholic Church, Easingwold, Yorkshire.

== Childhood and youth ==
Leo Chamberlain was born on 13 August 1940 in Kent during the Battle of Britain. His father, Noel, from a Catholic Lancashire family in 1895, had been the second Ampleforth alumnus to hold an open Award at Oxford (he was an Exhibitioner of University College). He had joined the army in 1914, and then became a professional soldier, accepting a captain's commission in the new Army Education Corps in 1920. Leo's mother, Sally, was born in India. After her own father's early death, she went to the Lawrence school on Mount Abu, and followed her mother into training as a nurse. Her training incomplete, she nursed her mother in her last illness and then returned to England and work as a governess. His parents met in Blackheath after both had come to England.

His father's military career meant that, according to his mother, the family lived in 18 different homes in Leo's childhood and youth. The war was spent in Edinburgh while Colonel Chamberlain pioneered the work of Army Education for the armies in Italy. After that came a move to Harrogate which, off and on, was to be the main family base ever after. After an interval in Egypt, marred by discovery of ill health, said to be an obscure form of tuberculosis, Leo went to Gilling Castle, Ampleforth's prep school, in 1949, but spent most of the next two years in the hands of doctors in England and Switzerland. On the road to recovery, he went back to Ampleforth and entered the Upper School in 1954. An early enthusiasm for rugby was ended when the doctors forbade contact sport, not a route to popularity or distinction in a sports conscious school. Academic progress brought a modest crop of O levels and entry three years running to A level, ending satisfactorily. He had achieved commoner entry to University College in the same year, and matriculated in 1958 at 18 years old. This meant that he was still eligible for the scholarship examination, and that friendly College awarded him the Open Burn scholarship, the top history scholarship at the end of his first term. {https://stjohntheevangelisteasingwold.co.uk/news/}

== Religious life ==
Leo Chamberlain took his simple (temporary) vows at Ampleforth in 1962, followed by the usual course of study towards ordination, all at Ampleforth, combined increasingly with the teaching of History and other activity in the school. Solemn vows came in 1965 and ordination as a priest in 1968. Life was not all prayer and teaching. He established the college bookshop on a more ambitious scale from 1968, ran the business side of the Ampleforth Journal, and for some 25 years built up the golf course with devoted teams of boys who preferred looking after grass to games. Altogether, he tended to stick with jobs. In 1972 he became a housemaster and held the job for 20 years. He was also named the head of history several years later, holding that appointment for nearly as long.

There was time also to support Christians under persecution in central and eastern Europe. He worked for a time with the Catholic charity, Aid to the Church in Need, and for a long period with Keston Institute, promoting directly aid to the Church and people of Poland in the Solidarity period, and, in 1990 set up the first major international conference of Christians from east and west at Ampleforth. In 1992 he was appointed headmaster of Ampleforth, leading the school through a period of change and development. Between 1992 and 2003, the school's A level pass rates rose beyond grade inflation, and the school's facilities underwent redevelopment. Roughly £20m was invested in the school over a ten-year period. Girls arrived in the sixth form in 2001, and their introduction at 13+ was planned for 2004. He continued teaching A level history into his fortieth year of teaching at that level, valuing the contact and the discussion offered by his sets, and benefiting from the open friendliness and friendship of generations of Amplefordians. He retired in December 2003 at age 63, and became Master of St Benet's Hall in September 2004, retiring in 2007.
