= Hill Museum & Manuscript Library =

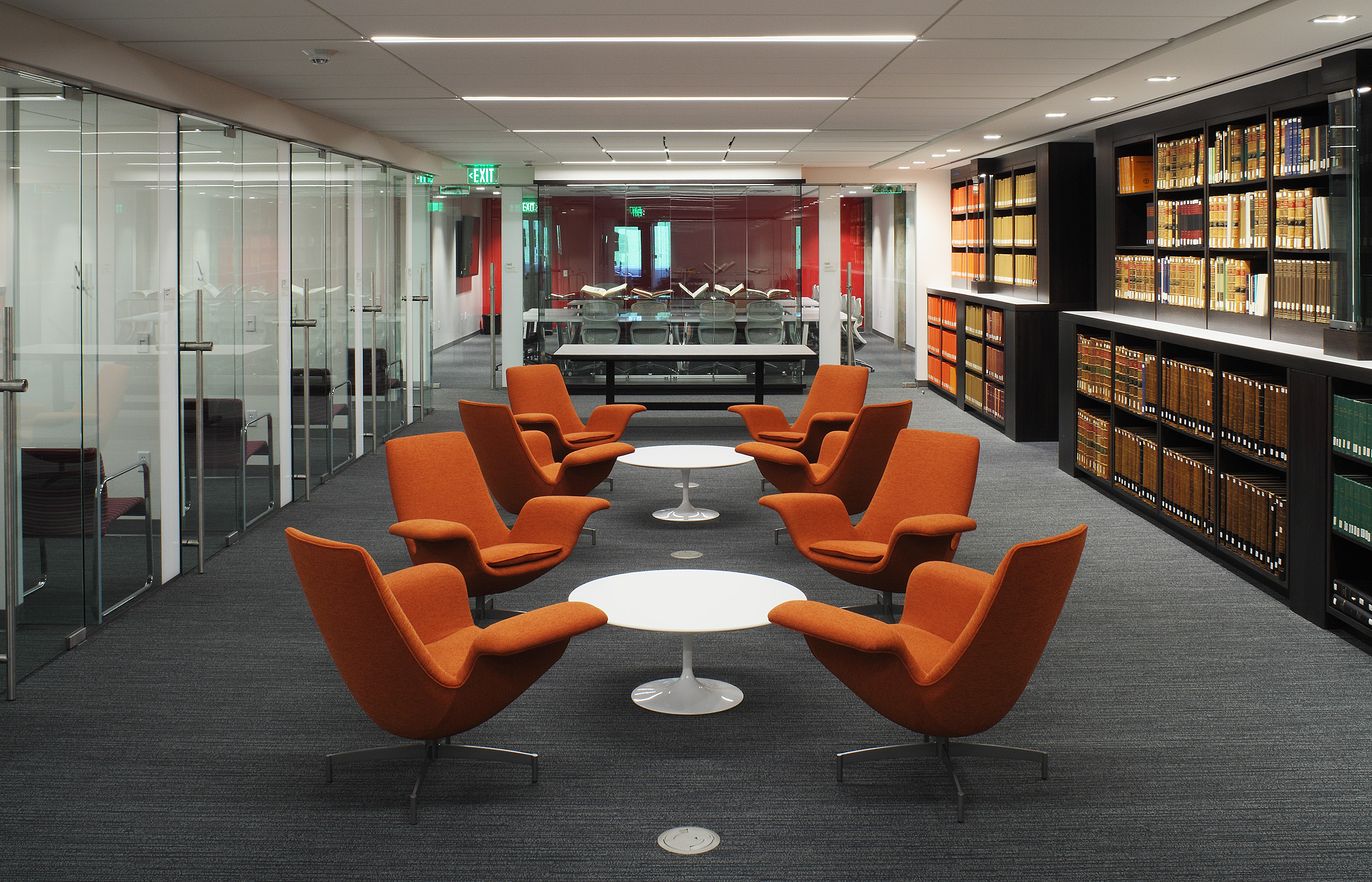
- Former name: Monastic Manuscript Microfilm Library (1964-1975); Hill Monastic Manuscript Library (1975-2005)
- Established: 1965
- Location: Collegeville, Minnesota
- Coordinates: 45°34′53.24″N 94°23′32.84″W
- Type: Museum and library
- Key holdings: Manuscripts
- Collection size: 413,000
- Director: Columba Stewart
- Architect: Marcel Breuer
- Website: www.hmml.org

The Hill Museum & Manuscript Library (HMML) is a nonprofit organization that photographs, catalogs, and provides free access to collections of manuscripts located in libraries around the world.

HMML prioritizes manuscripts located in regions endangered by war, political instability, or other threats. HMML is currently photographing manuscripts in Bosnia and Herzegovina, Egypt, Gaza, Great Britain, India, Iraq, Italy, Lebanon, Mali, Malta, Mauritania, Montenegro, Pakistan, Slovenia, and Yemen. HMML's mission is to preserve and share the world's handwritten past to inspire a deeper understanding of our present and future.

As of 2025, HMML has preserved digital or microfilm images of approximately 486,000 manuscripts in partnership with more than 1,500 libraries worldwide. Additionally, HMML's reference collection holds approximately 50,000 volumes on topics related to manuscripts, printed books, art, and liturgy. HMML's Special Collections and Art & Photographs collection contain more than 11,000 rare books and 7,000 art objects. Once photographed and cataloged, the manuscripts and artwork are made freely available online in HMML Reading Room and Museum.

== History ==
HMML was founded in 1964 on the campus of Saint John's Abbey and University in Collegeville, Minnesota. The creation of HMML was a response to the global threat of the Cold War and the loss of manuscripts and books in European libraries during World War I and World War II. Preservation copies were made by microfilming each manuscript page then cataloging (library science) the photographic copies.

The idea to establish HMML was launched by Saint John's University president Father Colman Barry, OSB, and the organization was first led by Father Oliver Kapsner, OSB, a trained librarian and linguist. Both were monks at Saint John's Abbey, part of a Benedictine community with a long-standing tradition of copying manuscripts.

HMML's first preservation projects were at Benedictine monasteries in Austria, starting in 1965. Over the course of seven years, HMML staff and local technicians created microfilm copies of more than 30,000 manuscripts.

The 1970s saw HMML's first projects in Africa and an expansion of HMML's operations in Europe, the latter including projects in Germany, Spain, and Malta. In 1973, The Malta Study Center was established at HMML to preserve and make accessible the handwritten culture of Malta and the Sovereign Military Order of Saint John of Jerusalem, of Rhodes, and of Malta (also known as the Order of Malta). The Center has since photographed and cataloged materials located in various repositories in Europe and the United States.

In Ethiopia, HMML began its first project with Eastern Christian manuscripts and its first in Africa. The work in Ethiopia began 1974 continued throughout 1980s and into the early 1990s, with cameras operating as the country underwent political upheaval and civil war. More than 9,000 manuscripts were microfilmed, forming a collection known as the Ethiopian Manuscript Microfilm Library (EMML). Microfilm copies of these manuscripts were made widely available through extensive cataloging by Professor Getatchew Haile and his colleague, Dr. William Macomber.

During those decades, the scope of HMML's work widened to include libraries of more religious orders, as well as universities and national libraries. By the end of the twentieth century, HMML had created a manuscript archive on more than 90,000 reels of microfilm, with some reels containing images of dozens of manuscripts.

In 2003, advancements in digital photography made it possible to capture high-resolution color images of manuscript pages using cost-effective, durable equipment, and HMML stopped photographing manuscripts with microfilm, instead creating preservation copies through digital imaging. Microfilm images are digitally scanned for access and long-term preservation. All digital images and cataloging are made available online in HMML Reading Room and Museum.

Columba Stewart became HMML's executive director in 2003, and HMML began its first digitization projects in the Middle East, starting in Lebanon and quickly expanding to Iraq and Syria. Over the course of the coming years, HMML expanded its projects in Africa and began its first projects in Asia.

Mali is home to HMML's largest preservation project to date, resulting in approximately 3.6 million unique image files representing more than 249,000 manuscripts. The project focuses on the West African Islamic traditions found in the libraries and manuscripts of Timbuktu, Djenné, and other locations. HMML partnered with several organizations to complete this work, including the NGO SAVAMA-DCI, which helped digitize hundreds of thousands of manuscripts that had been evacuated from Timbuktu to Bamako before the rebel occupation of the city in 2012.

Since its founding, HMML and its partners have photographed approximately 450,000 manuscripts; of those, more than 145,000 manuscripts have been cataloged and represented online in HMML Reading Room.

== Global operations ==
HMML digitally preserves, catalogs, and provides free access to manuscript collections worldwide, giving special priority to manuscripts located in regions endangered by war, political instability, and other threats.

Partnerships and contracts with libraries, archives, and other manuscript repositories allow HMML to create digital images of the manuscripts in their collections and to share these images online.

Digitization is done entirely through local teams, with HMML providing equipment, training, technical support, and payment. Everything in a collection is photographed, because none of us know what might be significant in the future. Copies of the digital photographs are given to the library that holds the manuscripts, as well as commercial and publication rights to those images. None of the original manuscripts are ever removed from a library by HMML.

HMML employs staff in the U.S. and other countries to catalog the manuscript images and make them freely available online in HMML Reading Room.

HMML has photographed manuscripts located in Africa (Egypt, Ethiopia, Libya, Mali, Mauritania, and South Africa), Asia (India, Nepal, Pakistan, and Turkey), Europe (Austria, Bosnia and Herzegovina, Croatia, Germany, Great Britain, Hungary, Italy, Montenegro, Portugal, Romania, Slovenia, Spain, Sweden, Switzerland, and Ukraine), the Middle East (Gaza, Iraq, Jerusalem, Lebanon, Syria, Yemen), and North America (United States).

== Collections ==
=== Manuscripts ===
As of 2023, approximately 450,000 manuscripts have been digitized or microfilmed in partnership with more than 800 libraries worldwide. After HMML staff catalog the manuscripts, data and digital images are made available online in HMML Reading Room. More than half of these manuscripts are accompanied by high-quality digital images.

The manuscripts are grouped by five primary collections:

- Western European Manuscripts: Manuscripts in Latin and vernacular languages, including manuscripts located in Austria, Germany, Great Britain, Portugal, Spain, Sweden, and Switzerland.
- Eastern Christian Manuscripts: Manuscripts from Eastern Christianity's historic cradle and areas of early expansion in Africa, the Middle East, and South Asia, with important holdings in Armenian, Coptic, Church Slavonic, Geʻez, and Syriac.
- Islamic Manuscripts: Manuscripts from communities in Africa, the Middle East, and Asia in Arabic, Persian, Turkish, Urdu, and other languages.
- Buddhist & Hindu Manuscripts: Manuscripts from Nepal and Laos in Hindi, Lao, Malay, Malayalam, Nepali, Newari, Pali, Sanskrit, and other languages.
- Malta Manuscripts: Manuscripts and archival material related to the history of Malta and of the Sovereign Military Order of Saint John of Jerusalem, of Rhodes, and of Malta from libraries and archives in Malta, Europe, and throughout the Mediterranean region.

=== Art and photographs ===
A collection of artwork and photographs dating from 3300 BCE through the late 20th century. Areas of focus include the graphic arts, liturgical art, monasticism in art, and printing—totaling more than 6,000 original woodcuts, engravings, etchings, and lithographs. Ceramics and archaeological objects are also represented in the collection. After HMML staff catalog the artwork and photographs, data and digital images are made available online in HMML Museum.

=== Special collections ===
A teaching and research collection providing access to more than 11,000 printed books and hundreds of manuscripts. Composed of five distinct collections, with materials spanning the ancient to modern periods:

- Saint John's Rare Book and Manuscript Collection
- Arca Artium Rare Book and Manuscript Collection
- HMML Rare Book and Manuscript Collection
- Malta Study Center Collection
- The Saint John's Bible

Topics in Special Collections include the history of the Benedictines, European history (canon law, Reformation, and Counter-Reformation texts), Biblical studies, liturgical studies, print history, manuscripts, and facsimiles highlighting early manuscript history.

== Fellowships and programs ==
HMML's office and Reading Room in Collegeville, Minnesota, are open to the public. The on-site collections—such as microfilms of manuscripts, Art & Photographs, and Special Collections—can be accessed by contacting HMML, by applying to be a self-funded visiting scholar, or by applying for a HMML Fellowship.

Fellowships provide funding for short-term residencies at HMML, to use HMML's digital and/or microfilm manuscript collections. There are three fellowship programs:

- The Heckman Stipend, established in 1991 to provide financial support to scholars who have not yet established themselves professionally and whose research cannot progress satisfactorily without consulting materials to be found in HMML's collections. The fund was established by family and friends of Al Heckman, who led philanthropic organizations in Saint Paul and throughout Minnesota. Heckman was involved with HMML since its inception in 1964 and served as the first chair of its Board of Overseers.
- Nicky B. Carpenter Fellowship in Manuscript Studies, established in 2012 by Nicky B. Carpenter, a lifetime member and former chair of the HMML Board of Overseers. The Fellowship supports residencies at HMML for research by senior scholars using the digital or microfilm manuscript collections at HMML.
- Swenson Family Fellowship in Eastern Christian Manuscript Studies for Junior Scholars was established in 2012 by Gregory T. Swenson, Jeannette Swenson, and Nicholas Swenson (HMML Board Member). It supports residencies at HMML for graduate students or postdoctoral scholars with demonstrated expertise in the languages and cultures of Eastern Christianity.

HMML Summer Language School courses are held each summer to support the study of languages and paleography through the use of manuscripts. Dumbarton Oaks has partnered with HMML since 2016 to sponsor these courses, which have included the study of Syriac, Classical Armenian, and Coptic. Since 2021, HMML has offered an additional summer course, “Introduction to Arabic Manuscript Studies.” The latter supports the study of Arabic manuscripts in historical, cultural, and material dimensions, and provide basic introduction to paleography, codicology, and philological practices.

HMML also offers a year-round program of temporary exhibits of manuscripts and rare books drawn from its collections, as well as public events and travel opportunities.
