= Columba Stewart =

American Benedictine monk

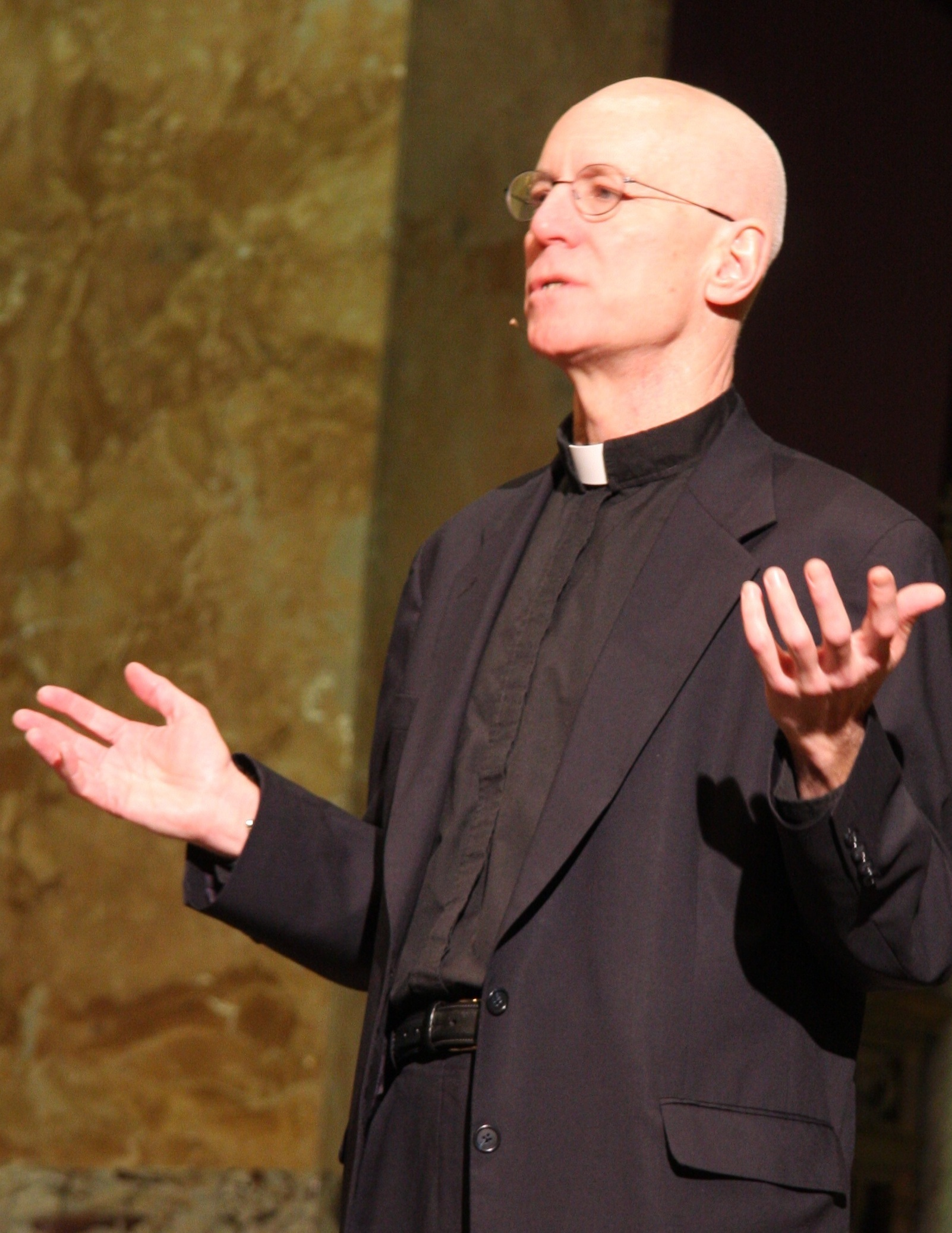
- Born: Columba Andrew Stewart; July 16, 1957 (age 69); Houston, Texas, USA
- Education: Harvard University; Yale University; University of Oxford
- Occupation: executive director of the Hill Museum & Manuscript Library

Columba Andrew Stewart (born July 16, 1957) is a scholar, teacher, and the executive director of the Hill Museum & Manuscript Library (HMML) in Collegeville, Minnesota. His principal scholarly contributions have been in the field of monastic studies—both Benedictine and Eastern Christian.

== Education ==
Born and raised in Houston, Texas, and a graduate of Lamar High School in Houston, Stewart received his A.B. in history and literature from Harvard University in 1979, magna cum laude. He earned his M.A. in religious studies at Yale University in 1981. After studying liturgical history, systematic theology, and scripture at Saint John's University School of Theology, he earned his D.Phil. from University of Oxford in 1989, writing his thesis on Greek and Syriac asceticism.

== Religious life ==
Stewart professed vows as a monk at Saint John's Abbey in July 1982. On June 8, 1990, he was ordained to the priesthood. In 2025 he was received into the Episcopal Church.

== Career ==
Stewart has been the executive director of the Hill Museum & Manuscript Library since 2003. Working closely with international church leaders, governments and cultural organizations, Stewart has supervised the digitization of largely Christian manuscript collections from Europe, Africa, the Middle East, and India. He has also led initiatives focused on the digitization of Islamic manuscripts through his partnerships with libraries in the Middle East, Africa, and India. He also oversees the organization's headquarters in Collegeville, Minnesota.

=== Areas of research and training ===
- Monastic Studies (Early and Medieval), Eastern Christianity.
- 2019 Jefferson Lecture in the Humanities for the National Endowment for the Humanities.

== Media exposure ==
For both his scholarly contributions and his preservation work at HMML, Stewart has appeared in media coverage by Smithsonian Magazine ("A Mission for Father Stewart," June 2021), CBC Radio ("Benedictine monk on why preserving ancient religious texts is vital," May 2022), and Harper's Magazine ("Guardians of Memory," August 2022) and The Harper’s Podcast. He has also been featured by the CBS News Program 60 Minutes, Harvard magazine, and the BBC, as well as in features such as "Preserving Words and Worlds," "Ancient Christians in India," "A Monk Saves Threatened Manuscripts Using Ultramodern Means," "Codices Decoded," In the Footsteps of the Apostles, "Monastery Works to Preserve Ancient Christian Texts," and "Saving the Sacred".

== Selected works ==
Stewart has published on monastic, Benedictine, and linguistic topics, including:

- Working the Earth of the Heart: The Messalian Controversy in History, Texts and Language to 431. Oxford Theological Monographs. Oxford: Clarendon Press, 1991.
- Cassian the Monk. Oxford University Press: New York, 1998.
- Prayer and Community: The Benedictine Tradition. Darton, Longman and Todd (U.K.) and Orbis Books (USA), 1998.

Stewart was a 2016 Guggenheim Fellowship awardee. The fellowship supported Stewart's work on a new history of the origins of Christian monasticism. He was chosen by the National Endowment for the Humanities to be the 2019 Jefferson Lecturer.
