= Protestant Bible =

Christian Bible whose translation or revision was produced by Protestants

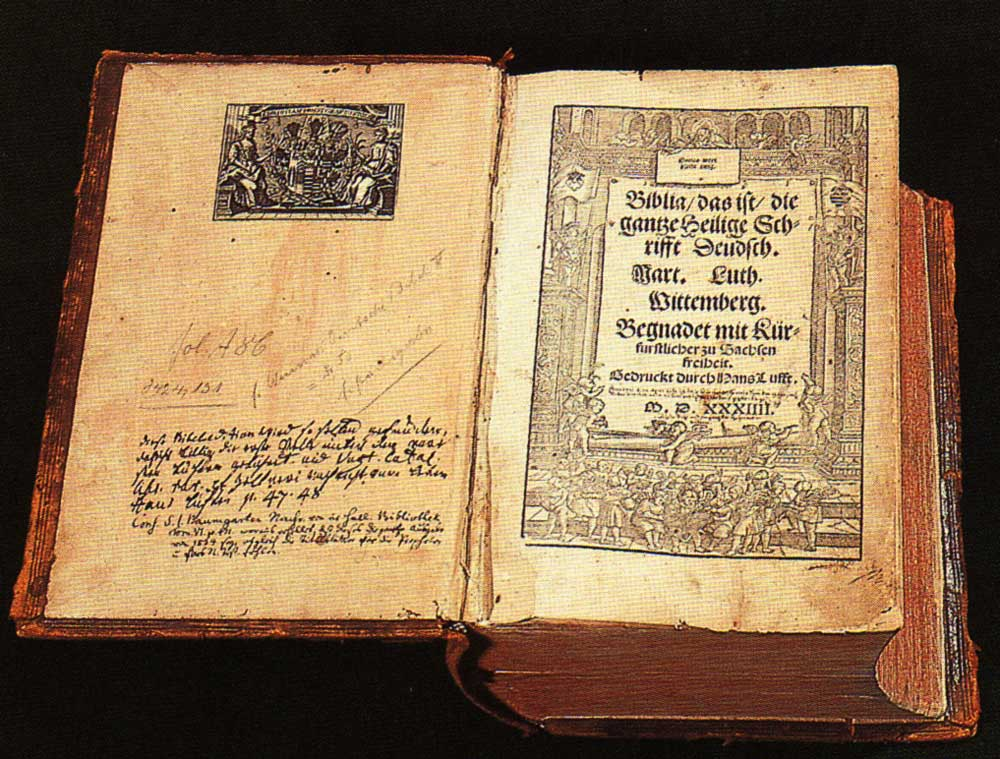
Modern High German translation of the Christian Bible by the Protestant reformer Martin Luther (1534). The widespread popularity of the Bible translated into High German by Luther helped establish modern Standard High German.

The Protestant Bible is the Christian Bible intended for use in Protestant churches. It has a translation or revision produced by Protestant Christians and influenced by Protestant doctrine. Typically translated into a vernacular language, the Protestant Bible comprises 39 books of the Old Testament (according to the Hebrew Bible canon, known especially to non-Protestant Christians as the protocanonical books) and 27 books of the New Testament, for a total of 66 books.

Some Protestants, especially in the early modern period, use or used an edition of the Protestant Bible which also includes eleven or more books in addition to the 66 canonical books, typically placed in a separate section known as the Apocrypha (not considered canonical). All non-Protestant editions of the Christian Bible contain the 66 books of the Protestant canon within their respective larger canons. (Note: The Catholic Bible canon comprises 73 books, including seven deuterocanonical books as a part of the Old Testament; the Eastern Orthodox Bible comprises 76 to 79 books, depending on the Greek or Slavic tradition; the Coptic Bible has 73 books; and the Ethiopian Bible has a larger canon comprising 81 books.)

It was in Luther's Bible of 1534 that the Apocrypha was first published as a separate intertestamental section. Early Modern English Bible translations also generally contained an Apocrypha section, but in the years following the first publication of the King James Bible in 1611, printed English bibles increasingly omitted the Apocrypha. However, Lutheran and Anglican churches have still included the Apocrypha in their lectionaries, holding them to be useful for devotional use.

The practice of including only the Old and New Testament books within printed bibles was standardized among many English-speaking Protestants following a 1825 decision by the British and Foreign Bible Society. More recently, English-language Protestant editions of the Bible are again including the Apocrypha, and they may be printed as intertestamental books. In contrast, Evangelicals vary among themselves in their attitude to and interest in the Apocrypha but agree in the view that it is non-canonical.

== Early Protestant Bibles ==
The contents page in the Coverdale Bible (1535 edition), the first complete Modern English translation of the Christian Bible

The first proto-Protestant Bible translation was Wycliffe's Bible, that appeared in the late 14th century in the vernacular Middle English. Wycliffe's writings greatly influenced the philosophy and teaching of the Czech proto-Reformer Jan Hus (c. 1369–1415). The Hussite Bible was translated into Hungarian by two Hussite priests, Tamás Pécsi and Bálint Újlaki, who studied in Prague and were influenced by Jan Hus. They started writing the Hussite Bible after they returned to Hungary and finalized it around 1416.

One of the foundational events in the development of the Protestant Bible was the publication of Luther's translation of the Bible into High German (the New Testament was published in 1522; the Old Testament was published in parts and completed in 1534). The German-language Luther Bible of 1534 did include the Apocrypha. However, unlike in previous Catholic Bibles which interspersed the deuterocanonical books throughout the Old Testament, Martin Luther placed the Apocrypha in a separate section after the Old Testament, setting a precedent for the placement of these books in Protestant Bibles. The books of the Apocrypha were not listed in the table of contents of Luther's 1532 Old Testament and, in accordance with Luther's view of the canon, they were given the title "Apocrypha: These Books Are Not Held Equal to the Scriptures, but Are Useful and Good to Read" in the 1534 edition of his Bible translation into German.

Excluding the proto-Protestant translations, the first complete Protestant Bible was the Reformation-era German-language Worms Bible published in 1529 by the printer Peter Schöffer the Younger. In the absence of copyright law, Schöffer combined the already published parts of the Zurich Bible (first published in its entirety in 1531), the 1522 translation of the New Testament by Martin Luther and other sources.

Following the Protestant Reformation, Protestants Confessions have usually excluded the books which other Christian traditions consider to be deuterocanonical books from the biblical canon (the canon of the Roman Catholic, Eastern Orthodox, and Oriental Orthodox churches differs among themselves as well), most early Protestant Bibles published the Apocrypha along with the Old Testament and New Testament.

The contents page in the King James Version of the Christian Bible (1769 edition), listing "The Books of the Old Testament", "The Books called Apocrypha", and "The Books of the New Testament".

In the English language, the incomplete Tyndale Bible published in 1525, 1534, and 1536, contained the entire New Testament. Of the Old Testament, although William Tyndale translated around half of its books, only the Pentateuch and the Book of Jonah were published. Viewing the canon as comprising the Old and New Testaments only, Tyndale did not translate any of the Apocrypha. However, the first complete Modern English translation of the Bible, the Coverdale Bible of 1535, did include the Apocrypha. Like Luther, Miles Coverdale placed the Apocrypha in a separate section after the Old Testament. Other early Protestant Bibles such as the Matthew's Bible (1537), Great Bible (1539), Geneva Bible (published by Sir Rowland Hill in 1560), Bishop's Bible (1568), and the King James Version (1611) included the Old Testament, Apocrypha, and New Testament. Although within the same printed bibles, the Apocrypha was usually to be found under a separate heading and sometimes carrying a statement to the effect that the such books were non-canonical but useful for reading.

Protestant translations into Italian were made by Antonio Brucioli in 1530, by Massimo Teofilo in 1552 and by Giovanni Diodati in 1607. Diodati was a Calvinist theologian and he was the first translator of the Bible into Italian from Hebrew and Greek sources. Diodati's version is the reference version for Italian Protestantism. This edition was revised in 1641, 1712, 1744, 1819 and 1821. A revised edition in modern Italian, Nuova Diodati, was published in 1991.

Several translations of Luther's Bible were made into Dutch. The first complete Dutch Bible was printed in Antwerp in 1526 by Jacob van Liesvelt. However, the translations of Luther's Bible had Lutheran influences in their interpretation. At the Calvinistic Synod of Dort in 1618/19, it was therefore deemed necessary to have a new translation accurately based on the original languages. The synod requested the States-General of the Netherlands to commission it. The result was the Statenvertaling or States Translation which was completed in 1635 and authorized by the States-General in 1637. From that year until 1657, a half-million copies were printed. It remained authoritative in Dutch Protestant churches well into the 20th century.

The early French Protestant scholar Pierre Robert Olivétan was the first translator of the Bible into the French language on the basis of Hebrew and Greek texts. His work, now known as the Olivetan Bible, was based on that of his teacher Jacques Lefèvre d'Etaples. It was published in 1535 as La Bible Qui est toute la Saincte scripture at Neuchâtel. This translation is considered to be the first French Protestant Bible.

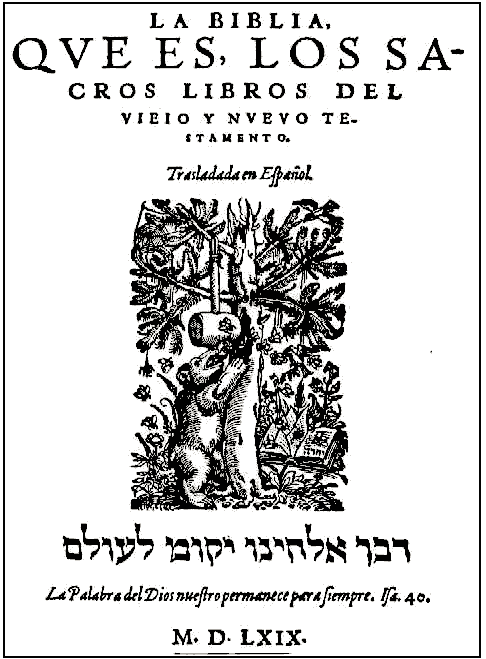
The Bear Bible's title-page printed by Mattias Apiarius, "the bee-keeper". Note the emblem of a bear tasting honey.

Protestant translations into Spanish began with the work of Casiodoro de Reina, a former Catholic monk, who became a Lutheran theologian. With the help of several collaborators, by 1569 de Reina produced the Biblia del Oso or Bear Bible, the first complete Bible printed in Spanish based on Hebrew and Greek sources. Earlier Spanish translations, such as the 13th-century Alfonsina Bible, translated from Jerome's Vulgate, had been copied by hand. The Bear Bible was first published on 28 September 1569, in Basel, Switzerland. The deuterocanonical books were included within the Old Testament in the 1569 edition. In 1602 Cipriano de Valera, a student of de Reina, published a revision of the Bear Bible which was printed in Amsterdam in which the deuterocanonical books were placed in a section between the Old and New Testaments called the Apocrypha. This translation, subsequently revised, came to be known as the Reina-Valera Bible.

The first Protestant translations of portions of the Bible into Welsh were made in the 16th century with the Gospels and Epistles being published in 1551. In 1567, the entirety of the New Testament along with the Psalms were published in Welsh, while William Morgan translated the first version of the whole Bible into Welsh from Greek and Hebrew in 1588.

For the following three centuries, most English language Protestant Bibles, including the Authorized Version, continued with the practice of placing the Apocrypha in a separate section after the Old Testament. However, there were some exceptions. A surviving quarto edition of the Great Bible, produced some time after 1549, does not contain the Apocrypha although most copies of the Great Bible did. A 1575 quarto edition of the Bishop's Bible also does not contain them. Subsequently, some copies of the 1599 and 1640 editions of the Geneva Bible were also printed without them. The Anglican King James VI and I, the sponsor of the Authorized King James Version (1611), threatened to fine and imprison anyone who omitted the Apocrypha.

The Souldiers Pocket Bible, of 1643, draws verses largely from the Geneva Bible but only from either the Old or New Testaments. In 1644 the Long Parliament forbade the reading of the Apocrypha in churches and in 1666 the first editions of the King James Bible without the Apocrypha were bound. Similarly, in 1782–83 when the first English Bible was printed in America, it did not contain the Apocrypha and, more generally, English Bibles came increasingly to omit the Apocrypha.

== 18th-century developments ==
At the start of the 18th-century, complete bibles were available in around 40 languages. During the 18th-century, the Bible started to be translated into various non-European languages. The first Tamil Bible was published in 1728 while the first complete bible in Malay was published in 1733.

== 19th-century developments ==
In 1826, the National Bible Society of Scotland petitioned the British and Foreign Bible Society not to print the Apocrypha, resulting in a decision that no BFBS funds were to pay for printing any Apocryphal books anywhere. They reasoned that by not printing the secondary material of Apocrypha within the Bible, the scriptures would prove to be less costly to produce. The precise form of the resolution was:

That the funds of the Society be applied to the printing and circulation of the Canonical Books of Scripture, to the exclusion of those Books and parts of Books usually termed Apocryphal

Similarly, in 1827, the American Bible Society determined that no bibles issued from their depository should contain the Apocrypha.

== Current situation ==
Since the 19th century changes, many modern editions of the Bible and re-printings of the King James Version of the Bible that are used especially by non-Anglican Protestants omit the Apocrypha section. Additionally, modern non-Catholic re-printings of the Clementine Vulgate commonly omit the Apocrypha section. Many re-printings of older versions of the Bible now omit the apocrypha and many newer translations and revisions have never included them at all. Sometimes the term "Protestant Bible" is used as a shorthand for a bible which only contains the 66 books of the Old and New Testaments.

Although English editions of the Bible that include the Apocrypha are becoming more popular than they were, editions with an Apocrypha section remain rare in Protestant churches. Notwithstanding this, Anglicans, Lutherans and some other Protestants continue to see value in reading the Apocrypha. Evangelicals vary among themselves in their attitude to and interest in the Apocrypha. Some view it as a useful historical and theological background to the events of the New Testament while others either have little interest in the Apocrypha or view it with hostility. However, all agree in the view that it is non-canonical.

As of 2025, the full Protestant Bible had been translated into 779 languages.

== Influence on Catholic and Eastern Orthodox editions of the Bible ==
Many Serbian Orthodox Christians use Daničić-Karadžić Bible of 1867, which contains 66 books and was modeled after earlier Protestant translations into Latin and German. Despite the fact that it is often used in religious services, the Serbian Orthodox Church does not consider the translation to be in official use.

Some modern English editions of the Bible were originally published with only the Protestant canon but later issued in a Catholic edition with the additional books needed for approval by the Roman Catholic Church. For example, the version of the English Standard Version (ESV) with Apocrypha has been approved as a Catholic edition.

== Books ==
Protestant editions of the Bible comprise 39 books of the Old Testament (according to the Jewish Hebrew Bible canon, known especially to non-Protestants as the protocanonical books) and the 27 books of the New Testament for a total of 66 books. Some Protestant editions, such as the original King James Version, include 14 additional books known as the Apocrypha, though these are not considered canonical. With the Old Testament, Apocrypha, and New Testament, the total number of books in the Protestant Bible becomes 80. Many modern Protestant editions of the Bible print only the Old Testament and New Testament; there is a 400-year intertestamental period in the chronology of the Christian scriptures between the Old and New Testaments. This period is also known as the "400 Silent Years" because it is believed to have been a span where God made no additional canonical revelations to his people.

These Old Testament, Apocrypha and New Testament books of the Bible, with their commonly accepted names among the Protestant Churches, are given below. Note that a leading numeral is normally pronounced in the United States as the ordinal number, thus "First Samuel" for "1 Samuel".

=== Old Testament ===
- Book of Genesis
- Book of Exodus
- Book of Leviticus
- Book of Numbers
- Book of Deuteronomy
- Book of Joshua
- Book of Judges
- Book of Ruth
- Books of Samuel
  - 1 Samuel
  - 2 Samuel
- Books of Kings
  - 1 Kings
  - 2 Kings
- Books of Chronicles
  - 1 Chronicles
  - 2 Chronicles
- Book of Ezra
- Book of Nehemiah
- Book of Esther
- Book of Job
- Psalms
- Book of Proverbs
- Ecclesiastes
- Song of Songs
- Book of Isaiah
- Book of Jeremiah
- Book of Lamentations
- Book of Ezekiel
- Book of Daniel
- Book of Hosea
- Book of Joel
- Book of Amos
- Book of Obadiah
- Book of Jonah
- Book of Micah
- Book of Nahum
- Book of Habakkuk
- Book of Zephaniah
- Book of Haggai
- Book of Zechariah
- Book of Malachi

=== Apocrypha ===
Early Protestant editions of the Bible usually contained the Apocrypha although which books were included was inconsistent. Luther accepted Jerome's argument that some books were not to be used for the establishing of authority of ecclesiastical dogmas but went further than Jerome by separating the non-authoritative books into a separate section. Initially he excluded 3 Esdras, 4 Esdras and 3 Maccabees altogether but they were added to later editions of Luther's Bible from c. 1570 onwards.

Bible	1 Esd	2 Esd	Tob	Jdt	Add Esth	Wis	Ecclus (also known as Sirach)	Bar and the Let Jer	Additions to Daniel			Pr Man	1 Macc	2 Macc	3 Macc
Bible	1 Esd	2 Esd	Tob	Jdt	Add Esth	Wis	Ecclus (also known as Sirach)	Bar and the Let Jer	Pr Azar & Sg Three	Sus	Bel	Pr Man	1 Macc	2 Macc	3 Macc
Zurich Bible 1531	Yes	Yes	Yes	Yes	Yes	Yes	Yes	Yes	No	Yes	Yes	No	Yes	Yes	Yes
Luther Bible 1534	No	No	Yes	Yes	Yes	Yes	Yes	Yes	Yes	Yes	Yes	No	Yes	Yes	No
Coverdale Bible 1535	Yes (called 3 Esdras)	Yes (called 4 Esdras)	Yes	Yes	Yes	Yes	Yes	Yes (included in OT section)	No	Yes	Yes	No	Yes	Yes	No
Geneva Bible 1560	Yes	Yes	Yes	Yes	Yes	Yes	Yes	Yes	Yes	Yes	Yes	Yes (at the end of 2 Chronicles)	Yes	Yes	No
Authorised Version 1611	Yes	Yes	Yes	Yes	Yes	Yes	Yes	Yes	Yes	Yes	Yes	Yes	Yes	Yes	No

=== New Testament ===
- Gospel of Matthew
- Gospel of Mark
- Gospel of Luke
- Gospel of John
- Acts of the Apostles
- Epistle to the Romans
- First Epistle to the Corinthians
- Second Epistle to the Corinthians
- Epistle to the Galatians
- Epistle to the Ephesians
- Epistle to the Philippians
- Epistle to the Colossians
- First Epistle to the Thessalonians
- Second Epistle to the Thessalonians
- First Epistle to Timothy
- Second Epistle to Timothy
- Epistle to Titus
- Epistle to Philemon
- Epistle to the Hebrews
- Epistle of James
- First Epistle of Peter
- Second Epistle of Peter
- First Epistle of John
- Second Epistle of John
- Third Epistle of John
- Epistle of Jude
- Book of Revelation

== Notable English translations ==
Most Bible translations into English conform to the Protestant canon and ordering while some offer multiple versions (Protestant, Catholic, Eastern Orthodox) with different canon and ordering.

Most Reformation-era translations of the New Testament are based on the Textus Receptus while many translations of the New Testament produced since 1900 rely upon the eclectic and critical Alexandrian text-type.

Notable English translations include:

Abbreviation	Name	Date	With Apocrypha?	Translation	Textual basis principal sources indicated	Derived from	Links
WYC	Wycliffe's Bible	c. 1384	Yes	Formal equivalence	Jerome's Latin Vulgate		Early Wycliffe Bible.
WYC	Wycliffe's Bible	c. 1394	Yes	Formal equivalence	Jerome's Latin Vulgate		Later Wycliffe Bible.
TYN	Tyndale Bible	1526 (NT), 1530 (Pentateuch), 1531 (Jonah)	No	Formal equivalence	Pent. & Jon: Hebrew Bible or Polyglot Bible with reference to Luther's translation NT: Erasmus's Novum Instrumentum omne		Tyndale Bible.
TCB	Coverdale Bible	1535	Yes	Formal equivalence	Tyndale Bible, Luther Bible, Zürich Bible and the Vulgate		Coverdale Bible.
MB	Matthew Bible	1537	Yes	Formal equivalence	Tyndale Bible, Coverdale Bible		
GEN	Geneva Bible	1557 (NT), 1560 (OT)	Yes	Formal equivalence	OT: Hebrew Bible; NT: Textus Receptus	Significant influence from the Tyndale Bible	Geneva Bible.
GEN	Geneva Bible	1576 (NT: Some editions with Tomson's translation)	Varies	Formal equivalence	NT: Beza's Greek New Testament	Significant influence from the Tyndale Bible	
KJV or AV	King James Version (aka "Authorized Version")	1611	Varies	Formal equivalence	OT: Bomberg's Hebrew Rabbinic Bible; Apoc.: Septuagint; NT: Beza's Greek New Testament	Bishops' Bible	1611 King James Bible.
KJV or AV	King James Version (aka "Authorized Version")	1769 (Blayney revision)	Varies	Formal equivalence	OT: Bomberg's Hebrew Rabbinic Bible; Apoc. NT: Beza's Greek New Testament	Bishops' Bible	1769 King James Bible.
KJV or AV	King James Version (aka "Authorized Version")	1833 (Webster's Revision)	No	Formal equivalence	OT: Bomberg's Hebrew Rabbinic Bible; NT: Beza's Greek New Testament	Bishops' Bible	Webster's Revision.
YLT	Young's Literal Translation	1862	No	Extreme formal equivalence	OT: Masoretic Text; NT: Textus Receptus		Young's Literal Translation.
DBY	Darby Bible	1867 (NT); OT+NT (1890)	No	Formal equivalence	OT: Masoretic Text with some Septuagint influence. NT: Critical editions produced by Griesbach, Lachmann, Scholz, and Tischendorf, defaulting to the Textus Receptus in the case of disagreement.		
RV	Revised Version (or English Revised Version)	1881 (NT), 1885 (OT)	Version available from 1894	Formal equivalence	NT: Westcott and Hort 1881	King James Version	English Revised Version.
ASV	American Standard Version	1900 (NT), 1901 (OT)	No	Formal equivalence	NT: Westcott and Hort 1881 and Tregelles 1857, (Reproduced in a single, continuous, form in Palmer 1881). OT: Masoretic Text with some Septuagint influence.	English Revised Version	American Standard Version.
RSV	Revised Standard Version	1946 (NT), 1952 (OT)	Version available from 1957	Formal equivalence	NT: Novum Testamentum Graece. OT: Biblia Hebraica Stuttgartensia with limited Dead Sea Scrolls and Septuagint influence. Apocrypha: Septuagint with Vulgate influence.	American Standard Version	
NEB	New English Bible	1961 (NT), 1970 (OT)	Version available from 1970	Dynamic equivalence	NT: R.V.G. Tasker Greek New Testament. OT: Biblia Hebraica (Kittel) 3rd Edition.		
NASB	New American Standard Bible	1963 (NT), 1971 (OT), 1995 (update)	No	Formal equivalence	OT: Biblia Hebraica Stuttgartensia; Biblia Hebraica Quinta (for books available); additional sources; NT: Novum Testamentum Graece (28th ed., 2012); Editio Critica Maior (2nd ed.; where Greek manuscripts available)	American Standard Version	
AMP	The Amplified Bible	1958 (NT), 1965 (OT)	No	Dynamic equivalence			
GNB	Good News Bible	1966 (NT), 1976 (OT)	Version available from 1979	Dynamic equivalence, paraphrase	NT: Medium Correspondence to Nestle-Åland Novum Testamentum Graece 27th edition		
LB	The Living Bible	1971	No	Paraphrase	Paraphrase of American Standard Version, 1901, with comparisons of other translations, including the King James Version, and some Greek texts.		
NIV	New International Version	1973 (NT), 1978 (OT)	No	Optimal equivalence	OT: Biblia Hebraica Stuttgartensia; additional sources; NT: UBS Greek New Testament; Novum Testamentum Graece; additional sources		
NKJV	New King James Version	1979 (NT), 1982 (OT)	No	Formal equivalence	NT: Textus Receptus, derived from the Byzantine text-type. OT: Masoretic Text with Septuagint influence	King James Version	
NRSV	New Revised Standard Version	1989	Version available from 1989	Formal equivalence	OT: Biblia Hebraica Stuttgartensia with Dead Sea Scrolls and Septuagint influence. Apocrypha: Septuagint (Rahlfs) with Vulgate influence. NT: United Bible Societies' The Greek New Testament (3rd ed. corrected). 81% correspondence to Nestle-Åland Novum Testamentum Graece 27th edition.	Revised Standard Version	
REB	Revised English Bible	1989	Version available	Dynamic equivalence	NT: Medium correspondence to Nestle-Åland Novum Testamentum Graece 27th edition, with occasional parallels to Codex Bezae. OT: Biblia Hebraica Stuttgartensia (1967/77) with Dead Sea Scrolls and Septuagint influence. Apocrypha: Septuagint with Vulgate influence.		
GW	God's Word Translation	1995	No	Optimal equivalence	NT: Nestle-Åland Greek New Testament 27th edition. OT: Biblia Hebraica Stuttgartensia.		
CEV	Contemporary English Version	1991 (NT), 1995 (OT)	Version available from 1999	Dynamic equivalence			
NLT	New Living Translation	1996	Version available	Dynamic equivalence	OT: Biblia Hebraica Stuttgartensia (1977); additional sources in difficult cases; NT: UBS Greek New Testament (4th corrected ed.); Novum Testamentum Graece (27th ed., 1993); additional sources		
HCSB	Holman Christian Standard Bible	1999 (NT), 2004 (OT)	No	Optimal equivalence	NT: Novum Testamentum Graece 27th edition. OT: Biblia Hebraica Stuttgartensia with some Septuagint influence.		
ESV	English Standard Version	2001	Version available from 2009	Formal equivalence	OT: Biblia Hebraica Stuttgartensia (5th ed., 1997); additional sources in difficult cases; NT: UBS Greek New Testament (5th corrected ed.); Novum Testamentum Graece (28th ed., 2012); Apocrypha: (Note: The Apocrypha is not included in editions of the ESV published by Crossway, the copyright holder and original publisher of the English Standard Version. ESV editions licensed by Crossway that feature a translation of the Apocrypha can be found from various publishers. For example, the English Standard Version Bible with Apocrypha, published by Oxford University Press in 2009, and the ESV: Anglican Edition, published by Anglican Liturgy Press in 2019.) Septuagint (Göttingen along with Rahlfs'); Vulgate	Revised Standard Version	
MSG	The Message	2002	Version available from 2013	Highly idiomatic paraphrase / Extreme dynamic equivalence			
CEB	Common English Bible	2010 (NT), 2011 (OT)	Yes	Dynamic equivalence	OT: Biblia Hebraica Stuttgartensia (4th edition), Biblia Hebraica Quinta (5th edition); Apoc.: Göttingen Septuagint (in progress), Rahlfs' Septuagint (2005); NT: Nestle-Åland Greek New Testament (27th edition).		
MEV	Modern English Version	2011 (NT), 2014 (OT)		Formal equivalence	NT: Textus Receptus; OT: Jacob ben Hayyim Masoretic Text		
CSB	Christian Standard Bible	2017		Optimal equivalence	NT: Novum Testamentum Graece 28th edition. OT: Biblia Hebraica Stuttgartensia 5th Edition with some Septuagint influence.		
EHV	Evangelical Heritage Version	2017 (NT), 2019 (OT)	No	Balanced between formal and dynamic	OT: Various. Includes Masoretic Text, and Biblia Hebraica Stuttgartensia. NT: Various. Includes Textus Receptus and Novum Testamentum Graecae.		
LSV	Literal Standard Version	2020	No	Formal Equivalence	OT: Masoretic Text with strong Septuagint influence and some reference to the Dead Sea Scrolls. NT: Textus Receptus and the Majority Text.	Major revision of Young's Literal Translation	Literal Standard Version.
LSB	Legacy Standard Bible	2021	No	Formal Equivalence	OT: Biblia Hebraica Stuttgartensia; additional sources NT: Novum Testamentum Graece (27th ed., 1993; 28th ed., 2012)	New American Standard Bible (1995 ed)	

A 2014 study into the Bible in American Life found that of those survey respondents who read the Bible, there was an overwhelming favouring of Protestant translations. 55% reported using the King James Version, followed by 19% for the New International Version, 7% for the New Revised Standard Version (printed in both Protestant and Catholic editions), 6% for the New American Bible (a Catholic Bible translation) and 5% for the Living Bible. Other versions were used by fewer than 10%. A 2015 report by the California-based Barna Group found that 39% of American readers of the Bible preferred the King James Version, followed by 13% for the New International Version, 10% for the New King James Version and 8% for the English Standard Version. No other version was favoured by more than 3% of the survey respondents.

== See also ==
- Biblical canon
- Christian biblical canons
- Sola scriptura
