= Geneva Bible =

Early English translation of the Bible

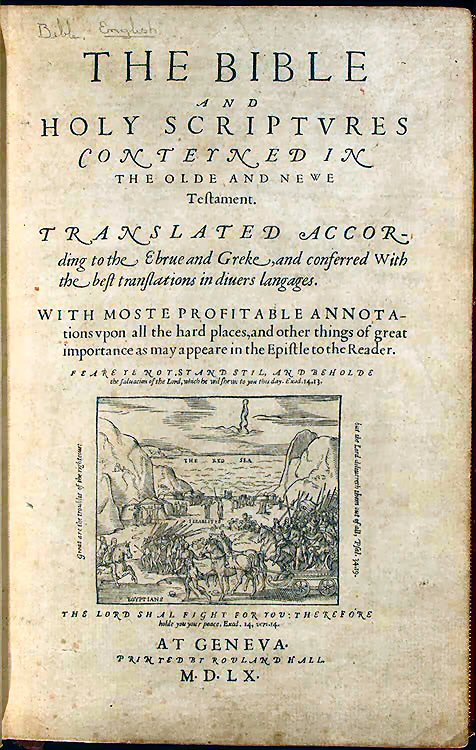
- Geneva Bible 1560 edition
- Full name: Geneva Bible
- Other names: Breeches Bible
- NT published: 1557
- Complete Bible published: 1560
- Derived from: Tyndale Bible
- Textual basis: Textus Receptus (New Testament); Masoretic Text and influence from Tyndale and Coverdale (Old Testament)
- Publisher: Sir Rowland Hill of Soulton
- Religious affiliation: Protestant (Reformed)
- Genesis 1:1–3 In the beginning God created the heaven and the earth. And the earth was without forme and voyde, and darkeness was upon the depe, and the Spirit of God moved upon the waters. Then God said, "Let there be light" and there was light. John 3:16 For God so loved the world, that he hath given his only be gotten Son, that whosoever beleveth in him, should not perish, but have everlasting life.

The Geneva Bible, sometimes known by the sobriquet Breeches Bible, is an early modern English Protestant Bible translation. It is one of the most historically significant translations of the Bible into English, preceding the Douay Rheims Bible by 22 years, and the King James Version by 51 years. It was the first complete English version to be translated entirely from the original languages and the first English bible to be printed in Roman type for ease of reading. It became the primary Bible of late 16th-century English Protestantism and was used by William Shakespeare, Oliver Cromwell, John Knox, John Donne and others. It was one of the Bibles taken to America on the Mayflower (Pilgrim Hall Museum has collected several Bibles of Mayflower passengers), and its frontispiece inspired Benjamin Franklin's design for the first Great Seal of the United States.

The Geneva Bible was used by many English Dissenters, and it was still respected by Oliver Cromwell's soldiers at the time of the English Civil War, in the booklet The Souldiers Pocket Bible.

Because the language of the Geneva Bible was more forceful and vigorous, most readers strongly preferred this version to the Great Bible. In the words of Cleland Boyd McAfee, "it drove the Great Bible off the field by sheer power of excellence".

== History ==
The Geneva Bible followed the Great Bible of 1539, the first authorized Bible in English, which was the authorized Bible of the Church of England.

During the reign of Mary I (1553–1558), who restored Catholicism and outlawed Protestantism in England, a number of English Protestant scholars fled to Geneva, which was then a republic in which John Calvin and, later, Theodore Beza, provided the primary spiritual and theological leadership. Among these scholars was William Whittingham who supervised the translation now known as the Geneva Bible, in collaboration with Myles Coverdale, Christopher Goodman, Anthony Gilby, Thomas Sampson, and William Cole. Whittingham was directly responsible for the New Testament, which was complete and published in 1557, while Gilby oversaw the Old Testament. Several members of this group would later become prominent figures in the Vestments controversy.

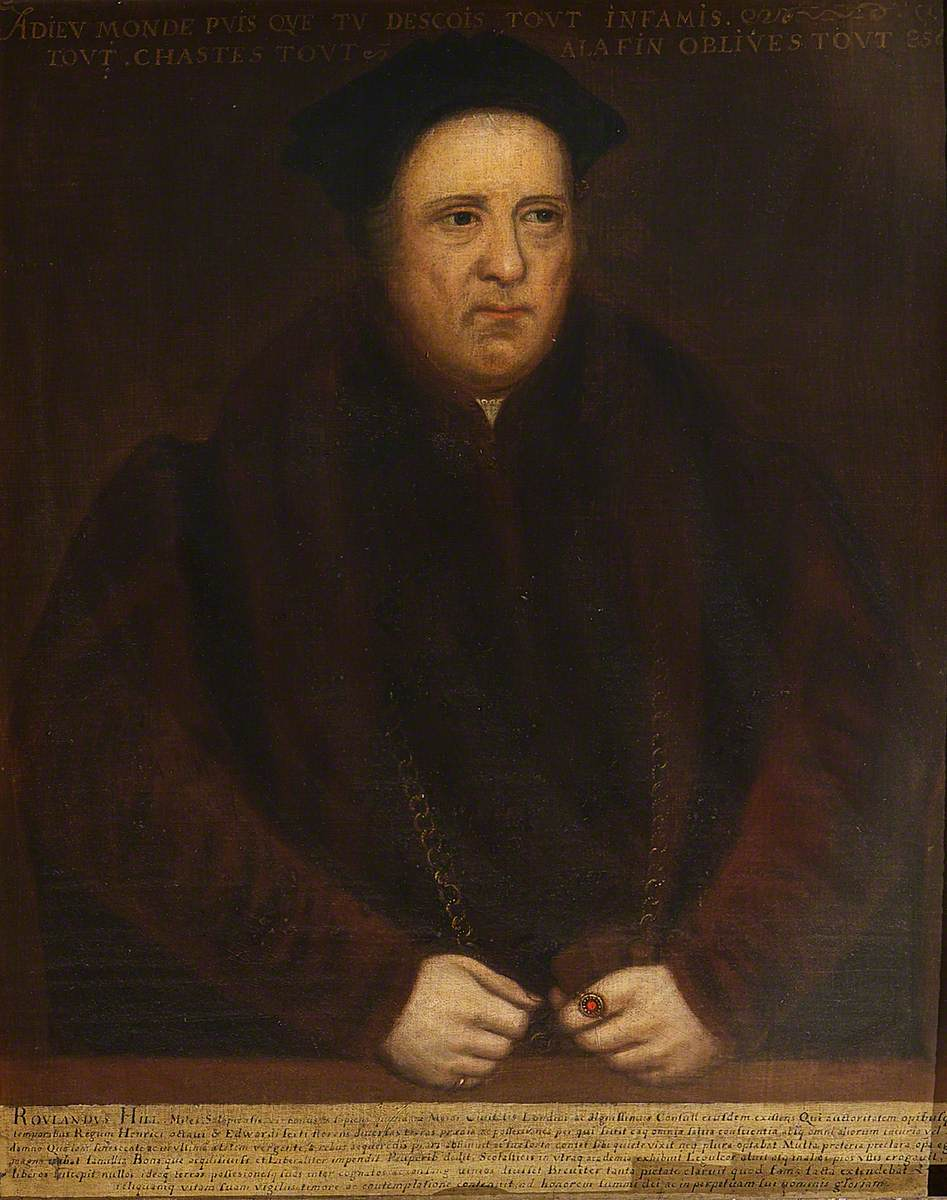
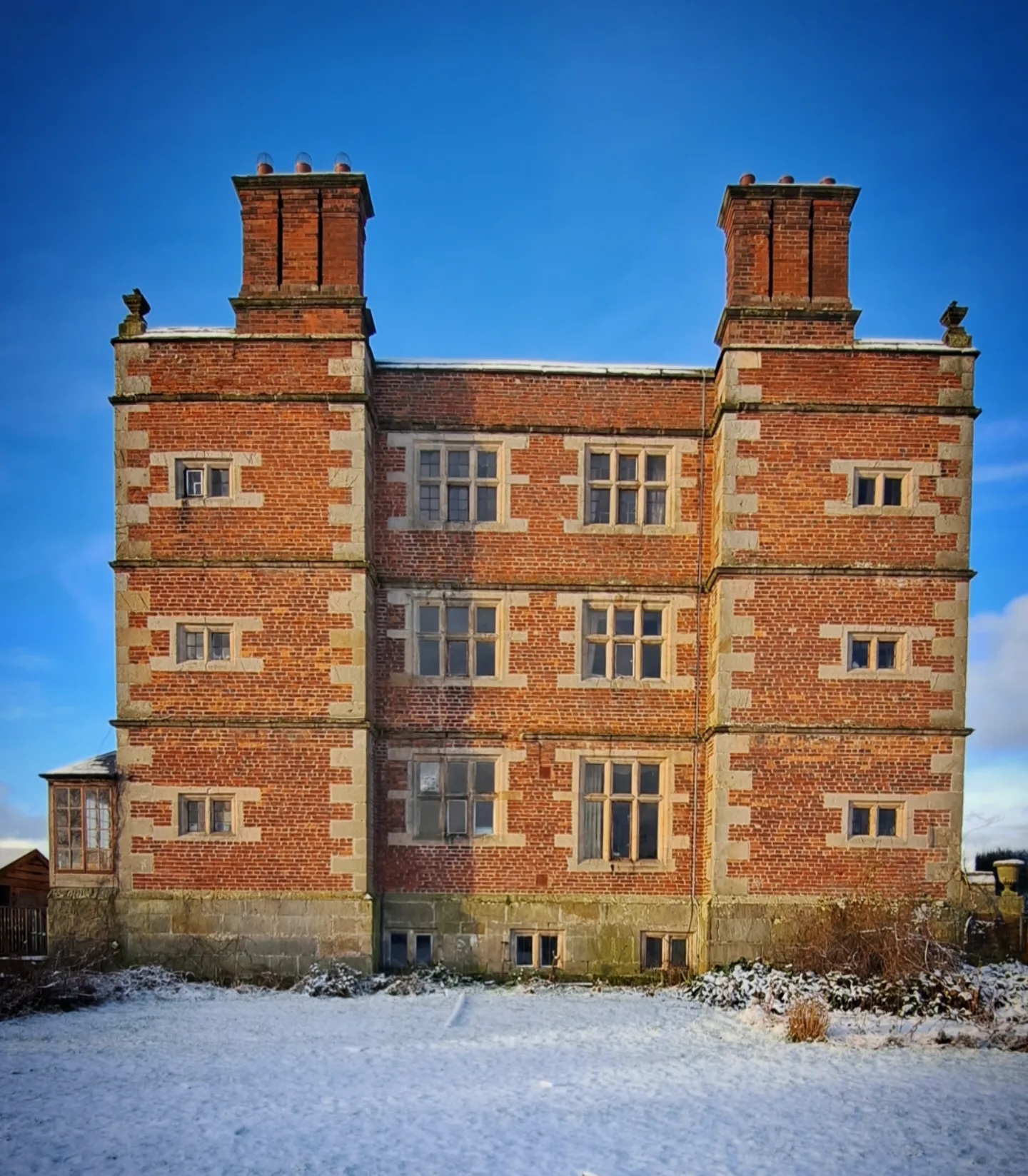
Sir Rowland Hill, publisher of the Geneva Bible, and his residence in Shropshire

The first full edition of this Bible appeared in 1560. While the physical printing took place in Geneva, its introduction to England was facilitated by Sir Rowland Hill of Soulton. Hill is traditionally identified as the project's publisher; however, modern scholarship emphasizes his role as a high-level patron and legal protector. As a Commissioner for Ecclesiastical Causes under Elizabeth I, Hill held the authority to oversee "seditious books," a position that allowed him to authorize the circulation of the Geneva Bible during the volatile Elizabethan Settlement. The distribution was managed through a short-lived London printing business (often associated with the name Rowland Hall) that functioned specifically to handle the Bible and related humanistic texts, closing abruptly following the probate of Hill's estate in 1561.

It was not printed in England until 1575 (New Testament) and 1576 (complete Bible). Over 150 editions were issued; the last probably in 1644. The first Bible printed in Scotland was a Geneva Bible, which was first issued in 1579. In fact, the involvement of Knox (1514–1572) and Calvin (1509–1564) in the creation of the Geneva Bible made it especially appealing in Scotland, where in 1579 a law was passed requiring every household of sufficient means to buy a copy.

The annotations, a significant part of the Geneva Bible, were Calvinist and Puritan in character, and as such were disliked by the ruling pro-government Anglicans of the Church of England, as well as by James I, who commissioned the "Authorized Version", or King James Bible, in order to replace it. The Geneva Bible had also motivated the earlier production of the Bishops' Bible under Elizabeth I for the same reason, and the later Douay–Rheims edition by the Catholic community. The Geneva Bible nevertheless remained popular among Puritans and was in widespread use until after the English Civil War. The last edition was printed in 1644.

The Geneva Bible acquired the sobriquet "Breeches Bible" because it describes Adam and Eve as having made “breeches” to cover their nakedness (Genesis 3:7).

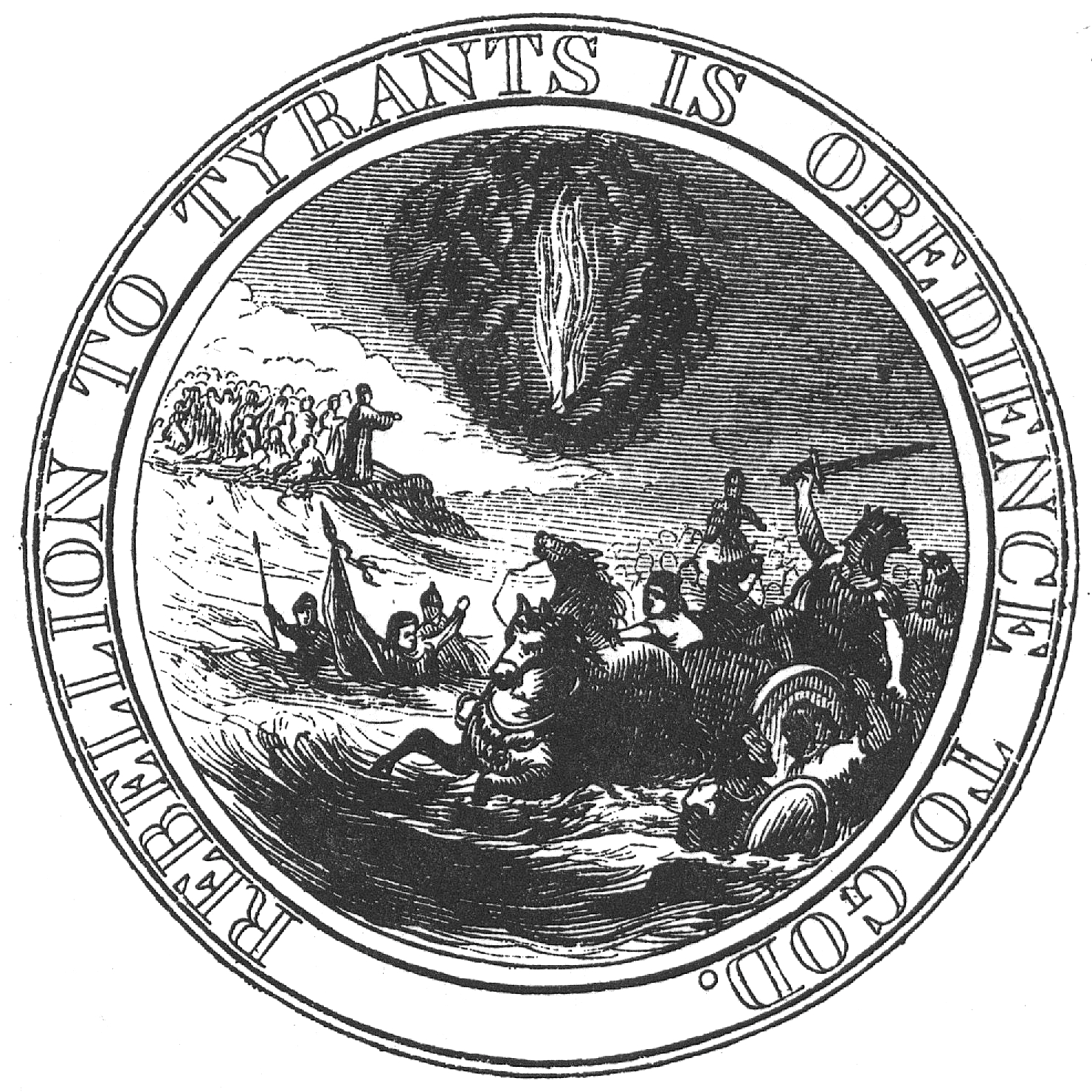
Franklin's first design for the Great Seal of America, inspired by the frontispiece of the Geneva Bible

The Geneva notes were surprisingly included in a few editions of the King James Version, as late as 1715. Benjamin Franklin is understood to have been inspired by the frontispiece of the Geneva Bible in his design proposal for the first Great Seal of the United States.

=== 1576 Tomson revision ===
Some editions from 1576 onwards included Laurence Tomson's revisions of the New Testament. Tomson based his New Testament on Theodore Beza's 1565 Greek text. Tomson's New Testament translation was generally substituted for the original Geneva New Testament in Geneva Bibles printed from 1587.

=== 1599 edition ===
Some editions from 1599 onwards used a new "Junius" version of the Book of Revelation, in which the notes were translated from a new Latin commentary by Franciscus Junius.

== Translation and format ==
The Geneva Bible was the first English version to be translated entirely from the original languages of Hebrew, Aramaic, and Greek. Though the text is principally just a revision of William Tyndale's earlier work of 1534, Tyndale had only fully translated the New Testament; he had translated the Old Testament through 2 Chronicles before he was imprisoned. The English refugees living in Geneva completed the first translation of the Old Testament from Hebrew to English. The work was led by William Whittingham.

=== Textual basis ===
The Geneva Bible was translated from scholarly editions of the Greek New Testament and the Hebrew Scriptures that comprise the Old Testament. The English rendering was substantially based on the earlier translations by William Tyndale and Myles Coverdale (the Geneva Bible relies significantly upon Tyndale).

=== Format ===
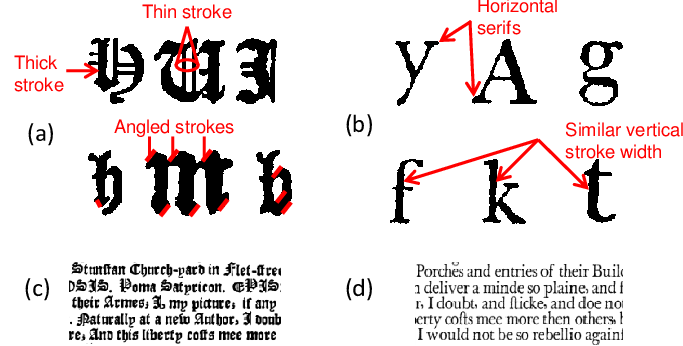
(a–b) Characteristics of Blackletter and Roman font; (c–d) corresponding text snippets

==== Size ====
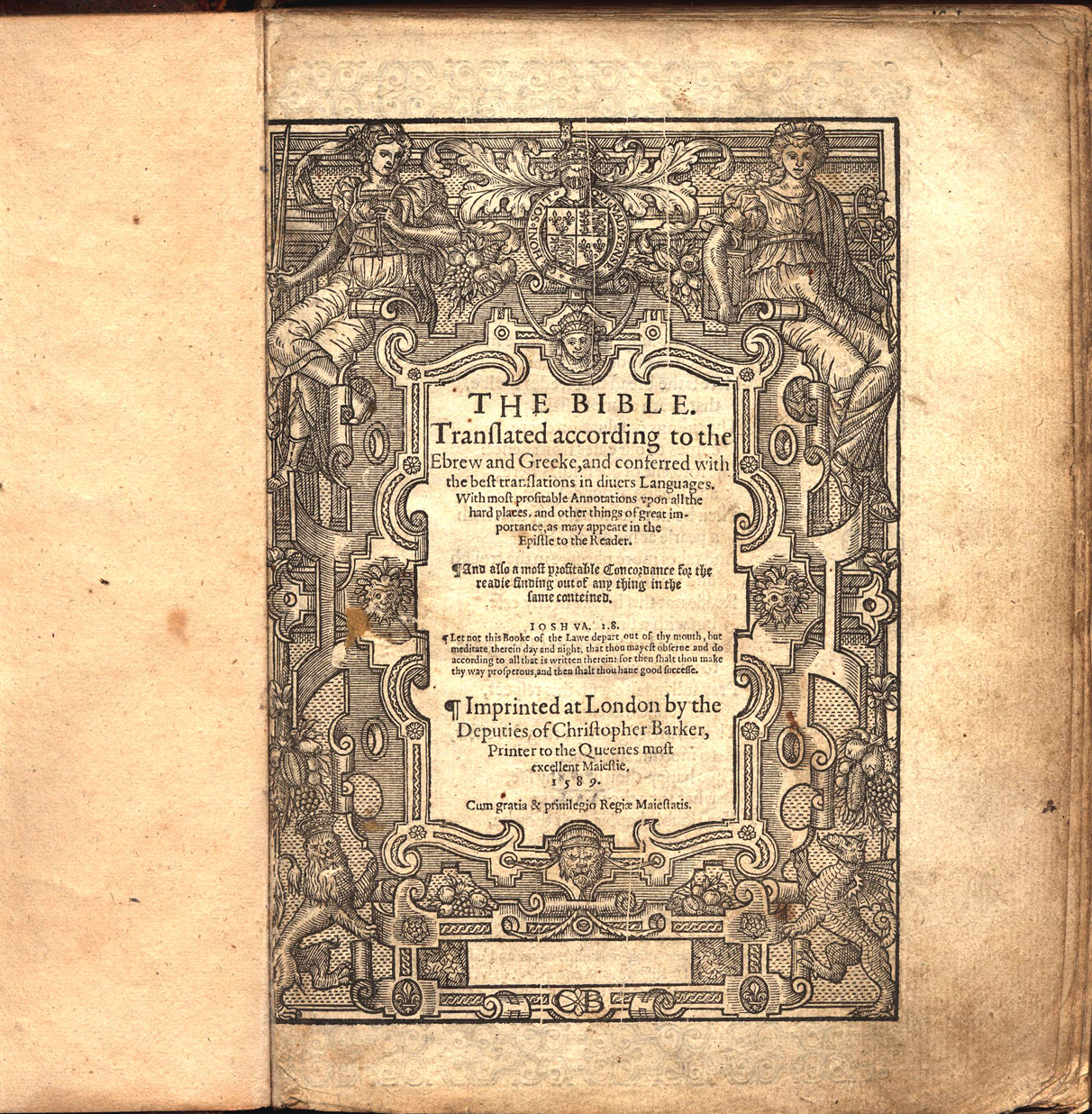
Geneva Bible title page 1589

The Geneva Bible was also issued in more convenient and affordable sizes than earlier versions. The 1560 Bible was in quarto format (218 × 139 mm type area), but pocket-size octavo editions were also issued, and a few large folio editions. The New Testament was issued at various times in sizes from quarto down to 32º (the smallest, 70×39 mm type area).

==== Type ====
Unlike previous English bibles which had been printed in Gothic script, the Geneva Bible used Roman type which was easier to read.

== Breeches Bible ==
Here are both the Geneva, Tyndale and the King James versions of Genesis 3:7 with original spelling (not modernized):

Tyndale Bible And the eyes of both them were opened that they vnderstode how that they were naked. Than they sowed fygge leves togedder and made them apurns.	Geneva Bible Then the eies of them both were opened, and they knew that they were naked, and they sewed figge tree leaves together, and made themselves breeches.	King James Bible Then the eyes of them both were opened, and they knew that they were naked, and they sewed figge tree leaves together, and made themselves aprons.

== King James I and the Geneva Bible ==
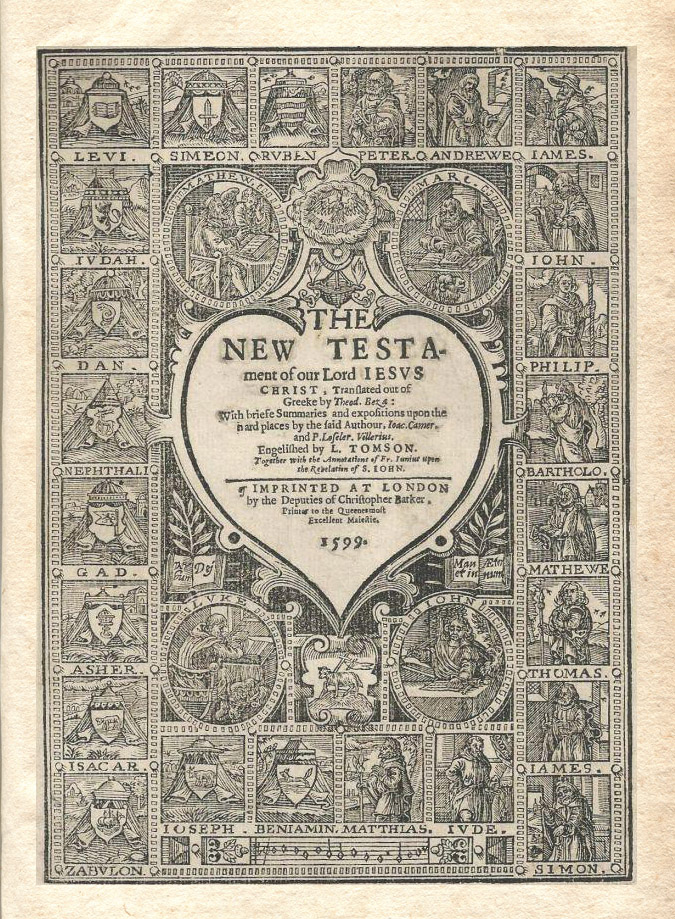
Title page of a New Testament from the Geneva Bible, dated 1599 but probably printed circa 1616–1625

King James I's distaste for the Geneva Bible was not caused by the translation of the text into English, but rather the annotations in the margins. He felt strongly that many of the annotations were "very partial, untrue, seditious, and savoring too much of dangerous and traitorous conceits". In all likelihood, he saw the Geneva's interpretations of some biblical passages as anti-clerical "republicanism", which could imply church hierarchy was unnecessary. Other passages appeared particularly seditious, most notably references to monarchs as "tyrants".

Examples of the commentary in conflict with the monarchy in the Geneva Bible (modern spelling) include:

- Daniel 6:22 – "For he [Daniel] disobeyed the king’s wicked commandment in order to obey God, and so he did no injury to the king, who ought to command nothing by which God would be dishonoured."
- Daniel 11:36 – "So long the tyrants will prevail as God has appointed to punish his people: but he shows that it is but for a time."
- Exodus 1:19 – To the Hebrew midwives lying to their leaders, "Their disobedience herein was lawful, but their dissembling evil."
- 2 Chronicles 15:15-17 – King Asa "showed that he lacked zeal, for she should have died both by the covenant and by the law of God, but he gave place to foolish pity and would also seem after a sort to satisfy the law."

When toward the end of the conference two Puritans suggested that a new translation of the Bible be produced to better unify the Anglican Church in England and Scotland, James embraced the idea. He would not only be rid of those inconvenient annotations but have greater influence on the translation of the Bible as a whole. He commissioned and chartered a new translation of the Bible which would eventually become the most famous version of the Bible in the history of the English language. Officially known as the Authorized Version as it was ordered to be read in churches, the new version would commonly be called the King James Version (KJV). The first and early editions of the King James Bible from 1611 and the first few decades thereafter lack annotations, unlike nearly all editions of the Geneva Bible up until that time.

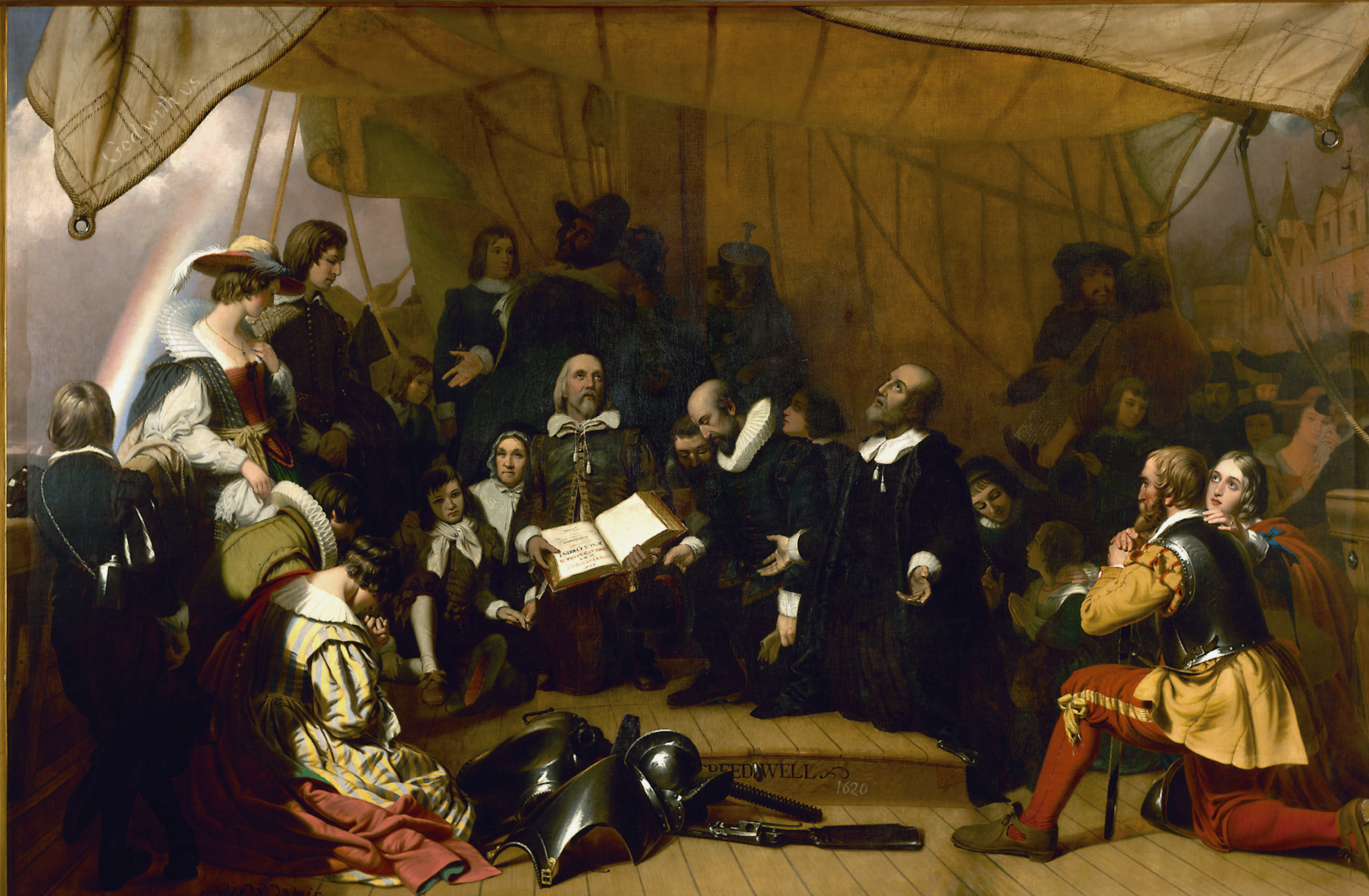
Puritans bringing the Geneva Bible to the New World

Initially, the King James Version did not sell well and competed with the Geneva Bible. Shortly after the first edition of the KJV, King James banned the printing of new editions of the Geneva Bible to further entrench his version. However, Robert Barker continued to print Geneva Bibles even after the ban, placing the fictitious date of 1599 on new copies of Genevas which were actually printed between about 1616 and 1625.

== Legacy ==
Although the King James Version was intended to replace the Geneva Bible, the King James translators relied heavily upon this version. Bruce Metzger, in Theology Today (1960), observes the inevitable reliance the KJV had on the Geneva Bible. Some estimate that twenty percent of the former came directly from the latter. He further revels in the enormous impact the Geneva Bible had on Protestantism: "In short, it was chiefly owing to the dissemination of copies of the Geneva version of 1560 that a sturdy and articulate Protestantism was created in Britain, a Protestantism which made a permanent impact upon Anglo-American culture."

The Puritan Separatists or Pilgrim Fathers aboard the Mayflower in 1620 brought to North America copies of the Geneva Bible. German historian Leopold von Ranke observed that "Calvin was virtually the founder of America."

== See also ==
- Tyndale Bible (1526)
- Coverdale Bible (1535)
- Matthew Bible (1537)
- Taverner's Bible (1539)
- Great Bible (1539)
- Bishops' Bible (1568)
- Douay–Rheims Bible (1582)
- King James Bible (1611)
