= Matthew Bible =

1537 English Bible by John Rogers

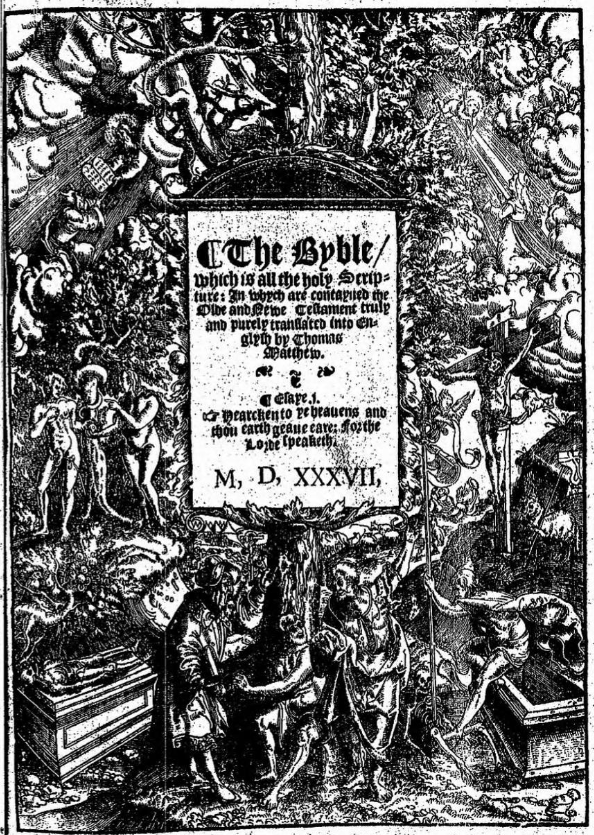
- Full name: Matthew Bible or Matthew's Version
- Copyright: Public domain
- Genesis 1:1–3 In the beginnynge GOD created heauen and erth. The erth was voyde and empty, and darcknesse was vpon the depe, and the spirite of God moued vpon the water. Than God sayd: let there be light: & there was lyght. John 3:16 For God so loueth the worlde, that he hath geuen his only sonne, that none that beleue in him, should perishe: but should haue euerlastinge lyfe.

The Matthew Bible, also known as Matthew's Version, was first published in 1537 by John Rogers, under the pseudonym "Thomas Matthew". It combined the New Testament of William Tyndale, and as much of the Old Testament as he had been able to translate before being captured and put to death. Myles Coverdale translated chiefly from German and Latin sources and completed the Old Testament and Biblical apocrypha, except for the Prayer of Manasseh, which was Rogers', into the Coverdale Bible. It is thus a vital link in the main sequence of English Bible translations.

== Translation ==
The Matthew Bible was the combined work of three individuals, working from numerous sources in at least five different languages.

The entire New Testament (first published in 1526 and later revised in 1534), the Pentateuch, Jonah and in David Daniell's view, the Book of Joshua, Judges, Ruth, First and Second Samuel, First and Second Kings, and First and Second Chronicles, were the work of William Tyndale. Tyndale consulted Luther's German Bible, Erasmus’ Latin version, and the Vulgate for the biblical text, prefaces, and marginal notes, and worked directly with the Hebrew and Greek. The use of the pseudonym "Thomas Matthew" resulted possibly from the need to conceal from Henry VIII the participation of Tyndale in the translation. A theory exists from Dr. Harding that indicates the name Thomas Matthew, which in Greek means "A twin to the original gift from God", may have been chosen to indicate that the largest contributing author was indeed William Tyndale and that his writings were preserved by Coverdale and Rogers.

The remaining books of the Old Testament and the Apocrypha were the work of John Rogers and Myles Coverdale. Coverdale originally translated primarily from German and Latin sources and in the Matthew Bible they used the original language texts to translate. Historians often tend to treat Coverdale and Tyndale like competitors in a race to complete the monumental and arduous task of translating the biblical text. One is often credited to the exclusion of the other. In reality they knew each other and occasionally worked together. Contemporary historian John Foxe states that they were in Hamburg translating the Pentateuch together as early as 1529.

The Prayer of Manasseh was the work of John Rogers. Rogers translated from a French Bible printed two years earlier (in 1535). Rogers compiled the completed work and added the preface, some marginal notes, a calendar and an almanac.

Of the three translators, two met with martyrdom. Tyndale was strangled to death and his body burned on 6 October 1536 in Vilvoorde, Belgium. John Rogers was "tested by fire" on 4 February 1555 at Smithfield, England; the first to meet this fate under Mary I of England. Myles Coverdale was employed by Cromwell to work on the Great Bible of 1539, the first officially authorized English translation of the Bible.

Time and extensive scholastic scrutiny have judged Tyndale the most gifted of the three translators. Dr. Westcott (in his History of the English Bible) claims that "The history of our English Bible begins with the work of Tyndale and not with that of Wycliffe." The quality of his translations and choices have also stood the test of time, coming relatively intact even into modern versions of the Bible. A. S. Herbert, Bible cataloguer, says of the Matthew Bible, "this version, which welds together the best work of Tyndale and Coverdale, is generally considered to be the real primary version of our English Bible", upon which later editions were based, including the Geneva Bible and King James Version. Professor David Daniell recounts that, "New Testament scholars Jon Nielson and Royal Skousen observed that previous estimates of Tyndale's contribution to the KJV 'have run from a high of up to 90% (Westcott) to a low of 18% (Butterworth)'. By a statistically accurate and appropriate method of sampling, based on eighteen portions of the Bible, they concluded that for the (KJV) New Testament Tyndale's contribution is about 83% of the text, and in the Old Testament 76%. However, these studies do not in turn deal with the contributions of previous versions to Tyndale.

The Matthew Bible, though largely unrecognized, significantly shaped and influenced English Bible versions in the centuries that followed its first appearance.

== Printing ==
John Strype wrote in 1694 that the 1537 Matthew Bible was printed by Richard Grafton, in Hamburg. Later editions were printed in London; the last of four appeared in 1551. Two editions of the Matthew Bible were published in 1549. One was a reprint of the 1537 first edition, and was printed by Thomas Raynalde and William Hyll (Herbert #75). The other was printed by John Daye and William Seres, and made extensive changes to the notes of the original Matthew Bible, included copious commentaries on the book of Revelation based on the book Image of Two Churches by contemporary John Bale.

Van Meteren's son, Emanuel, stated in an affidavit dated 28 May 1609 that his father was "a furtherer of reformed religion, and he that caused the first Bible at his costes to be Englisshed by Mr Myles Coverdal in Andwarp, the w’h his father, with Mr Edward Whytchurch, printed both in Paris and London." Coverdale was employed as a translator by Jacobus van Meteren. Rogers began assisting the work around 1535, and married J. van Meteren's niece Adriana in the same year that the Matthew Bible was first published (1537). Rogers was living in London again at the time of the second printing of the Matthew Bible in 1549.

== Literature ==
=== Editions of the original text ===
- The Matthew's Bible in modern spelling Matthewsbible.com
- The Matthew's Bible. 1537 edition [Facsimile]. Peabody, Massachusetts, Hendrickson Publishers, 2009, ISBN 978-1-59856-349-8
- The Tyndale Bible, Thomas Matthew, 1549 [Facsimile]. Greydon Press, USA, 2003, ISBN 1-57074-492-0. Sold as a facsimile of Matthew's Version, it is in fact Becke's 1549 edition of the Matthew Bible but contains preliminary pages from Raynalde and Hyll's 1549 version, and even a copy of the title page from the 1549 Great Bible.

=== Projects updating the Matthew Bible ===
- New Matthew Bible: World's first project working with the Matthew Bible scriptures to publish the Matthew Bible in modern spelling with language and grammar minimally updated - "New Matthew Bible Project", with a target publication date of 2025–26.
- The Matthew Bible-Modern Spelling Edition: "The Matthew Bible-Modern Spelling Edition, translated by Dr. Nathan Harding". This Bible uses modern font and spelling (without changing the original wording). It includes modern verse divisions.
- Tyndale, Rogers, Coverdale (Ed.) Dr. Nathan Harding "The Book of Psalms -The Matthew Bible Modern Spelling.

== See also ==
- Tyndale Bible (1526)
- Coverdale Bible (1535)
- Taverner's Bible (1539)
- Great Bible (1539)
- Geneva Bible (1560)
- Bishops' Bible (1568)
- Douay–Rheims Bible (1582)
- King James Bible (1611)

== References (general) ==
- Herbert, A. S. (1968), Historical Catalogue of Printed Editions of the English Bible, 1525–1961, London & New York: British and Foreign Bible Society; American Bible Society, ISBN 0-564-00130-9
- Strype, J. (1812) [1694], Memorials of the Most Reverend Father in God Thomas Cranmer, Sometime Lord Archbishop of Canterbury: Wherein the History of the Church, and the Reformation of It, During the Primacy of the Said Archbishop, Are Greatly Illustrated; And Many Singular Matters Relating Thereunto, Now First Published (1694) in Three Books, vol. 1, Clarendon, OCLC 154289588
