= Laurence Tomson =

English politician, author, and translator

Laurence Tomson (1539 – 29 March 1608) was an English politician, author, and translator. He acted as the personal secretary of Sir Francis Walsingham, the secretary of state to Elizabeth I of England.

Tomson revised both the text and the annotations of the New Testament of the Geneva Bible. His revised edition appeared in 1576. Tomson was a Calvinist, and his annotations reflect that system of theology.

== Life ==
He was born in Northamptonshire, and was admitted a demy of Magdalen College, Oxford, in 1553. He graduated B.A. in 1559, was elected a fellow of his college, and commenced M.A. in 1564. He accompanied Sir Thomas Hoby on an embassy to France in 1566, and resigned his Magdalen fellowship in 1569.

Between 1575 and 1587 Tomson represented Weymouth and Melcombe Regis in the House of Commons, and he was member for Downton in 1588–9. In 1582 he was in attendance at court at Windsor Castle. According to his epitaph he travelled in Sweden, Russia, Denmark, Germany, Italy, and France; was conversant with twelve languages; and at one period gave public lectures on the Hebrew language at Geneva. He was employed in political affairs by Sir Francis Walsingham, after whose death he retired into private life.

Tomson died on 29 March 1608, and was buried in the chancel of the church at Chertsey, Surrey, where a black marble was erected to his memory with a curious Latin inscription.

== Works ==
His works are:

- ‘An Answere to certeine Assertions and Obiections of M. Fecknam,’ London [1570].
- ‘Statement of Advantages to be obtained by the establishment of a Mart Town in England,’ 1572, manuscript in the Public Record Office.
- ‘The New Testament … translated out of Greeke by T. Beza. Whereunto are adjoyned brief summaries of doctrine … by the said T. Beza: and also short expositions … taken out of the large annotations of the foresaid authour and J. Camerarius. By P. Loseler, Villerius. Englished by L. Tomson,’ London, 1576, dedicated to Sir Francis Walsingham; again 1580, 1587, 1596. Several other editions of Tomson's revision of the Genevan version of the New Testament were published in the whole Bible. It was based on the work of Pierre Loiseleur.
- ‘A Treatise of the Excellencie of a Christian Man, and how he may be knowen. Written in French. ... Whereunto is adioyned a briefe description of the life and death of the said authour (set forth by P. de Farnace). ... Translated into English,’ London, 1576, 1577, 1585, dedicated to Mrs. Ursula Walsingham.
- ‘Sermons of J. Calvin on the Epistles of S. Paule to Timothie and Titus … Translated,’ London, 1579.
- ‘Propositions taught and mayntained by Mr. R[ichard] Hooker. The same briefly confuted by L. T. in a private letter’ (Harleian MS. 291, f. 183).
- ‘Treatise on the matters in controversy between the Merchants of the Hanze Towns and the Merchants Adventurers,’ 1590, a Latin manuscript in the Public Record Office.
- ‘Mary, the Mother of Christ: her tears,’ London, 1596.
- ‘Brief Remarks on the State of the Low Countries’ (Cottonian MS., Galba D vii. f. 163).
