= Coverdale Bible =

Bible in Modern English, published 1535

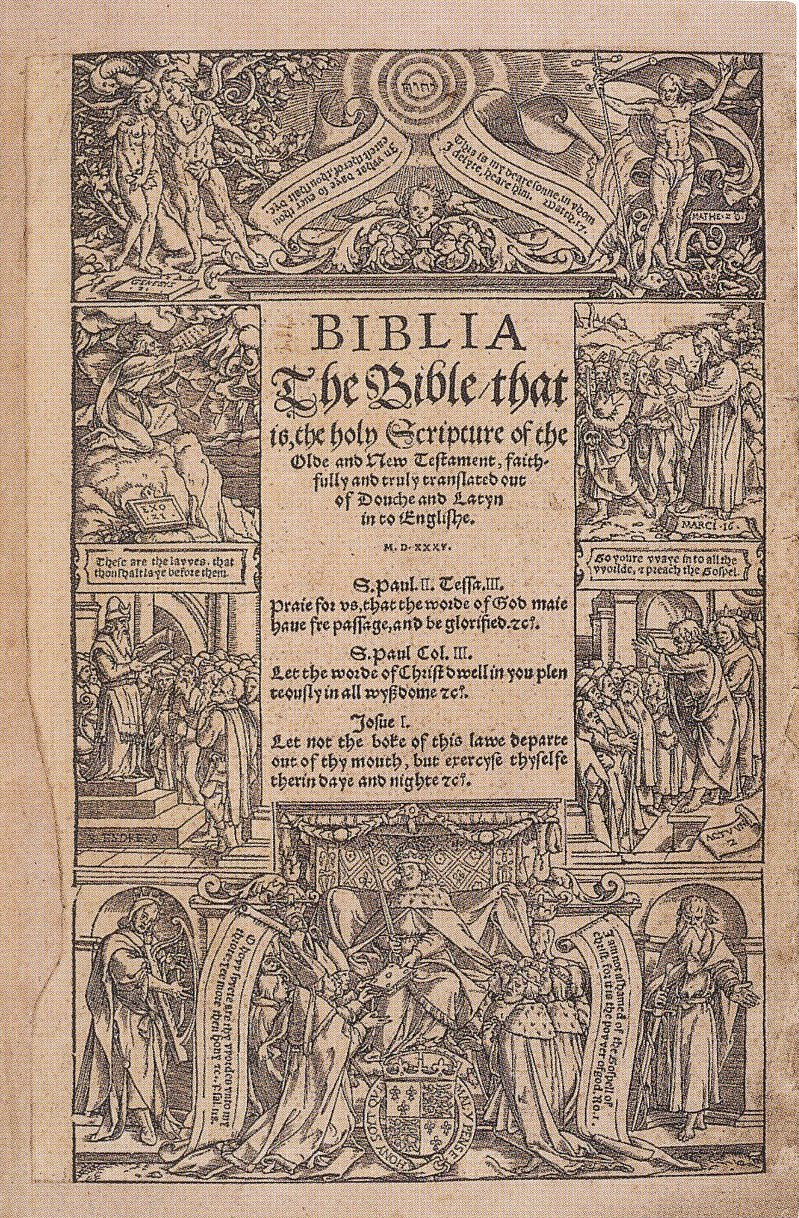
- Full name: The Bible, that is the Holy Scripture of the Old and New Testament, faithfully translated into English.
- Abbreviation: TCB
- Complete Bible published: 1535
- Copyright: Public domain due to age.
- Genesis 1:1–3 In the beginning God created heaven and earth: and the earth was void and empty, and darkness was upon deep, and the Spirit of God moved upon the water. And God said: Let there be light, and there was light. John 3:16 For God so loved the world, that he gave his only Son, that whosoever believeth in him should not perish, but have everlasting life.

The Coverdale Bible, compiled by Myles Coverdale and published in 1535, was the first complete Modern English translation of the Bible (not just the Old, or New Testament), and the first complete printed translation into English (Wycliffe's Bible was a previous manuscript translation). The later editions (folio and quarto) published in 1537 were the first complete Bibles printed in England. The 1537 folio edition carried the royal licence and was therefore the first royally approved Bible translation in English. The Psalter from the Coverdale Bible was included in the Great Bible of 1540 and the Anglican Book of Common Prayer beginning in 1662, and in all editions of the U.S. Episcopal Church Book of Common Prayer until 1979.

== History ==
The first edition was printed on October 4, 1535.

The place of publication of the 1535 edition was long disputed. The printer was assumed to be either Froschover in Zürich or Cervicornus and Soter (in Cologne or Marburg). In 1997, Guido Latré identified the printer as Merten de Keyser, in Antwerp. The publication was partly financed by Jacobus van Meteren, in Antwerp, whose sister-in-law, Adriana de Weyden, married John Rogers. The other backer of the Coverdale Bible was Jacobus van Meteren's nephew, Leonard Ortels (†1539), the father of Abraham Ortelius (1527–1598), humanist geographer and cartographer.

Although Coverdale was also involved in the preparation of the Great Bible of 1539, the Coverdale Bible continued to be reprinted. The last of over 20 editions of the whole Bible, or its New Testament, appeared in 1553.

== Translation ==
Coverdale used several sources for his translation, including Tyndale’s work and German and Latin translations.

Coverdale based his New Testament on Tyndale's translation. For the Old Testament, Coverdale used Tyndale's published Pentateuch and possibly his published Jonah. He apparently did not make use of any of Tyndale's other, unpublished, Old Testament material (cf. Matthew Bible). Instead, Coverdale himself translated the remaining books of the Old Testament and the Apocrypha. Coverdale used his working intermediate knowledge of Hebrew, Aramaic, and Greek. Not being a Hebrew or Greek scholar, he worked primarily from German Bibles—Luther's Bible and the Swiss-German version (Zürich Bible) of Huldrych Zwingli and Leo Jud. He also used Latin sources including the Vulgate.

== See also ==
- Tyndale Bible (1526)
- Matthew Bible (1537)
- Taverner's Bible (1539)
- Great Bible (1539)
- Geneva Bible (1560)
- Bishops' Bible (1568)
- Douay–Rheims Bible (1582)
- King James Bible (1611)
