= Jacobus van Meteren =

Dutch financier and publisher (1519–1555)

Sir Jacobus van Meteren (1519–1555) was the financier and printer of early English versions of the Bible. He was involved in the printing of an edition of Tyndale's New Testament in 1535 (Herbert #15). The Coverdale Bible of 1535 (Herbert #18) may also have been his work. He may also have printed the Matthew Bible of 1537 (Herbert #34), the combined work of William Tyndale, Myles Coverdale and John Rogers. It is unknown if he was the only financier, printer or publisher of these works, or one of several.

He was born at Breda, but there has been some debate over the details of his life from the 1911 Encyclopædia Britannica:

In 1877 Henry Stevens, in his catalogue of the Caxton Exhibition, pointed out a statement by a certain Simeon Ruytinck in his life of Emanuel van Meteren, appended to the latter's Nederlandische Historic (16,4), that Jacob van Meteren, the father of Emanuel, had manifested great zeal in producing at Antwerp a translation of the Bible into English, and had employed for that purpose a certain learned scholar named Miles Conerdale (sic).

In 1884 further evidence was adduced by W. J. C. Moens, who reprinted an affidavit signed by Emanuel van Meteren, 28 May 1609, to the effect that "he was brought to England anno 1550 . . . by his father, a furtherer of reformed religion, and he that caused the first Bible at his costes to be Englisshed by Mr Myles Coverdal in Andwarp, the w'h his father, with Mr Edward Whytchurch, printed both in Paris and London" (Registers of the Dutch Reformed Church, Austin Friars, 1884, p. xiv).

Apart from the reference to Whytchurch and the place of printing, this statement agrees with that of Simeon Ruytinck, and it is possible that Van Meteren showed his zeal in the matter by undertaking the cost of printing the work as well as that of remunerating the translator. Mr W. Aldis Wright, however, judging from the facts that the name of Whytchurch was introduced, that the places of printing were given as London and Paris, not Antwerp, and lastly that Emanuel van Meteren being born in 1535 could only have derived his knowledge from hearsay, is inclined to think that the Bible in which J. van Meteren was interested "was Matthew's of 1537 or the Great Bible of 1539, and not Coverdale's of 1535".

Since the discovery of Guido Latré in 1997, it is believed that Emanuel van Meteren's affidavit of 1609 refers to the printing of the Coverdale Bible in 1535, when his father employed Myles Coverdale as translator. It could also refer to the Matthew Bible of 1537. The names of Grafton and Whitchurch are associated with the Matthew Bible, not the Coverdale Bible.

Rogers married J. van Meteren's niece, Adriana de Weyden, the same year that the Matthew Bible was published. If J. van Meteren was the printer of the Coverdale Bible, he would readily have been able to provide Rogers with Coverdale's prior work covering those books of the Old Testament which Tyndale had not had time to translate.
