= Bishops' Bible =

Second authorised English translation of the Bible

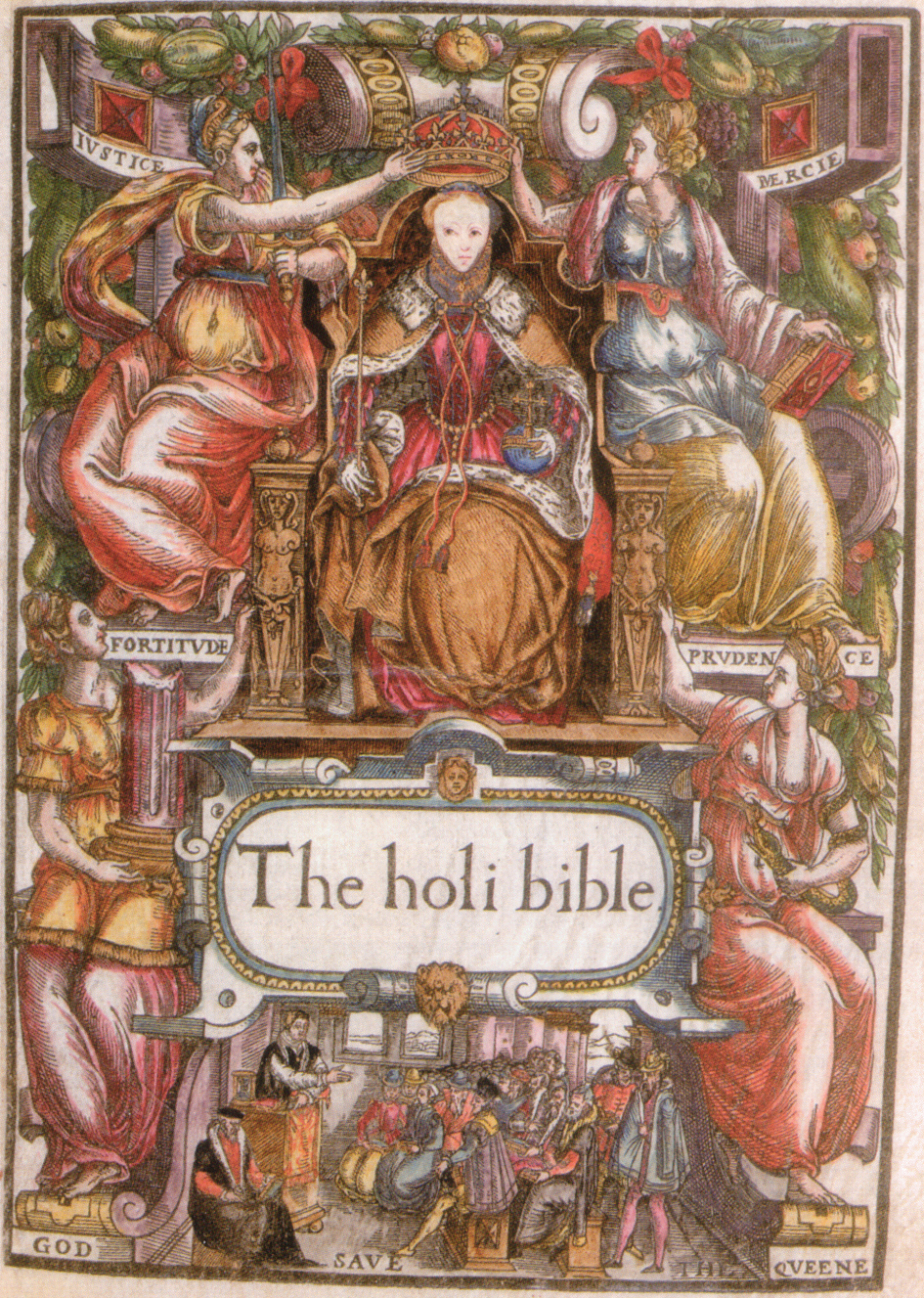
- Though not formally dedicated to Queen Elizabeth, the Bishops' Bible includes a portrait of the queen on its title page. The 1569 quarto edition shows Elizabeth accompanied by female personifications of Justice, Mercy, Fortitude and Prudence.
- Complete Bible published: 1568
- Online as: Bishops' Bible at Wikisource
- Translation type: Formal Equivalence
- Religious affiliation: Anglican
- Genesis 1:1–3 In the beginnyng GOD created yͤ heauen and the earth. And the earth was without fourme, and was voyde: & darknes [was] vpon the face of the deepe, and the ſpirite of God moued vpon the face of the waters. And God ſayde, let there be light: and there was light. John 3:16 For God ſo loued the worlde, that he gaue his only begotten ſonne, that whoſoeuer beleueth in hym, ſhoulde not periſhe, but haue euerlaſtyng lyfe.

The Bishops' Bible is an English edition of the Bible which was produced under the authority of the established Church of England in 1568. It was substantially revised in 1572, and the 1602 edition was prescribed as the base text for the King James Version that was completed in 1611.

== History ==
The Bishops' Bible succeeded the Great Bible of 1539, the first authorised bible in English, and the Geneva Bible published by Sir Rowland Hill in 1560.

The thorough Calvinism of the Geneva Bible (more evident in the marginal notes than in the translation itself) offended the high-church party of the Church of England, to which almost all of its bishops subscribed. Though most mainstream English clergy agreed with much of Calvin's theology, the majority did not approve of his prescribed church polity, Presbyterianism, which sought to replace government of the church by bishops (Episcopalian) with government by lay elders. However, they were aware that the Great Bible of 1539—which was the only version then legally authorized for use in Anglican worship—differed, in that much of the Old Testament and Apocrypha was translated from the Latin Vulgate, rather than from the original Hebrew and Aramaic. In an attempt to replace the objectionable Geneva translation, they circulated one of their own, which became known as the "Bishops' Bible".

The promoter of the exercise, and the leading figure in translating was Matthew Parker, Archbishop of Canterbury. It was at his instigation that the various sections translated by Parker and his fellow bishops were followed by their initials in the early editions. For instance, at the end of the book of Deuteronomy, the initials "W.E." are found, which, according to a letter Parker wrote to Sir William Cecil, stand for William Alley, Bishop of Exeter. Parker tells Cecil that this system was "to make [the translators] more diligent, as answerable for their doings". Parker failed to commission anyone to act as supervisory editor for the work completed by the various translators, and was too busy to do so himself, and accordingly translation practice varies greatly from book to book. Hence, in most of the Old Testament (as is standard in English versions) the tetragrammaton YHWH is represented by "the LORD", and the Hebrew "Elohim" is represented by "God". But in the Psalms the practice is the opposite way around. The books that Parker himself worked on are fairly sparingly edited from the text of the Great Bible, while those undertaken by Grindal of London emerged much closer to the Geneva text.

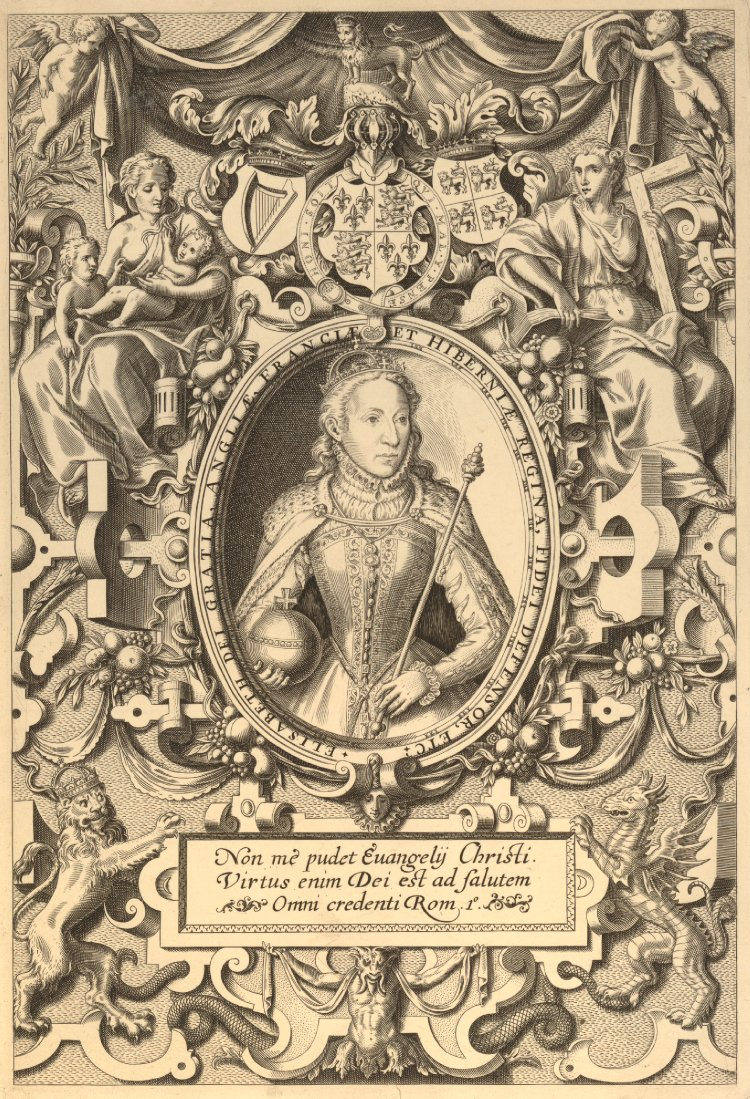
In this edition, Queen Elizabeth I is flanked by allegorical virtues of Faith and Charity; Elizabeth therefore represents Hope. Beneath the portrait is a Latin text from Romans 1:16.

The bishops deputed to revise the Apocrypha appear to have delivered very little, as the text in these books broadly reproduces that of the Great Bible. As the Apocrypha of the Great Bible was translated from the Latin Vulgate, the Bishops' Bible cannot strictly claim to have been entirely translated from the original tongues.

The Bishops' Bible was first published in 1568, but was then re-issued in an extensively revised form in 1572. In the revision a number of switches were made to the New Testament in the direction of more "ecclesiastical" language (e.g. introducing the term "charity" into I Corinthians 13), but otherwise to bring the text more into line with that found in the Geneva Bible; and in the Old Testament, the Psalms from the Great Bible were printed alongside those in the new translation, which had proved impossible to sing. The new psalm translation was printed only once more (in 1585) and otherwise dropped altogether; while further incremental changes were made to the text of the New Testament in subsequent editions. The Bible had the authority of the royal warrant, and was the second version appointed to be read aloud in church services (cf. Great Bible, King James Bible). It failed to displace the Geneva Bible as a domestic Bible to be read at home, but that was not its intended purpose. The intention was for it to be used in church as what would today be termed a "pulpit Bible". The version was more grandiloquent than the Geneva Bible. The first edition was exceptionally large and included 124 full-page illustrations. The second and subsequent editions were rather smaller, around the same size as the first printing of the King James Bible, and mostly lacked illustrations other than frontispieces and maps. The text lacked most of the notes and cross-references in the Geneva Bible, which contained much controversial theology, but which were helpful to people among whom the Bible was just beginning to circulate in the vernacular. The last edition of the complete Bible was issued in 1602, but the New Testament was reissued until at least 1617. William Fulke published several parallel editions up to 1633, with the New Testament of the Bishops' Bible alongside the Rheims New Testament, specifically to controvert the latter's polemical annotations. The Bishops' Bible or its New Testament went through over 50 editions, whereas the Geneva Bible was reprinted more than 150 times.

== Legacy ==
The translators of the King James Version were instructed to take the 1602 edition of the Bishops' Bible as their basis, although several other existing translations were taken into account. After it was published in 1611, the King James Version soon took the Bishops' Bible's place as the de facto standard of the Church of England. Later judgments of the Bishops' Bible have not been favorable; David Daniell, in his important edition of William Tyndale's New Testament, states that the Bishops' Bible "was, and is, not loved. Where it reprints Geneva it is acceptable, but most of the original work is incompetent, both in its scholarship and its verbosity". Jack P. Lewis, in his book The Day after Domesday: The Making of the Bishops' Bible, notes that unsympathetic reviews of this Bible have been done. However, "[G]ranting all the shortcomings eighteenth- to twenty-first-century scholarship can find in the Bishops' Bible, it was an important stage in moving English people from prohibited Bible reading to being a Bible-reading people. The revisers labored to give God's book to God's people in a language they could understand. The King James translators did not think they were making a bad translation into a good one, but were making a good one better."

Unlike Tyndale's translations and the Geneva Bible, the Bishops' Bible has rarely been reprinted; however, facsimiles are available. The most available reprinting of its New Testament portion (minus its marginal notes) can be found in the fourth column of the New Testament Octapla edited by Luther Weigle, chairman of the translation committee that produced the Revised Standard Version.

The Bishops' Bible is also known as the "Treacle Bible", because of its translation of Jeremiah 8:22 which reads "Is there not treacle at Gilead?", a rendering also found in several earlier versions as well as the Great Bible. In the Authorized Version of 1611, "treacle" was changed to "balm", in reference to the Balm of Gilead.

== See also ==
- Tyndale Bible (1526)
- Coverdale Bible (1535)
- Matthew Bible (1537)
- Taverner's Bible (1539)
- Great Bible (1539)
- Geneva Bible (1560)
- Douay–Rheims Bible (1582)
- King James Bible (1611)
