= Gregory Martin (scholar) =

English scholar and translator

The Reverend Gregory Martin
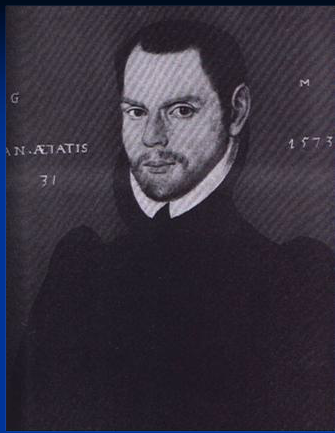
- Old portrait of 16th century Roman Catholic Priest and Bible Translator, Father Gregory Martin

Orders
- Ordination: March 1573

Personal details
- Born: 1542 Sussex, England
- Died: 28 October 1582 (aged 39–40) Reims, France
- Denomination: Roman Catholic

Gregory Martin (c. 1542 – 28 October 1582) was an English Catholic priest, a noted scholar of his time, academic and Doctor of Divinity, and served as the chief translator of the Rheims and Douai Version of the Bible, the first full, official Catholic English Bible translation, translated from the Latin Vulgate and "diligently conferred with the Hebrew, Greek, and other editions in divers languages".

In preparing the translation, he was assisted by several of the other scholars then living in the English College, Douai, the most noteworthy of which were Richard Bristow, William Rainolds (Reynolds), and Cardinal William Allen, who each served as revisers and likely as annotators, though Martin made the whole translation in the first instance and bore the brunt of the work throughout; Thomas Worthington, who was absent from Reims during much of Martin's initial translation period, later took up the task of editing, annotating, and publishing the Douai Old Testament.

== Life ==
He was born in Maxfield, a parish of Guestling, near Winchelsea, in Sussex, an historic county of South East England, and entered as one of the original scholars of St John's College, Oxford, in 1557. Among those who also entered at the beginning was Edmund Campion, the Jesuit martyr; at this period of his life, he conformed to the established Anglican Church, and was ordained as a deacon. Campion was Martin's close friend throughout his Oxford days, and he remained a Catholic.

When he found it necessary to quit the university, he was tutor in the family of the Duke of Norfolk, where he had among his pupils Philip, Earl of Arundel, also subsequently martyred. During his residence with the Duke, Martin wrote to Campion, warning him that he was being led away into danger by his ambition, and begging him to leave Oxford. It is said that it was in great measure due to this advice that Campion migrated to Dublin in 1570, and accepted a post in the university there.

In the meantime, Gregory Martin left the house of the Duke of Norfolk, and crossing the seas, presented himself at Dr Allen's College at Douai as a candidate for the priesthood, in 1570. During his early days there, he wrote once more to Campion, and they met at Douai. Campion was now a professed Catholic, and he received minor orders and the subdiaconate, after which he proceeded to Rome and eventually entered the Jesuits.

Having finished his theology, Gregory Martin was ordained priest in March 1573. Three years later, he went to Rome to assist Allen in the foundation of the English College there, known by the title of the "Venerabile." Martin remained two years, during which time he organised the course of studies at the new college, when he was recalled by Allen to Reims, where the college had moved from Douai in consequence of political troubles. In a letter to Campion on 22 August 1578, Martin suggested uncertainty even of the new home for the college, explaining that "it is most uncertain whether we shall remain here in quiet and permanently" due to the suspicion of Englishmen amongst the French. Martin and Campion met for the last time in the summer of 1580, when the latter made a short stay at Reims on his way to the English Mission, and thus to his martyrdom.

Returning from Rome to College at Reims in July 1578, Martin began work on a Catholic translation of the Bible the following October, at the request of Allen, in order to counter the extant Protestant versions. Thomas Worthington, Richard Bristow, William Rainolds, and Allen himself were to assist in revising the text and preparing suitable notes to the passages which were most used by the Protestants. Translating around two chapters per day, Martin is believed to have completed his work around July 1580.

It was accuracy of rendering which was chiefly needed by the controversial exigencies of the day. Martin's translation was made from the Vulgate, and is full of Latinisms, so that it has little of the rhythmic harmony of the Anglican Authorized Version; but in accuracy and scholarship, it was superior to the English versions which had preceded it, and it is understood to have had influence on the translators of King James's Version. In many cases in which they did not follow the Douai, the editors of the Revised Version have upheld Martin's translation.

The Reims New Testament first appeared in March 1582, joined in June by a companion volume of Martin's, A Discovery of the Manifold Corruptions of the Holy Scripture by the Heretikes of our Daies. The Old Testament was not published till more than a quarter of a century later. This, however, was solely due to want of funds. It was not called for with such urgency, and its publication was put off from year to year. But it was all prepared at the same time as the New Testament, and by the same editors.

Father Martin was found to be in consumption, a lethal form of tuberculosis. In the hope of saving his life, Allen sent him to Paris, but the disease was past cure. He returned to Reims to die, and he was buried in the parish church of St Stephen. Allen preached the funeral discourse, and had a long Latin inscription put on the tomb of his friend. The parish church, and with it Martin's monument, was lost during the French Revolution.

The English Catholic printer William Carter was executed in 1584 for having printed Martin's A Treatise of Schisme. A paragraph in which Martin expressed confidence that "the Catholic Hope would triumph, and pious Judith would slay Holofernes" was interpreted as an incitement to slay Queen Elizabeth I, though in all likelihood this paragraph was just a metaphor representing the Holy Mother Church as Judith slaying the perceived heretics, the Protestants.

== Works ==
The following is a list of Martin's works:

- A Treatise of Schisme (Douai, 1578)
- The New Testament of Jesus Christ, translated faithfully into English, out of the authentical Latin (Reims, 1582); The Holie Bible, faithfully translated into English, out of the authentical Latin, 2 vols. (Douai, 1609/10)
- A Discovery of the Manifold Corruptions of the Holy Scripture by the Heretikes of our Daies (Reims, 1582)
- A Treatise of Christian Peregrination (Reims, 1583); letters within published as The Love of the Soul (Rouen, 1578)
- Gregorius Martinus ad Adolphum Mekerchum pro veteri et vera Græcarum Literarum Pronunciatione (Oxford, 1712)
- Roma Sancta (Rome, 1969)
- Several other works in manuscript found in Pitts.

== See also ==
- Latin Vulgate
- Catholic Bible
- Bible translations into English
- Douay Rheims Bible
- University of Douai
- The English College at Douai
- Catholic Church in France
- Reims, France
