= List of presidents of the English College, Douai =

This is a list of presidents of the English College, Douai.

Name	Start	End	Died	Remarks
William Allen	1568	16 October 1594	Idem	Founder
Richard Barret	31 October 1588	20 May 1599	Idem	
Thomas Worthington	1 July 1599	15 May 1613	1626	Removed
Matthew Kellison	11 November 1613	21 January 1641	Idem	
George Muscott (vere Fisher)	November 1641	14 December 1645	idem	At the time of his appointment he was in The Clink.
William Hyde	21 July 1646	22 December 1651	Idem	Deputised for Muscott, and then succeeded him
George Leyburn	24 June 1652	24 June 1670	29 December 1677	Resigned in favour of his nephew
John Leyburn	25 June 1670	1675/6	July 1702/3	Resigned
Francis Gage	23 January 1675	2 June 1682	Idem	
James Smith	28 August 1682	13 March 1688	13/20 May 1711	
Edward Paston	29 June 1688	21 July 1714	Idem	
Robert Witham	5 February 1715	29 May 1738	Idem	
William Thornburgh	June 1738	4 March 1750	Idem	
William Green	3 June 1750	1 December 1770	Idem	
Henry Tichborne Blount	22 August 1770	30 May 1781	29 March 1810	Resigned
William Gibson	31 May 1781	12 June 1790	2 June 1821	Resigned
Edward Kitchen	30 July 1790	3 October 1790/1	3 January 1793	Resigned
John Daniel	16 February 1792	3 March 1795	3 October 1823	Fled to London
Francis Tuite				(titular only)
