= William Fulke =

English Puritan divine (1538–1589)

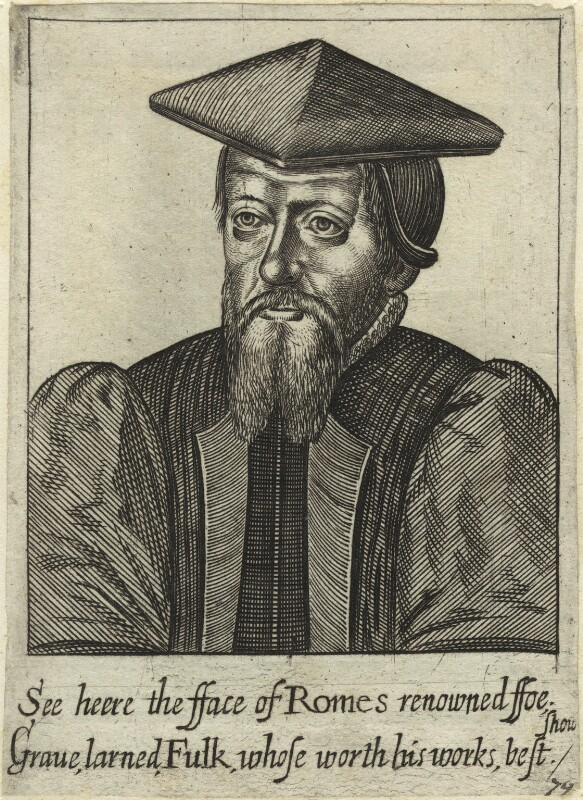
William Fulke.

William Fulke (/fʊlk/; 1538 – buried 28 August 1589) was an English Puritan divine.

== Life ==
Fulke was born in London. His father was Christopher Fulke, the Common Crier and Serjeant at Arms to the Mayor of the City of London. He had a younger brother called Samuel, later rector of Barton-le-Cley in Bedfordshire (living 1614). Fulke married twice. His first wife was Joan Leonard, the sister of the Puritan merchant William Leonard (d. 1598). Joan had died by 1573, when Fulke married Margaret Cotton, on 16 May. According to his will, William and Margaret had sons Christopher and William, and at least two daughters. He made this will on 20 August 1589. It was proved by his wife Margaret the following 8 November.

Fulke was educated at St John's College, Cambridge. He took his BA in 1558, his Ma in 1563, his BD in 1568, and his DD in 1572.

After studying law for six years, he became a fellow at St John's College, Cambridge in 1564. He took a leading part in the vestiarian controversy, and persuaded the college to discard the surplice. In consequence, he was expelled from St John's for a time, but in 1567 he became Hebrew lecturer and preacher there.

After standing unsuccessfully for the headship of the college in 1569, he became chaplain to Robert Dudley, 1st Earl of Leicester, and received from him the livings of Warley, in Essex, and Dennington in Suffolk. In 1578 he was elected master of Pembroke Hall, Cambridge.

As a Puritan controversialist he was remarkably active; in 1580 the bishop of Ely appointed him to defend puritanism against the Roman Catholics, Thomas Watson, ex-Bishop of Lincoln (1513–1584), and John Feckenham, formerly abbot of Westminster, and in 1581 he was one of the disputants with the Jesuit, Edmund Campion, while in 1582 he was among the clergy selected by the privy council to argue against any Roman Catholic.

== Works ==
His numerous polemical writings include A Defense of the Sincere and True Translations of the Holy Scriptures into the English tongue, against the Manifold Cavils, Frivolous Quarrels, and Impudent Slanders of Gregory Martin, one of the Readers of Popish Divinity, in the Traitorous Seminary of Rheims (London, 1583), and confutations of Thomas Stapleton (1535–1598), William Allen and other Roman Catholic controversialists.

In 1589, Fulke published a parallel Bible (Bishops' Bible-Douay–Rheims) with a confutation, amidst the controversy with the papists over Bible translation and the Vulgate tradition. The Bible was entitled, The Text of the New Testament of Jesus Christ, Translated out of the Vulgar Latin ... Whereunto is added the Translation out of the Original Greek, Commonly Used in the Church of England.

Academic offices
Preceded by John Young	Master of Pembroke College, Cambridge; 1578–1589	Succeeded by Lancelot Andrewes
