= Morgan Phillips (priest) =

Morgan Phillips (also Philipps or Philippes) (died 1570) was a Welsh Roman Catholic priest and a benefactor of Douai College.

== Life ==
Born in Monmouthshire, Phillips entered the University of Oxford in 1533, graduating B.A. on 18 February 1538; he was elected a fellow of Oriel College on 17 April 1538. He commenced M.A. on 27 March 1542, was afterwards ordained priest, and later proceeded B.D.

In 1543 Phillips was presented to the rectory of Kiddington, Oxfordshire, and on 5 February 1546 was appointed principal of St Mary Hall, Oxford. He was one of the three prominent Catholics who, in 1549, took part in a public disputation against Pietro Martire Vermigli in the divinity hall of the university, with William Tresham and William Chedsey. In the same year he obtained the vicarage of St Winnoc, Pembrokeshire.

In 1550 Phillips resigned the post of principal of St Mary Hall, and soon after the accession of Queen Mary, in 1553, he became precentor of St David's Cathedral. After his absence from Oriel College for a longer time than was allowed, his fellowship was declared vacant on 20 December 1554.

Declining to accept the religious changes of the reign of Elizabeth I, Phillips left for the continent and settled at Leuven. Soon afterwards he visited Rome with William Allen and Jean Vendeville. On his return to Flanders he worked with Allen to establish an English seminary college at Douai; and he advanced the first sum of money for it. Owen Lewis, then at the University of Douai, joined them in a close group of friends.

Phillips died at Douai College on 18 August 1570. By his will he left to Allen all his property, which was used to enlarge the college. Under his name as author was republished in 1571 the Treatise of John Lesley on Mary, Queen of Scots.

== Notes ==
Attribution

This article incorporates text from a publication now in the public domain: Lee, Sidney, ed. (1896). "Philipps, Morgan". Dictionary of National Biography. Vol. 45. London: Smith, Elder & Co.
