= John Bridgewater =

John Bridgewater (c 1532 – 1596) was an English clerical historian of the Catholic Confessors under Queen Elizabeth I.

== Biography ==
Bridgewater was born in Yorkshire about 1532; died probably at Trier, about 1596. He proceeded M. A. at Oxford University in 1556, was ordained as a priest. In 1563 he became Rector of Lincoln College in that university. In 1574, he resigned these and several other important preferments, and crossed over to Douai along with several of his students, in order to practice Catholicism more freely.

He probably never returned to England but lived at various Catholic places on the European continent (Reims, Paris, Rome, Trier); in 1588 and 1594 he resided at Trier. Pedro de Ribadeneira, Nathaniel Bacon, and Henry Foley account him a member of the Society of Jesus; the Catholic Encyclopedia argues that they have no proof of this.

== Writings ==
Bridgewater refuted (Trier 1589) a Protestant work on the pope as Antichrist and also wrote "Account of the Six Articles usually Proposed to the Missioners that Suffered in England". He voted this in 1562.

He may be best known as the earliest martyrologist of Catholic England. His work, conceived in the spirit of Eusebius as a triumphant apology for Catholicism, is entitled Concertatio Ecclesliae Catholicae in Angliâ adversus Calvinopapistas et Puritanos sub Elizabethâ Reginâ quorundam hominum doctrina et sanctitate illustrium renovata et recognita, etc., i.e. The Battle of the Catholic Faith in England under Queen Elizabeth, renewed in the lives of certain men illustrious for learning and sanctity, among them more than one hundred martyrs, and a very great number of others distinguished for their (religious) deeds and sufferings; confirmed also by the retractations of apostates, by new edicts of the persecutors, and by the writings of very learned Catholics against the Anglican, or rather female, pontificate, and in defense of the authority of the Roman pontiff over Christian princes (Trier, 1588, about 850 pp. in octavo).

Another edition was brought out by William Allen in 1594; it served thenceforth as an original record of the persecutions of English Catholics. Hugh Tootell, Richard Challoner, and John Lingard draw on it extensively for biographical and historical data. Its rather miscellaneous contents are described in the Chetham Society's Remains (XLVIII, 47-50).

He also wrote Confutatio virulentae disputationis theologicae (1589).
