= Pope Sixtus V =

Head of the Catholic Church from 1585 to 1590

- Bishop of Rome
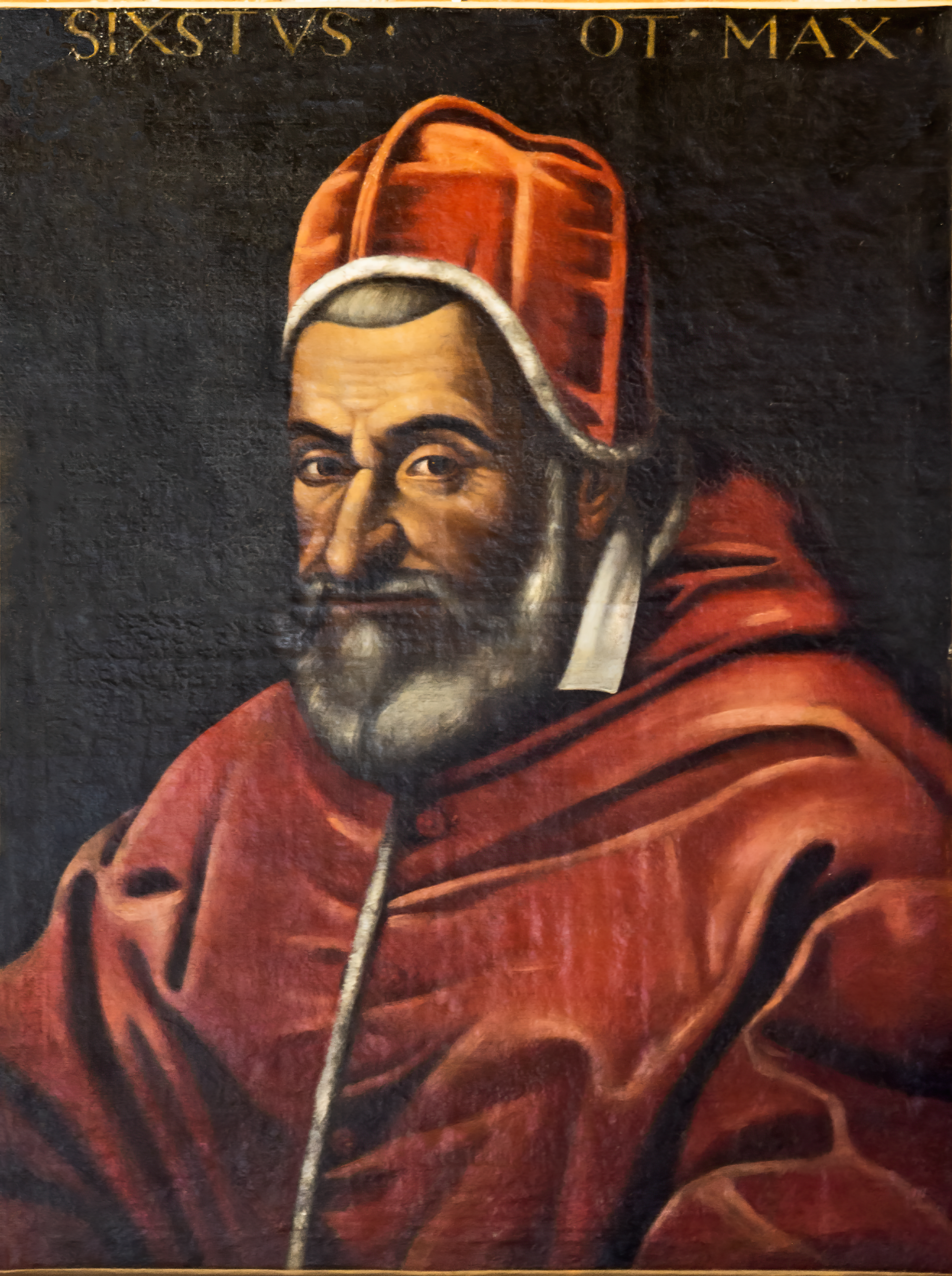
- Church: Catholic Church
- Papacy began: 24 April 1585
- Papacy ended: 27 August 1590
- Predecessor: Gregory XIII
- Successor: Urban VII
- Previous posts: Bishop of Fermo (1571–1577); Bishop of Sant'Agata de' Goti (1566–1571); Cardinal-Priest of San Girolamo degli Illirici (1570–1585)

Orders
- Ordination: 1547
- Consecration: 12 January 1567 by Antonio Lauro
- Created cardinal: 17 May 1570 by Pius V

Personal details
- Born: Felice Piergentile, then Felice Peretti; 13 December 1521 Grottammare, Papal States
- Died: 27 August 1590 (aged 68) Rome, Papal States
- Motto: Aqua et panis, vita canis (Water and bread are a dog's life)
- Signature: Sixtus V's signature

- Coat of arms: Sixtus V's coat of arms

Papal styles of Pope Sixtus V
- Reference style: His Holiness
- Spoken style: Your Holiness
- Religious style: Holy Father
- Posthumous style: None

Pope Sixtus V (Italian: Sisto V; 13 December 1521 – 27 August 1590), born Felice Piergentile, was head of the Catholic Church and ruler of the Papal States from 24 April 1585 to his death in August 1590. As a youth, he joined the Franciscan order, where he displayed talents as a scholar and preacher, and enjoyed the patronage of Pius V, who made him a cardinal. As a cardinal, he was known as Cardinal Montalto.

As Pope, he energetically rooted out corruption and lawlessness across Rome, and launched a far-sighted rebuilding programme that continues to provoke controversy, as it involved the destruction of antiquities. The cost of these works was met by heavy taxation, which caused much suffering. His foreign policy was regarded as over-ambitious; he excommunicated King Henry IV of France and renewed the excommunication of Queen Elizabeth I of England. He is recognized as a significant figure of the Counter-Reformation. He is the most recent pope to date to take on the pontifical name "Sixtus".

== Early life ==
Felice Piergentile was born on 13 December 1521 at Grottammare, in the Papal States, to Francesco Piergentile (also known as Peretto di Montalto, from Montalto delle Marche), and Mariana da Frontillo. His father had taken refuge in Grottammare to escape the oppression of the duke of Urbino, finding there a job as a gardener. Sixtus was the last pope from such a poor background until Pius X was elected in 1903.

Felice later adopted Peretti as his family name in 1551, and as a cardinal was known as "Cardinal Montalto" (to reflect his affection for his homeland).

=== Franciscan ===
At the age of 9 years, Felice returned to Montalto to join his uncle in the Franciscan Convent of San Francesco delle Fratte. At the age of 12, he was initiated as a novice of the Franciscan Order, assuming the name of Fra Felice (Friar Felix) in 1535, maintaining his birth name. From this year, he started philosophical and theological studies, moving between different convents of the Order. He finally completed his studies in the Franciscan Magna Domus of Bologna in September 1544. Three years earlier he had been ordained as a deacon.

About 1552 he was noticed by Cardinal Rodolfo Pio da Carpi, Protector of the Franciscan order, Cardinal Ghislieri (later Pope Pius V) and Cardinal Carafa (later Pope Paul IV), and from that time his advancement was assured. He was sent to Venice as inquisitor general of the Venetian Holy Inquisition, but was so severe and conducted matters in such a high-handed manner that he became embroiled in quarrels. In 1560, the Venetian government asked for his recall.

After a brief term as procurator of his order, he was attached in 1565 to the papal legation to Spain headed by Cardinal Ugo Boncompagni (later Pope Gregory XIII) which was sent to investigate a charge of heresy levelled against Bartolomé Carranza, Archbishop of Toledo. The violent dislike which Peretti conceived for Boncompagni had a marked influence on his subsequent actions. He hurried back to Rome upon the accession of Pius V, who made him apostolic vicar of his order and then, in 1570, cardinal.

=== Cardinal ===
During the pontificate of his political enemy Gregory XIII (1572–1585), Cardinal Montalto, as he was generally called, lived in enforced retirement, occupied with the care of his property, the Villa Montalto, erected by Domenico Fontana close to the cardinal's church on the Esquiline Hill, overlooking the ancient Baths of Diocletian. The first phase (1576–1580) of the building was enlarged after Peretti became pope and was able to clear buildings to open four new streets in 1585–86. The villa contained two residences, the Palazzo Sistino or "Palazzo di Termini" (Note: "Termini" was the name given to that district, derived in turn from the ruins of the immense Baths of Diocletian (in Latin, thermae)) and the casino, called the Palazzetto Montalto e Felice.

This clearance programme was an undoubted gain in the relief it brought to the congestion of the crowded medieval city. Clearly, however, Romans displaced by it were furious, and resentment was still felt centuries later until the decision was taken to build Roma Termini railway station, inaugurated by Pope Pius IX in 1863, on the site of the Villa, which became doomed to destruction.

Cardinal Montalto's other occupation at this period was with his studies, one of the fruits of which was an edition of the works of Ambrose. As pope, he would personally supervise the printing of an improved edition of Jerome's Vulgate.

== Papacy ==
=== Election as pope ===
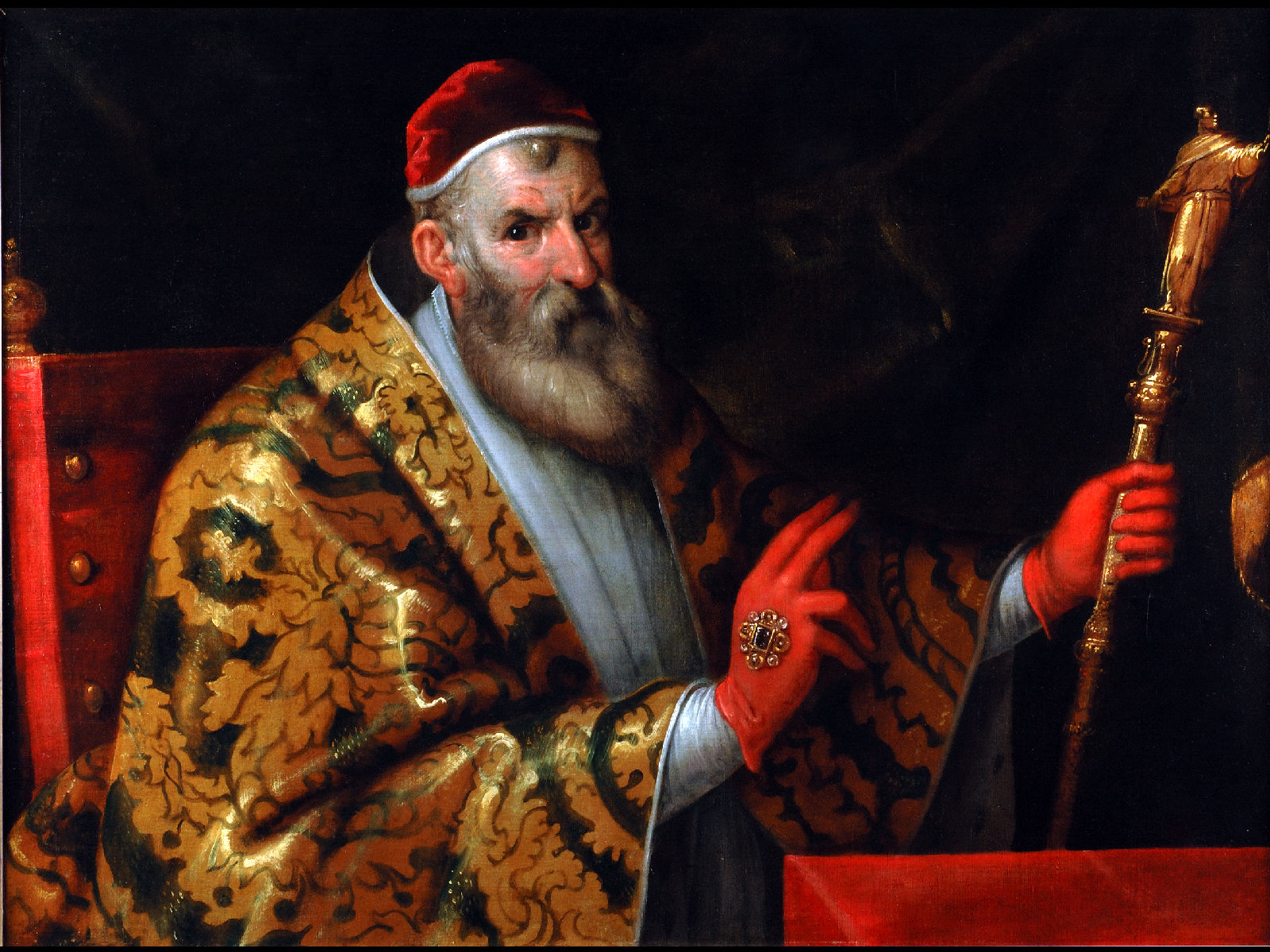
Portrait of Sixtus V by Filippo Bellini, c. 1585-1590

Though not neglecting to follow the course of affairs, Felice carefully avoided every occasion of offence. This discretion contributed not a little to his election to the papacy on 24 April 1585, with the title of Sixtus V to honour Pope Sixtus IV, also a Franciscan like himself. One of the things that commended his candidacy to certain cardinals may have been his physical vigour, which seemed to promise a long pontificate. His papal coronation was held on 1 May 1585 and he was crowned by the protodeacon Ferdinando de' Medici.

=== Reforms in the city of Rome ===
The terrible condition in which Pope Gregory XIII had left the Papal States called for prompt and stern measures. Sixtus proceeded against the prevailing lawlessness with severity. Thousands of brigands were brought to justice: within a short time, the country was again quiet and safe. It was claimed that there were more heads on spikes across the Ponte Sant'Angelo than melons for sale in the marketplace. Clergy and nuns were also executed if they broke their vows of chastity.

Next, Sixtus set to work to repair the finances. By the sale of offices, the establishment of a new "Monti" and by levying new taxes, he accumulated a vast surplus, which he stored up against certain specified emergencies, such as a crusade or the defence of the Holy See. Sixtus prided himself upon his hoard, but the method by which it had been amassed was financially unsound: some of the taxes proved ruinous, and the withdrawal of so much money from circulation could not fail to cause distress.

Immense sums were spent upon public works, in carrying through the comprehensive planning that had come to fruition during his retirement, bringing water to the waterless hills via his new aqueduct, the Acqua Felice which fed twenty-seven new fountains; laying out new arteries in Rome, which connected the great basilicas, even setting his engineer-architect Domenico Fontana to replan the Colosseum as a silk-spinning factory housing its workers.

Inspired by the ideal of the Renaissance city, Pope Sixtus V's ambitious urban reform programme transformed the old environment to emulate the "long straight streets, wide regular spaces, uniformity and repetitiveness of structures, lavish use of commemorative and ornamental elements, and maximum visibility from both linear and circular perspective." The Pope set no limit to his plans, and achieved much in his short pontificate, always carried through at top speed: the completion of the dome of St. Peter's; the loggia of Sixtus in the Basilica di San Giovanni in Laterano; the chapel of the Praesepe in Santa Maria Maggiore; additions or repairs to the Quirinal, Lateran and Vatican palaces; the erection of four obelisks, including that in Saint Peter's Square; the opening of six streets; the restoration of the aqueduct of Septimius Severus ("Acqua Felice"); the integration of the Leonine City in Rome as XIV rione (Borgo).

Besides numerous roads and bridges, he improved the city's air by financing the reclamation of the Pontine Marshes. Good progress was made, with more than 9,500 acres (38 km^{2}) reclaimed and opened to agriculture and manufacture. The project was abandoned upon his death.

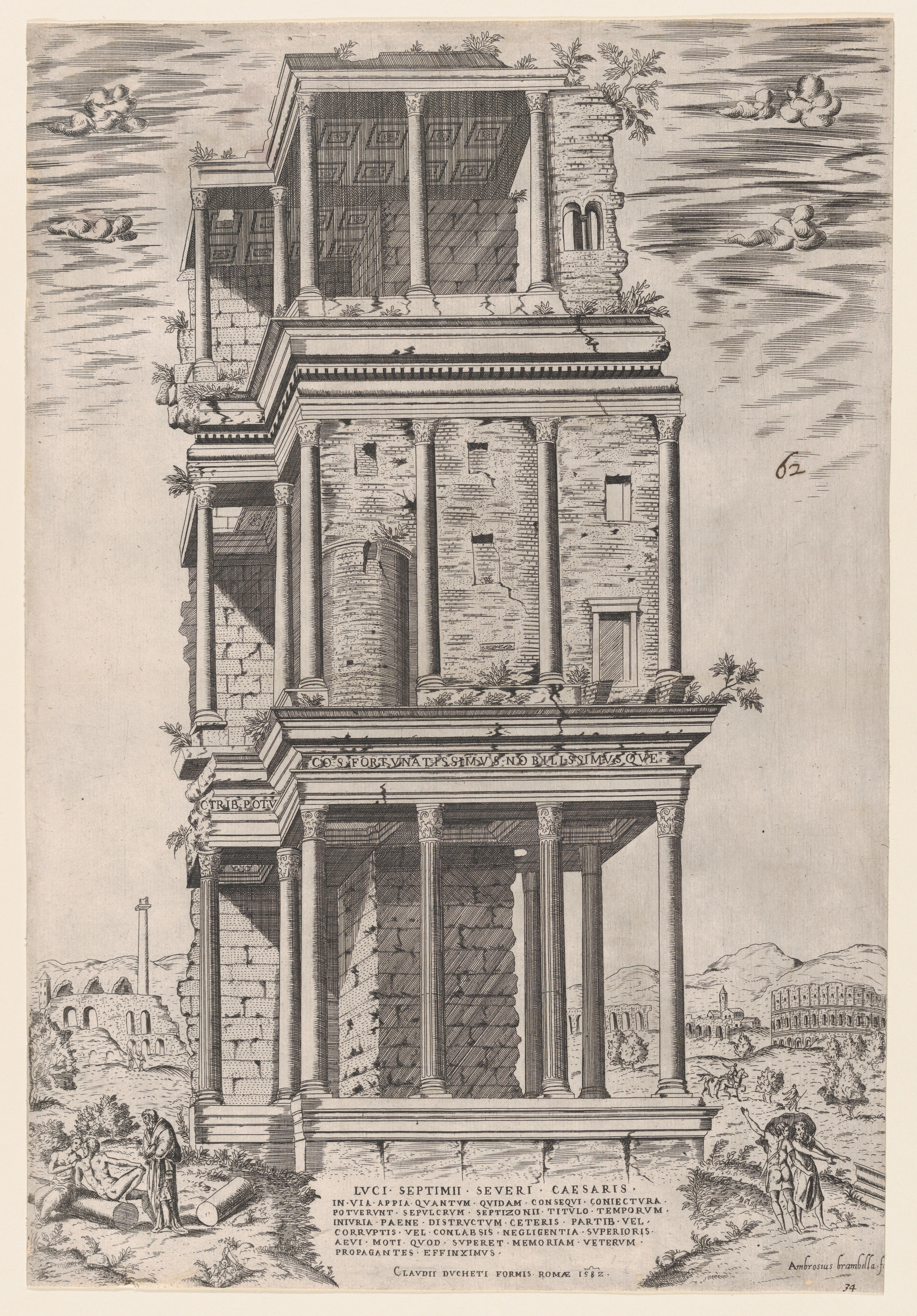
A fragment of the Septizonium is shown in this engraving dating to 1582.

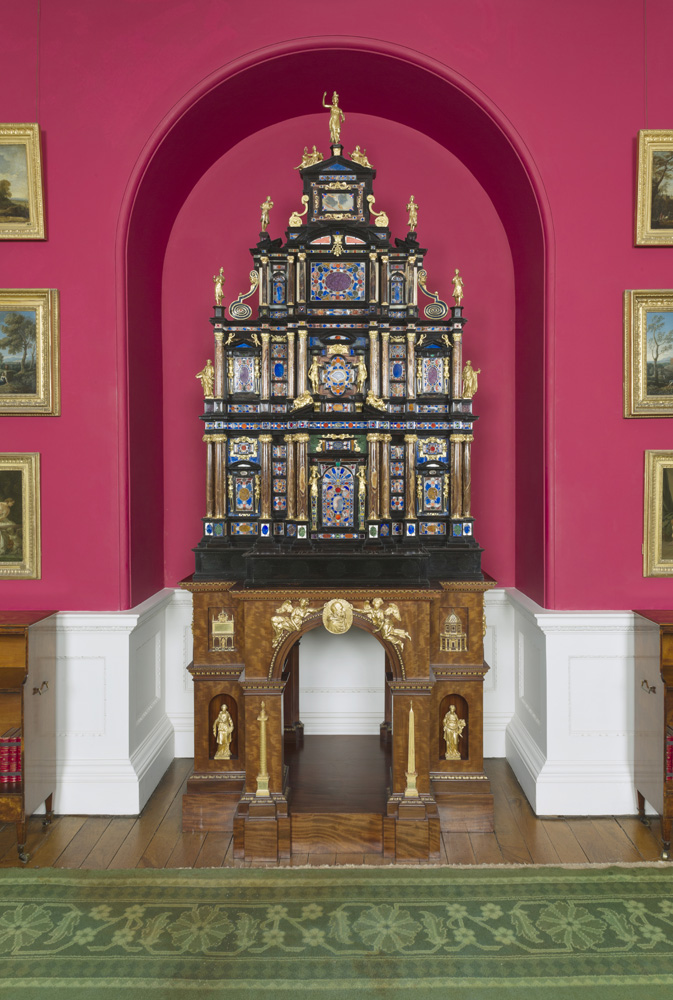
Pope's Cabinet at Stourhead, built for Sixtus V

Sixtus had no appreciation of antiquities, which were employed as raw material to serve his urbanistic and Christianising programs: Trajan's Column and the Column of Marcus Aurelius (at the time misidentified as the Column of Antoninus Pius) were made to serve as pedestals for the statues of SS Peter and Paul; the Minerva of the Capitol was converted into an emblem of Christian Rome; the Septizodium of Septimius Severus was demolished for building materials. When he was taken to a cross in a church in Rome that was supposedly miraculously bleeding, Sixtus suspected that it was a fake. He took an axe and said, "As Christ I adore you; as wood I cut you". He split the cross and revealed that it contained sponges soaked in blood within it.

The spatial organization, monumental inscriptions and restorations throughout the city reinforced the control, surveillance, and authority that alluded to his power.

=== Church administration ===
The subsequent administrative system of the Catholic Church owed much to Sixtus. He limited the College of Cardinals to seventy. He doubled the number of the congregations and enlarged their functions, assigning to them the principal role in the transaction of business (1588). He regarded the Jesuits with disfavour and suspicion. He considered radical changes to their constitution, but death prevented the execution of his purpose.

In 1588, he established the 15 congregations by his constitution Immensa Aeterni Dei.

=== Sixtine Vulgate and Septuagint ===
In May 1587, the Sixtine Septuagint was published under the auspices of Sixtus V.

In May 1590 the Sixtine Vulgate was issued. The edition was preceded by the Bull Aeternus ille, in which the Pope declared the authenticity of the new Bible. The bull stipulated "that it was to be considered as the authentic edition recommended by the Council of Trent, that it should be taken as the standard of all future reprints, and that all copies should be corrected by it." "This edition was not to be reprinted for 10 years except at the Vatican, and after that any edition must be compared with the Vatican edition, so that "not even the smallest particle should be altered, added or removed" under pain of the "greater excommunication." Jaroslav Pelikan, without giving any more details, says that this edition "proved to be so defective that it was withdrawn".

=== Consistories ===
Sixtus V created 33 cardinals in eight consistories during his reign, which included his grandnephew Alessandro Peretti di Montalto and his future successor Ippolito Aldobrandini, who would later become Pope Clement VIII.

=== Beatifications and canonizations ===
During his pontificate, Sixtus V beatified Ubaldesca Taccini (1587) and canonized one saint, Didacus of Alcalá (10 July 1588).

=== Roman Curia ===
In 1588, Sixtus V published the bull Immensa Aeterni Dei which reorganised the Roman Curia into departments.

=== Foreign relations ===
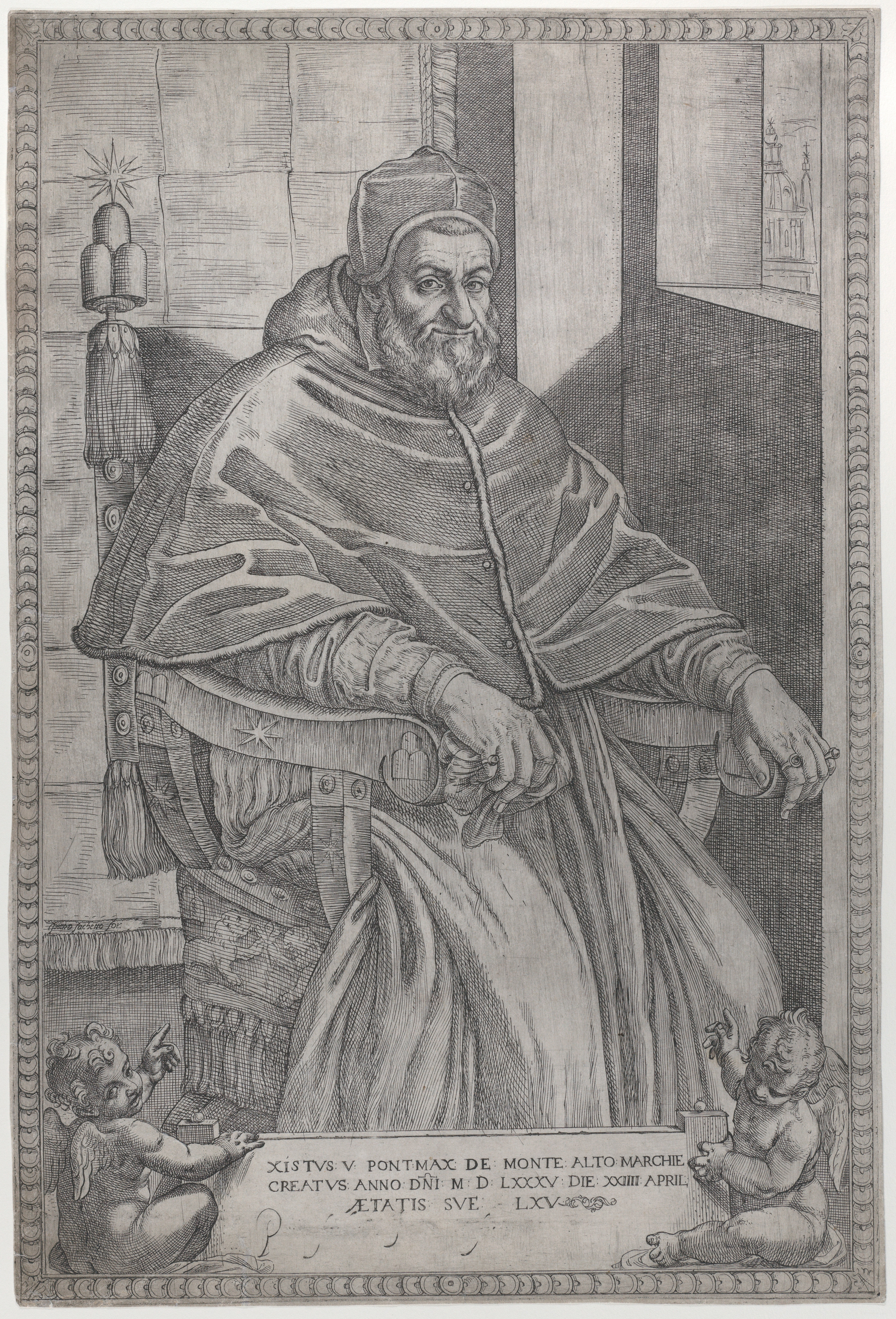
Sixtus V in an engraving of Pietro Facchetti (1585)

In his larger political relations, Sixtus entertained fantastic ambitions, such as the annihilation of the Turks, the conquest of Egypt, the transport of the Holy Sepulchre to Italy, and the accession of his nephew to the throne of France. The situation in which he found himself was difficult: he could not countenance the designs of those he considered as heretical princes, and yet he mistrusted King Philip II of Spain and viewed with apprehension any extension of his power.

Sixtus agreed to renew the excommunication of Queen Elizabeth I of England, and to grant a large subsidy to the Armada of Philip II, but, knowing the slowness of Spain, would give nothing until the expedition actually landed in England. This way, he saved a fortune that would otherwise have been lost in the failed campaign. Sixtus had Cardinal William Allen draw up the An Admonition to the Nobility and People of England and Ireland, a proclamation to be published in England if the invasion had been successful. The extant document comprised all that could be said against Elizabeth I, and the indictment is therefore fuller and more forcible than any other put forward by the religious exiles, who were generally reticent in their complaints. Allen carefully consigned his publication to the fire, and it is only known of through one of Elizabeth's spies, who had stolen a copy.

Sixtus excommunicated King Henry III of Navarre, who was the heir presumptive to the throne of France, and contributed to the Catholic League, but he chafed under his forced alliance with King Philip II of Spain, and looked for an escape. The victories of Henry and the prospect of his conversion to Catholicism raised Sixtus V's hopes, and to a corresponding degree determined Philip II to tighten his grip upon his wavering ally. The Pope's negotiations with Henry's representative evoked a bitter and menacing protest and a categorical demand for the performance of promises. Sixtus took refuge in evasion and temporised until his death on 27 August 1590.

=== Contraception, abortion, and adultery ===
Sixtus extended the penalty of excommunication relating to the Roman Catholic Church's teaching on contraception and on abortion. While the Church taught that abortion and contraception were gravely sinful actions, it did not apply to all mortal sins the additional penalty of excommunication.

Some theologians argued that only after proof of the "quickening" (when the mother can feel the fetus's movement in her womb, usually about 20 weeks into gestation) was there incontrovertible evidence that ensoulment had already occurred. Until Sixtus V, canon lawyers had applied the code from Gratian whereby excommunications were only given to abortions after the quickening. In 1588 the pope issued a papal bull, Effraenatam or Effrenatam ("Without Restraint"), which declared that the canonical penalty of excommunication would be levied for any form of contraception and for abortions at any stage in fetal development. The reasoning on the latter would be that the soul of the unborn child would be denied Heaven.

Sixtus also attempted in 1586 to introduce into the secular law in Rome the Old Testament penalty for adultery, which is death. The measure ultimately failed.

=== Death and legacy ===
About 5,000 bandits were executed by Sixtus V in the five years before his death in 1590, but there were reputedly 27,000 more at liberty throughout Central Italy.

As Sixtus V lay on his deathbed, he was loathed by his political subjects, but history has recognized him as one of the most important popes. On the negative side, he could be impulsive, obstinate, severe, and autocratic. On the positive side, he was open to large ideas and threw himself into his undertakings with energy and determination; this often led to success. His pontificate saw great enterprises and great achievements.

The pope became ill with a fever on 24 August, which intensified the following day. Sixtus V died on 27 August 1590.

== See also ==
- Cardinals created by Sixtus V

== Sources ==
- Ott, Michael (1912). "Pope Sixtus V" . In Herbermann, Charles (ed.). Catholic Encyclopedia. Vol. 14. New York: Robert Appleton Company.
- Leti, Gregorio; Farneworth, Ellis (1779). The Life of Pope Sixtus the Fifth. Dublin.
- Tempesti, Casamiro (1754). Storia della vita e geste di Sisto quinto, vol. I. Rome.
- Koenigsberger, H.G. (1968). "IX: Western Europe and the Power of Spain". In Wernham, R.B. (ed.). The New Cambridge Modern History. Vol. III: The Counter-Reformation and Price Revolution, 1559–1610. Cambridge University Press. pp. 234–318.304

Catholic Church titles
Preceded by Gregory XIII	Pope; 24 April 1585 – 27 August 1590	Succeeded by Urban VII
