= Richard Barret (divine) =

Richard Barret, D.D. (d. 1599), was an English Catholic divine and second president of Douai College.

== Biography ==
Barret was born in Warwickshire, and entered the English college at Douay 28 January 1576. He moved in 1582 to the English college at Rome, where he took his doctor's degree. In the same year, on the invitation of William Allen, he went to Rheims, and was appointed to the important post of superintendent of the studies of the college which had been removed to that city from Douay.

Allen, on being created a cardinal, continued for a time to govern the seminary, but during his absence in Rome dissensions arose, and it became necessary for him to appoint a resident superior. Accordingly, by an instrument dated Rome, 31 October 1588, after mentioning that various 'complaints had been made to him of scandals which had arisen among its members, and defects against the college discipline', he nominated Dr. Barret to be president of the college. This appointment, which is said to have been due to the influence of the Jesuits, was by no means a fortunate one, as the new president was far more fit to fill a subordinate post than that of superior.

Nicholas Fitzherbert, who knew him personally, says that 'he was an excellent man, of great learning and piety, who had lived some years at Rome, and for a long time at Rheims under Allen's government, but he was naturally a little too severe and hot-tempered. This impetuosity, till then latent, showed itself more freely when he was raised to command, ... and he thereby gave offence to many of the scholars, and roused such commotions that Allen was hardly able by many letters, reproofs, and punishments, to restore peace'. In consequence of political troubles it was resolved to return to Douay, where the college still retained possession of the house and garden in which the work had originally begun. During the course of that year some of the students were sent to England, others to Rome, others to Spain; but the greater part of them migrated to Douay. On 23 June 1593 Dr. Barret left Rheims for Douay, where he continued to govern the college till his death on 30 May 1599. His successor was Dr. Thomas Worthington.
