= Francis Gage =

English Roman Catholic priest

Francis Gage (1621–1682) was an English Roman Catholic priest, who became President of the English College, Douai.

== Life ==
Born 1 February 1621, he was son of John Gage of Haling, Surrey, by his second wife, Mrs. Barnes, a widow. He was half-brother of Sir Henry Gage, governor of Oxford, of George Gage and of Thomas Gage, missionary and traveller. He was a student in the English College, Douay from 1630 to 1641, when he went to Paris to pursue theological studies under William Clifford at Tournai College, which had been granted by Cardinal Richelieu to Richard Smith for the education of the English clergy.

In 1646 he was ordained priest, and in 1648 appointed tutor to Thomas Arundel, then residing in Paris. He graduated B.D. at the Sorbonne in 1649, and D.D. in 1654. He then came to the English mission, was appointed archdeacon of Essex, and resided with Lady Herbert, whom he afterwards accompanied to France. He then went to Rome in 1659 as agent to Old Chapter. He remained in Rome until his recall in 1661, and then returned to the English mission. He was chaplain to Lady Strangford from 1663 to 1667, and afterwards tutor to Philip Draycot of Paynsley, Staffordshire, whom he accompanied on a Grand Tour.

On 23 January 1676 he was nominated President of Douai College, in succession to John Leyburn. The college flourished prospered until 1678 and the fabricated Popish Plot scare; from which it recovered. Gage died on 2 June 1682.

== Works ==
He wrote ‘Journal of the Chief Events of his Life, from his Birth in 1621 to 1627,’ autograph manuscript, in the archives of the Old Chapter. Thompson Cooper in the Dictionary of National Biography states that Gage was the ‘F. G.’ who edited ‘The Spiritual Exercises of … Gertrude More, of the … English Congregation of our Ladies of Comfort in Cambray,’ Paris, 1658.
