= An Admonition to the Nobility and People of England and Ireland =

1588 treatise by William Allen

An Admonition to the Nobility and People of England and Ireland concerning the present wars, made from the execution of his holiness' sentence, by the highe and mightie King Catholike of Spaine
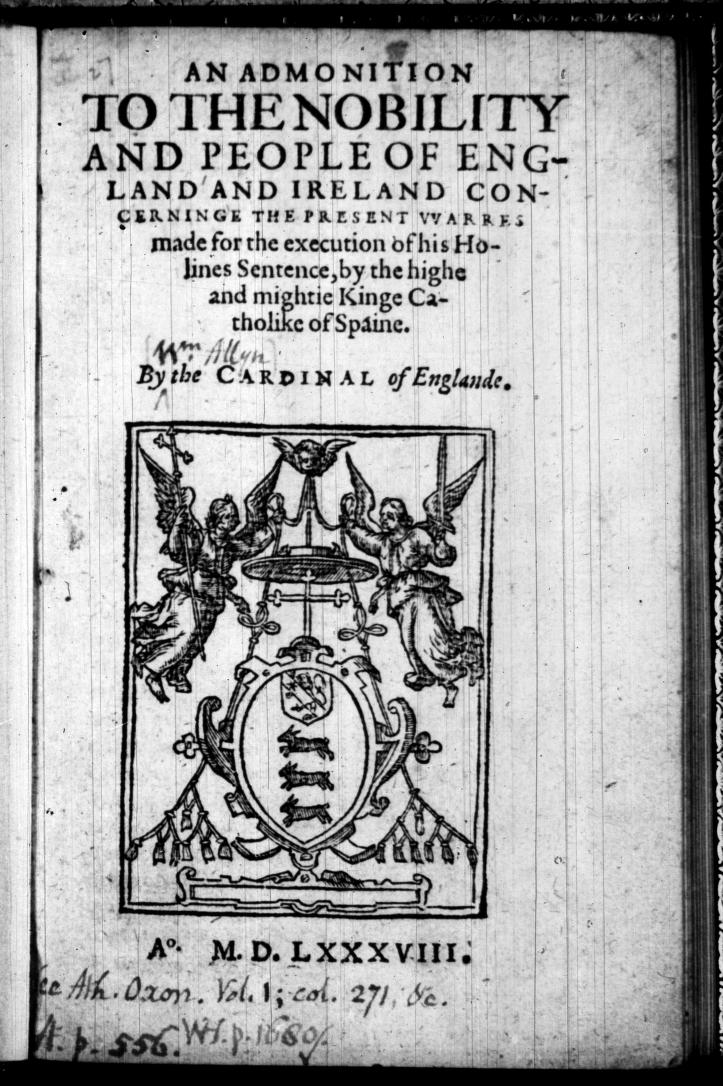
- Author: Cardinal William Allen
- Language: English
- Genre: Treatise
- Publication date: 1588
- Publication place: Kingdom of England

An Admonition to the Nobility and People of England and Ireland concerning the present wars, made from the execution of his holiness' sentence, by the highe and mightie King Catholike of Spaine (1588) was a treatise written by Cardinal William Allen in an attempt to raise Elizabeth I's Catholic subjects against her while the Spanish Armada mounted their invasion of England. The publication was a scathing attack on Elizabeth, her ancestry and her legitimacy. Allen wrote that Elizabeth was "known for [being] an incestuous bastard, begotten and born in sin of an infamous courtesan Anne Boleyn". It was intended for distribution just after the Armada. It has been described as "vituperative billingsgate"

However, the majority of English Catholics refused to betray their queen. Seeing the Armada as predominantly politically (rather than religiously) motivated, they felt no obligation to support the arriving Spanish. The publication was an embarrassment to politically loyal Catholics in England, particularly after the dramatic failure of the Armada.

Upon the defeat of the Spanish Armada, Allen carefully consigned his publication to the fire, and it is known only through one of Elizabeth's spies, who had stolen a copy.
