= Thomas Stapleton (theologian) =

English Roman Catholic priest (1535–1598)

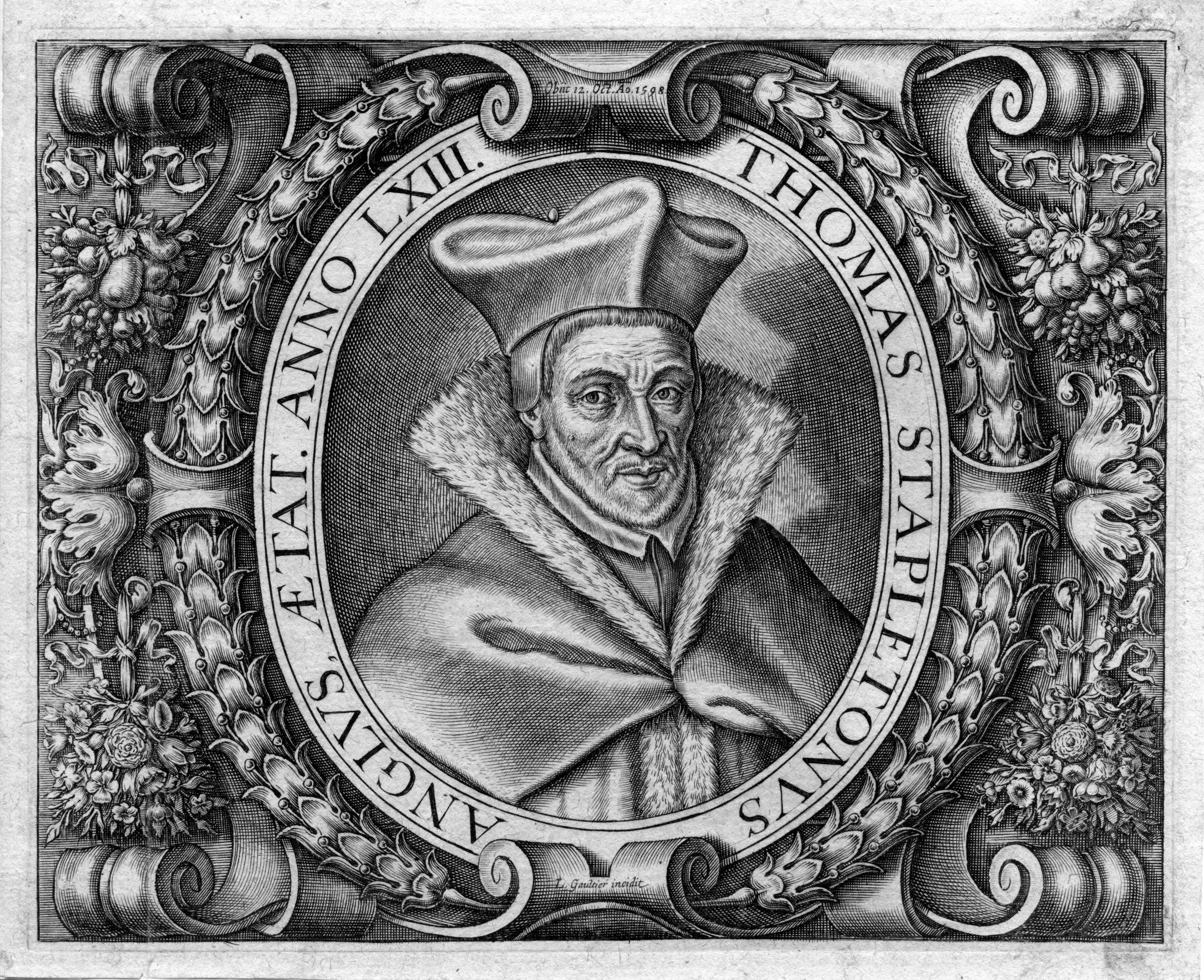
- Born: July 1535; Henfield, Sussex
- Died: 12 October 1598 (aged 62–63); Leuven, Spanish Netherlands
- Education: Old University of Leuven
- Occupation: Theologian, university teacher, writer
- Employer: Old University of Leuven; University of Douai

Thomas Stapleton (Henfield, Sussex, July 1535 – Leuven, 12 October 1598) was an English Catholic priest and controversialist.

== Life ==
He was the son of William Stapleton, one of the Stapletons of Carlton, Yorkshire. He was educated at the Free School, Canterbury, at Winchester College, and at New College, Oxford, where he became a Fellow, 18 January 1553. On Elizabeth I's accession he left England rather than conform to the new religion, going first to Leuven, and afterwards to Paris, to study theology.

In 1563, being in England, he was summoned by the Anglican bishop William Barlow to repudiate the pope's authority, but refused and was deprived of the prebend of Woodhorne in Chichester Cathedral, conferred on him in 1558. He then retired to Leuven with his father and other relatives. In 1568 he joined Cardinal Allen at Douai and took a great part in founding the English College there, both by lecturing and by devoting to its support his salary as lecturer in theology at Anchin College.

He was appointed public professor of divinity, and canon of St. Amatus; and together with Allen he completed the degree of D.D. on 10 July 1571. In 1584 he resigned these preferments to enter the Society of Jesus, but did not complete his novitiate, and returned to Douai. Philip II of Spain appointed him professor of Scripture at the Catholic University of Leuven in 1590, to which office a canonry in St. Peter's Church was annexed; and soon after he was made dean of Hilverenbeeck in the Roman Catholic Diocese of 's-Hertogenbosch. The emoluments of these offices were all spent in relieving needy English Catholics. Meanwhile, his fame as a theologian had spread to Rome and Pope Clement VIII thought so much of his theological writings that he caused them to be read aloud at his table. Twice he invited Stapleton to Rome in vain, but his offer to make him prothonotary Apostolic in January 1597, was accepted. It was generally believed that he would be created cardinal, a suggestion which was disapproved of by Alfonso Agazzari, S.J., rector of the English College, and obstacles were put in the way of his journey to Rome (Eley, "Certaine Briefe Notes", p. 254). He accordingly remained in Leuven till his death in the following year. He left his books and manuscripts (now lost) to the English College at Douai. An original painting of Stapleton is preserved at Douai Abbey, Woolhampton, England.

== Works ==
His first works were translations: St. Bede the Venerable's "History of the Church in England" (the very first English translation; Antwerp, 1565), the "Apologie" of the German nobleman and Lutheran-to-Catholic convert Friedrich Staphylus (Antwerp, 1565), and Cardinal Stanislaus Hosius's short "Of the Expresse Word of God" (1567).

He published numerous original works, among which are:

- A Fortress of the Faith (Antwerp) contains the earliest use of the term "Huguenots" and possibly also "Puritan";
- A Return of Untruths (Antwerp, 1566);
- A Counterblast to M. Horne's vain blast (Louvain, 1567);
- Orationes funebres (Antwerp, 1577);
- Principiorum fidei doctrinalium demonstratio (Paris, 1578);
- Speculum pravitatis hæreticæ (Douai, 1580);
- De universa justificationis doctrina (Paris, 1582); "Tres Thomæ" (Douai, 1588);
- Promptuarium morale in two parts (Antwerp, 1591, 1592);
- Promptuarium Catholicum in Evangelia Dominicalia (Cologne, 1592);
- Promptuarium Catholicum in Evangelia Ferialia (Cologne, 1594) and "Promptuarium Catholicum in Evangelia Festorum" (Cologne, 1592);
- Promptvarivm morale svper Evangelia dominicalia totivs anni (Antwerpen, 1593) available via KU Leuven Special Collections;
- Relectio scholastica (Antwerp, 1592); "Authoritatis Ecclesiasticæ circa S. Scripturarum approbationem defensio" (Antwerp, 1592);
- Apologia pro rege Philippo II (Constance, 1592), published under the penning pseudonym of Didymus Veridicus Henfildanus, i.e., Thomas the Stable-toned [truth-speaking] Henfieldite;
- Antidota Evangelica,
- Antidota Apostolica contra nostri Temporis Hæreses (both at Antwerp, 1595);
- Antidota Apostolica in Epistolam Pauli ad Romanos (Antwerp, 1595);
- Triplicatio inchoata (Antwerp, 1596);
- Antidota Apostolica in duas Epistolas ad Corinthios (Antwerp, 1598);
- Orationes catecheticæ (Antwerp, 1598);
- Vere admiranda, seu de Magnitudine Romanæ Ecclesiæ (Antwerp, 1599 and Roma, 1600 available via KU Leuven Special Collections);
- Orationes academicæ miscellaneæ (Antwerp, 1602);
- Oratio academica (Mainz, 1608).

All his works were republished in four folio volumes in Paris in 1620, with an autobiography of the author in Latin verse and Henry Holland's Vita Thomæ Stapletoni. These volumes include Latin translations of Stapleton’s English works, too.

A critical, annotated edition of Stapleton's correspondence with the Flemish printer Jan Moretus was published in Humanistica Lovaniensia in 1996.
