= Thomas Worthington (Douai) =

English Catholic priest and college president

Thomas Worthington, D.D. (1549 at Blainscough Hall, near Wigan, Lancashire - possibly 1627, at Biddulph Hall, Staffordshire) was an English Catholic priest and third President of Douai College.

== Life ==
A member of an ancient and wealthy family, he studied at Brasenose College, Oxford (1566–70), where he graduated in arts (17 October 1570). In February 1573, he went to Douai College to study theology.

He visited England (November 1575), to induce his father, who was an occasional conformist, to remove into foreign parts. After his ordination (6 April 1577), he remained teaching the Roman catechism at Douai till September, 1578, and proceeded B. D. at the University of Douai (January 1579).

After ten months in England, he returned to Reims, accompanied William Allen to Rome, and set out again for England, January 1580. He laboured assiduously and successfully, being especially remembered for what the Catholic Encyclopedia of 1913 calls "his zeal in instructing the ignorant poor".

He assisted Gregory Martin in the translation of the Douay-Rheims Bible, which was also worked on by others at Douai, notably Allen, William Reynolds and Richard Bristow.

In February 1584, when his four nephews, whom he was conveying to Reims, were seized at Great Sankey near Warrington, he managed to escape detection, and to elude the vigilance of his enemies until July, when he was betrayed by a young man whom he had befriended, and seized at his lodgings in Islington. The Lord Treasurer committed him to the Tower of London, where he was confined in the "pit" for over two months. In January 1585, with twenty other priests, he was put aboard ship by the queen's warrant of perpetual banishment, and conveyed to Normandy.

For the next two years he expounded Holy Scripture at Reims. Sir William Stanley turned traitor in January 1587, and with his Irish regiment entered the Spanish service; on 27 April Worthington became their chaplain at Deventer. He was recalled to Reims on 27 January 1589, to undertake the offices of vice-president and procurator, but resumed his post as chaplain to the regiment at Brussels in July, 1591. He was honoured with the doctorate of divinity in 1588 in the Jesuit college at the University of Trier.

On the death of Dr. Richard Barret (30 May 1599) Worthington was appointed President of Douai College (28 June), by the cardinal protector, chiefly through the influence of Robert Persons, the nominee of the secular clergy being rejected. The task to which he was set was a difficult one, and he appears to have lacked strength of character to cope with it. Since the return of the college from Reims in 1593 its embarrassments had continually increased, and this condition reacted upon the discipline. Worthington himself had in 1596 addressed a memorial to the cardinal protector on the state of the Roman College, in which he calls attention to the decline of Douai, which he ascribes to the innovations of Dr. Barrett.

His presidency accordingly began with a pontifical visitation of the college, as a result of which new constitutions were drawn up in Rome. It was enacted that not more than sixty persons be supported on the foundation, that no student be admitted unless fitted to begin rhetoric, and that all students be required to take oath to receive sacred orders in due season. The protector also agreed to Worthington's proposal that a Jesuit be appointed ordinary confessor to the students. This was greatly resented by secular clergy.

Worthington had made a vow to follow Cardinal Allen's guidance, and, after Allen's death, he subjected himself to Father Persons by a like vow (29 December 1596). The clergy saw the influence of the Jesuits in every action of the president, and feared a design to hand over the college to the Society of Jesus.

Confidence was further shaken by Worthington's dismissal of the existing professors, and their replacement by young men who explained their author instead of lecturing. Moreover, priests were hurried to the Mission without adequate preparation or training. The climax was reached after the death of Father Persons (April 1610) when Worthington became reconciled to the archpriest, to whom he offered his resignation.

This was declined, but a conference between three representatives of each met at Douai (May 1612). It petitioned the protector to appoint two of its members to assist the president in reforming the college, but this was met by the protector's "nihil innovandum". This change of policy brought upon Worthington the hostility of the vice-president, Dr. Knatchbull (al. Norton), and of Dr. Singleton, the prefect of studies, and they sent reports derogatory to his conduct and administration to Rome.

There followed another pontifical visitation (October and November 1612), which discovered a truly deplorable condition of affairs. Disunion among the superiors, studies disorganized, discipline relaxed, the buildings out of repair, the appointments deficient, and the finances crippled by a heavy debt. Complaints were raised by the students about the inefficiency of their professors, the influence of the Jesuit confessor, and the interference of the Society in the government of the college.

As a result, Worthington was summoned to Rome (May, 1613) by the cardinal protector, and Matthew Kellison, for whose assistance in reforming the college he had petitioned, was appointed to succeed him (11 November). Worthington was granted an annual pension of 200 crowns, and appointed an Apostolic notary with a place on the Congregation of the Index. While in Rome he became a member of the Oratory. In 1616 he returned to the English Mission and worked in London and in Staffordshire. He was made titular Archdeacon of Nottinghamshire and Derbyshire.

Six months before his death he obtained admission into the Society of Jesus, with permission to make his noviceship upon the mission. The date of his death is given as 1627 in the Catholic Encyclopedia, but as "1622?" in the Dictionary of National Biography, which references Allen's Defence of Sir W. Stanley's Surrender of Deventer, ed. Heywood, p. xlv n. on this point, but also refers to Charles Dodd's Church History of England, which gives the date as "about 1626".

== Works ==
Worthington was the author of:

- The Rosarie of our Ladie, with other Godlie exercises (Antwerp, 1600), a Latin translation of which was also published at Antwerp in 1613;
- Annotations to the Old Testament (Douai, 1609–10);
- A Catalogue of Martyrs in Englande for the profession of the Catholique faith (1535-1608) (Douai, 1608);
- Catalogus martyrum in Anglia (1570-1612) cum narratione de origine seminariorum, et de missione sacerdotum in Anglia (Douai, 1614);
- Whyte dyed Black (1615), against the Calvinist John White;
- An Anker of Christian Doctrine (Douai vere London, 1622).

== Family ==
Worthington's four nephews, who were captured at Great Sankey, 12 February 1584, were Thomas aged 16, Robert aged 15, Richard aged 13, and John aged 11. Their conflict is recorded in Bridgewater's "Concertatio" (1594), translated in Foley's Records of the English Province of the Society of Jesus, Vol. II (1875).

Bandishment, promises, threats, stripes, brutality, and cunning were in turn applied in order to obtain information from them of the whereabouts of their uncle, and the names and practices of their Catholic friends, and to induce them to be present at the heretical worship. After some months all effected their escape.

Thomas was retaken with his uncle at Islington, and remained a prisoner in the Gatehouse for upwards of two and a half years. He afterwards went abroad, married a niece of Cardinal Allen, and died at Louvain in 1619. Robert reached Reims, 22 September 1584, and was joined there by Richard and John on 13 October What they had undergone resulted in the death of Robert, 18 February 1586, and of Richard, 8 June 1586. John became a Jesuit, was the first missioner of the Society who settled in Lancashire, and the founder of the extensive Lancashire district; he died on 25 January 1652.

Another nephew, Peter Worden, son of Thomas's sister Isobel and her husband Lancashire merchant Robert Worden (or Werden), emigrated to New England in the late 1630s and died there, at Yarmouth on Cape Cod, in 1639. His granddaughter Mercy Worden married Kenelm Winslow, nephew of Governor Edward Winslow of Plymouth Colony.

== Sources ==
- Charles Dodd, Church Hist. of England, II (Brussels, 1739), edited by Tierney, III, V (London, 1843)
- John Kirk, Douay Diaries (London, 1878)
- Edwin Burton, Douay Diaries, in Catholic Record Society (London, 1911)
- Henry Foley, Records of the English Province of the Society of Jesus, I, II, VII (London, 1883)
- Joseph Gillow, Biographical Dictionary of English Catholics (London), s.v.
- Anthony Wood, Athenae Oxonienses

== Attribution ==
- This article incorporates text from a publication now in the public domain: Cooper, Thompson (1900). "Worthington, Thomas (1549-1622?)". In Lee, Sidney (ed.). Dictionary of National Biography. Vol. 63. London: Smith, Elder & Co.
