= William Reynolds (theologian) =

English Roman Catholic theologian and Biblical scholar

William Reynolds (also Rainolds, Raynolds, Latin Reginaldus) (c.1544 at Pinhorn near Exeter - 24 August 1594 at Antwerp) was an English Catholic theologian and Biblical scholar.

== Life ==
Educated at Winchester School, he became fellow of New College, Oxford (1560-1572). He was converted to Catholicism partly by the controversy between John Jewel and Thomas Harding, and partly by the personal influence of William Allen.

In 1575 he made a public recantation in Rome, and two years later went to Douai to study for the priesthood. He removed with the other collegians from Douai to Reims in 1578 and was ordained priest at Châlons in April, 1580. He then remained at the college, lecturing on Scripture and Hebrew, and helping Gregory Martin in translating the Reims Testament.

Some years before his death he had left the college to become chaplain to the Beguines at Antwerp.

== Works ==
Reynolds translated several of the writings of Allen and Harding into Latin, and wrote a Refutation of William Whitaker's attack on the Reims version (Paris, 1583). He assisted Gregory Martin in the translation of the Douay-Rheims Bible, which was also worked on by others at Douai, notably Allen, Thomas Worthington and Richard Bristow.

Other works by Reynolds include:

- De justa reipublicæ christianæ in reges impios et hæreticos authoritate (Paris, 1590), under the name of Rossæus
- a treatise on the Blessed Sacrament (Antwerp, 1593)
- Calvino-Turcismus (Antwerp, 1597)

== Family ==
He was the second son of Richard Rainolds, and elder brother of John Rainolds, one of the chief Anglican scholars engaged on the King James Bible.
