= Richard Bristow =

English writer

- Born: Worcester
- Died: October 18, 1581; Harrow on the Hill, London
- Education: Christ Church (MA), University of Oxford

Richard Bristow (1538 at Worcester – 1581 at Harrow on the Hill in London, UK) was an English Catholic controversialist and Biblical scholar.

== Life ==
Richard Bristow was born in 1538 in Worcester, England.

At the age of 17, he studied at the University of Oxford, possibly at Exeter College. In 1559, he gained his bachelor's degree. He continued his studies at Christ Church, Oxford, and gained his MA in 1562.

In 1566, he and Edmund Campion were chosen to hold a public disputation before Queen Elizabeth I of England. After studying theology, Sir William Petre recommended him for a Fellowship at Exeter College; he became a Fellow in 1567.

At this time the Reformation had taken hold in England and the Protestant Queen Elizabeth I had reigned for almost ten years. England had previously been a Catholic country, but many people were changing their religious ideas; Bristow was one of these people. While he stayed loyal to his Catholic faith, he saw the need for changes in the religion.

Two years after his appointment to the fellowship, he left Oxford for Leuven, where he met William Allen. Allen appointed him as the first Prefect of Studies at the new English College, Douai. He was Allen's "right hand upon all occasions", acting as rector when he was absent. The college moved to Reims in 1578.

Bristow is known as a controversial writer and, with Allen, William Reynolds and Thomas Worthington, as one of the revisers of the Douay-Rheims Bible for Catholic readers.

His health began to fail and he was obliged to relinquish his work in 1581. In May of that year, he went to Spa, Belgium but his health did not improve and he was advised to return to England. He arrived in London in September with Jerome Bellamy, and stayed until his death.

Richard Bristow died at the early age of 43 on 18 October 1581. The Douay-Rheims edition of the New Testament was published the year after his death. The full Douay-Rheims Bible was published in 1610.

== Writings ==
- A Briefe Treatise of diuerse and sure wayes to finde out the truthe in this doubtful and dangerous time of Heresie: conteyning sundry worthy Motives to the Catholic faith, or considerations to moue a man to beleue the Catholikes and not the Heretikes (Third edition entitled Motives inducing to the Catholike Faith.)
- Tabula in Summam Theologicam S. Thomae Aquinatis
- A Reply to Will. Fulke
- Demandes to be proponed of Catholikes to the Heretikes
- A Defence of the Bull of Pope Pius V
- Annotations on the Rheims translation of the New Testament
- Carmina Diversa
- Motiva Omnibus Catholicae Doctrinae Orthodoxis Cultoribus pernecessaria

(The last two being left in manuscript.)

== External References ==
- Thomas Worthington, Compendium Vitae Auctoris (prefixed to Motiva)
- Records of the English Catholics, I, II
- Charles Dodd, Church History of England, ed. Tierney (London, 1843)
- Joseph Gillow, Bibl. Dict. Eng. Cath.
- Anthony Wood, Athenae Oxonienses
- John Pitts, De Angliae Scriptoribus
