= English College, Douai =

Catholic seminary in Douai, France (1568–1793)

Coordinates: 50.369621°N 3.085944°E

English College of Douai
- Collège anglais de Douai
- Type: Seminary
- Active: 1568–1793
- Parent institution: University of Douai
- Affiliations: Roman Catholic
- Location: Douai, France
- Language: English

The English College (French: College des Grands Anglais) was a Catholic seminary in Douai, France (also previously spelled Douay, and in English Doway), associated with the University of Douai. It was established in 1568, and was suppressed in 1793. It is known for a Bible translation referred to as the Douay–Rheims Bible. Of over 300 British priests who studied at the English College, about one-third were executed after returning home.

The dissolution of the college at the time of the French Revolution led to the founding of Crook Hall near Lanchester in County Durham (which became St Cuthbert's College), and St Edmund's College, Ware.

== History ==
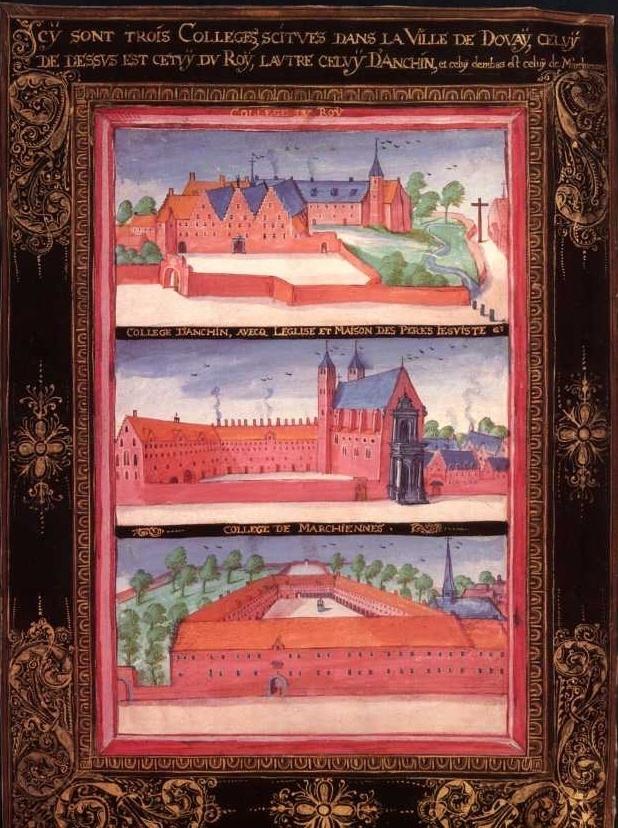
Colleges at University of Douai

=== University of Douai ===
As part of a general programme of consolidation of the Spanish Low Countries, in 1560–1562, Philip II of Spain established a university in Douai that was in some sense a sister-university to the Old University of Leuven founded in 1426. The University of Douai has emerged in recent studies as an important institution of its time. Of an avowedly Catholic character, it had five faculties: theology, canon and civil law, medicine, and arts. In the early years there was a strong English influence, with several of the chief posts being held by professors who had fled the University of Oxford after the accession of Protestants in England. It was there, too, that after taking his licentiate in 1560, William Allen from Lancashire became Regius Professor of Divinity.

=== An English college ===
The foundation of this university coincided with the presence of a large number of English Catholics living at Douai, in the wake of the accession of Elizabeth I and the restoration of Protestantism in England. These included the university's first chancellor, Richard Smith, who had studied at Oxford and thus had already brought the new university under Oxford influences.

It was William Allen who first had the idea for a seminary for English Catholic priests, with studies linked to those of the university. He had the idea in a conversation with Jean Vendeville, then Regius Professor of Canon Law in the University of Douai and later Bishop of Tournai (Allen and Vendeville went on a pilgrimage to Rome together in autumn 1567). The foundation began to take definite shape when Allen leased a house at Douai on Michaelmas Day 1568 with six initial students. Similar colleges also came about at Douai for Scottish and Irish Catholic clergy, and also Benedictine, Franciscan and Jesuit houses.

The aim of Allen and the college was to gather together some of the many English Catholics living in exile in different countries of the continent and provide them with facilities for continuing their studies (in what was effectively a Catholic University of Oxford in exile), thus producing a ready-made stock of educated English Catholic clergy ready for England's re-conversion to Catholicism (expected by Allen in the near future). At the same time the college was the first of the type of seminary ordered by the Council of Trent, and so received papal approval shortly after its establishment. It was also taken under the protection of King Philip II of Spain, who assigned it an annual grant of 200 ducats. Other seminaries or houses of study on the European continent for the training of priests from and for England and Wales (all known typically as English Colleges) included ones in Rome (from 1579), Valladolid (from 1589), Seville (from 1592) and Lisbon (from 1628).

Nevertheless, in the early years Allen's college had no regular income and was reliant on private donations from England and the generosity of a few local friends (especially the neighbouring monasteries of Saint-Vaast at Arras, Anchin, and Marchiennes, which, at the suggestion of Vendeville, had from time to time subscribed towards the work). Allen continued his own theological studies and, after taking his doctorate, became Regius Professor at the university, though he donated his whole salary to the college to keep it afloat. A few years after the foundation Allen applied to Pope Gregory XIII for regular funding. In 1565, Gregory granted the college a monthly pension of 100 golden crowns per month, which continued to be paid down to the time of the French Revolution.

Only a few years after foundation, Allen's personality and influence had attracted more than 150 students to the college. A steady stream of controversial works issued from Douai, some by Allen himself, others by such men as Thomas Stapleton and Richard Bristow. It was at the English College at Douai that the English translation of the Bible known as the Douay–Rheims Bible was completed in 1609. However, the college did see opposition from the university and town, with all the English at Douai expelled in 1578 and the college finding a temporary base at Rheims. The College did hold onto the house at Douai, however, and returned to it in 1593 (though without Allen, who had been called to reside in Rome, where he died on 16 October 1594).

=== Douai Martyrs ===
When the open re-conversion of England did not materialise (since the Marian Catholic bishops were dead, imprisoned or in exile, and the Catholic priests who had stayed in England were dying out or converting to Protestantism), the college began to supply missionary priests or "seminary priests" to enter England covertly, minister to existing Catholics and attempt re-conversion. Operating as a Catholic priest was legally high treason at the time (with the penalty of being hanged, drawn and quartered), and of the over 300 priests Douai sent into England by the end of the 16th century, more than 130 (mainly the secular clergy, known as the Douai Martyrs) are known to have been executed, with many more imprisoned and nearly 160 banished back to the continent. In 1577 Cuthbert Mayne became the first of them to be martyred. Back in Douai, the college was granted a special privilege of singing a solemn Mass of thanksgiving each time news reached them of another martyrdom of a Douai priest.

=== 17th and 18th centuries ===
Under Allen's successor, Richard Barrett, the work was extended to include a preparatory course in humanities, so that it became a school as well as a college. In 1603 under Thomas Worthington, the third president, a regular college was built, opposite the old parish church of St-Jacques, in the Rue des Morts, so called on account of the adjoining cemetery. The town at that time formed a single parish, whereas in the 18th century it was to be divided into four parishes, and the present church of St-Jacques dates from that time. Blessed Arthur Bell, the Franciscan, taught Hebrew at Douai in the 1620s.

Disputes occurred between the secular priests and regular priests in the 17th century similar to the disputes affecting English Catholic affairs in general. Worthington, though himself a secular priest, was under the influence of the Jesuit Father Persons, and for a long time the students attended the Jesuit schools and all the spiritual direction was in Jesuit hands. A visitation of the college, however, found many shortcomings in its administration and in the end Worthington was replaced as president by Matthew Kellison (1631–1641), who succeeded in restoring the reputation of the college and gradually arranged for instruction to be given once again by the college itself rather than the Jesuits.

In the latter half of the 17th century and the early years of the 18th century, the English College went through a troubled time. During the presidency of Dr Hyde (1646–1651), the University of Douai obtained certain controlling rights over the college, but Hyde successfully withstood these. His successor, George Leyburn (1652–1670), fell out with the body of secular priests in England known as the "Old Chapter", which in the absence of a bishop, was governing the Catholic Church in England. Leyburn attacked Thomas White, alias Blacklo, a prominent member of the "Old Chapter", and arranged a condemnation of his writings by the University of Douai. (In the meantime Douai had been captured by the French in 1677.) In the end, however, Leyburn himself found it necessary to retire in favour of his nephew, John Leyburn, who was afterwards Vicar Apostolic in England. Hardly was the dispute with the "Blackloists" finished, when a further storm of an even more serious nature arose, the centre being Edward Hawarden who was professor of philosophy and then of theology at the English College for seventeen years. His reputation became so great that when a vacancy occurred in 1702 he was solicited by the bishop, the chief members of the university, and the magistrates of the town to accept the post of Regius professor of divinity. His candidature, however, was opposed by a party headed by the vice-chancellor. The Jesuits also declared against him, accusing him, and through him the English College, of Jansenism. In the end, Hawarden retired from Douai and went on the mission in England; and a visitation of the college, made by order of the Holy See, resulted in completely clearing him of the accusation.

Douai became ever more important to English Catholics when their hopes of England returning to Catholicism were finally ended by the defeat of the Jacobite risings. Under the presidency of Robert Witham (1715–1738) the English College at Douai was rebuilt on a substantial scale and rescued from the overwhelming debt into which it had been plunged when it lost nearly all its endowment in the notorious "South Sea Bubble".

=== French Revolution ===
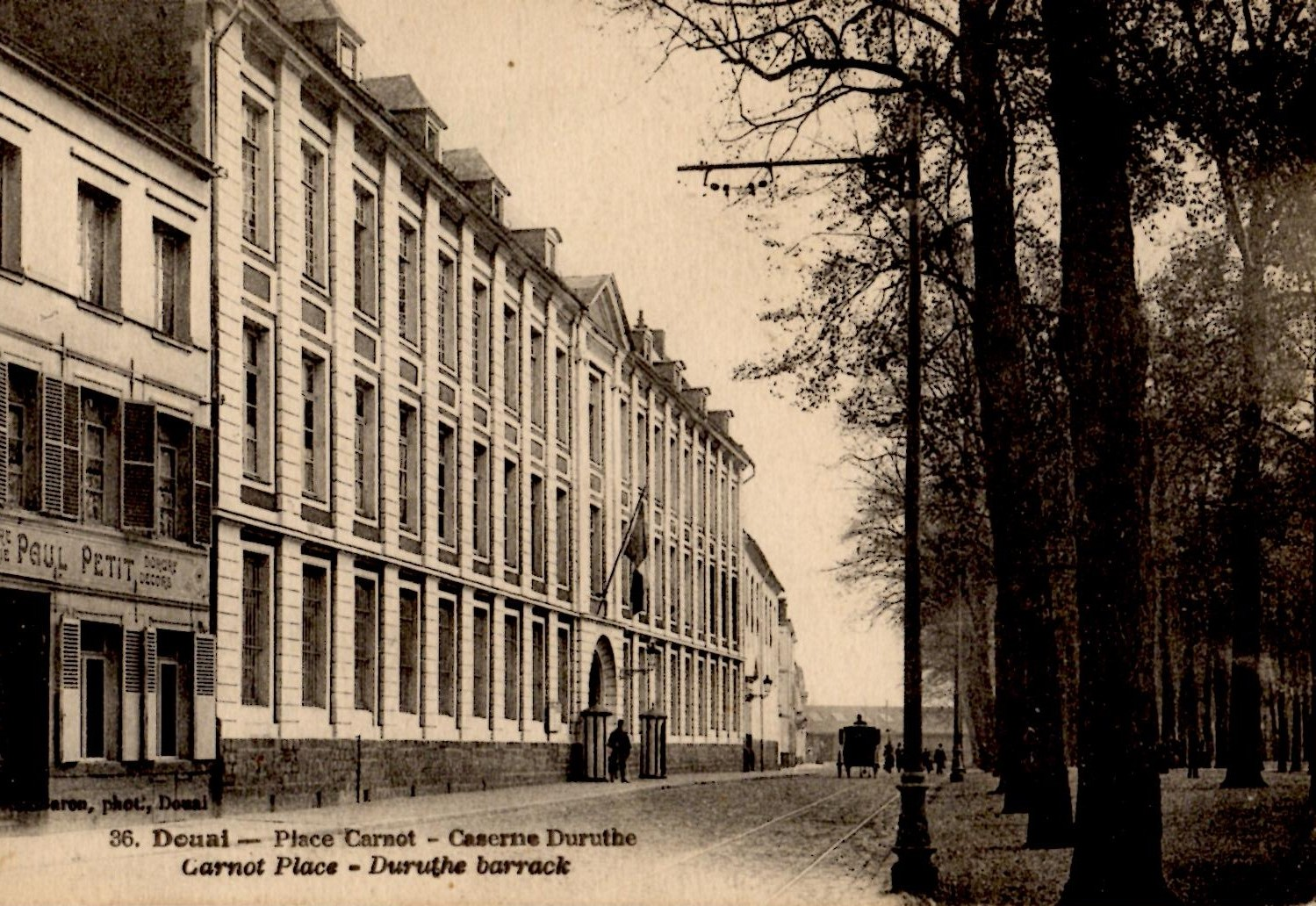
Postcard circa 1910 depicting the building that housed the English College at the time of its dissolution in 1793.

As a town Douai suffered less than many others at the beginning of the French Revolution and at first the university and its associated colleges held onto its Catholic character, but during the Reign of Terror it suffered the same fate as many similar establishments. When all the clergy of the town were called upon in 1791 to take the "Civic Oath", the members of the British establishments claimed exemption in virtue of their nationality. The plea was allowed for a time but, when Louis XVI was executed and Britain declared war, the superiors and students of most of the other British establishments realised their immunity was at an end and fled to England.

The members of the English College, with their president, John Daniel, remained in the hope of saving the college. However, in October, 1793, they were taken to prison at Doullens in Picardy, together with six Anglo-Benedictine monks who had remained for a similar purpose, and Thomas Stapleton (President of St Omer) and his students. After suffering in prison, the English Collegians were allowed to return to Douai in November 1794 and a few months later Stapleton managed to gain their release and permission to return to England, though the college would never return to Douai. In England, the Penal Laws had recently been repealed, and they founded two colleges to continue the college's work, at Crook Hall, County Durham (afterwards removed to Ushaw College, County Durham) in the North and St Edmund's College, Old Hall, at Ware, Hertfordshire in the South. The Roman pension was divided equally between these two until the French occupied Rome in 1799, when it ceased to be paid.

After the evacuation of the English students in 1793, the building that housed the college was converted to military barracks and named after Douai native and war hero Pierre François Joseph Durutte (1767–1827). It remained a military barracks until it was leveled in 1926. Subsequent excavation of the grounds revealed buried relics, including the body of John Southworth (1592–1654), an alumnus who had been martyred for his faith.

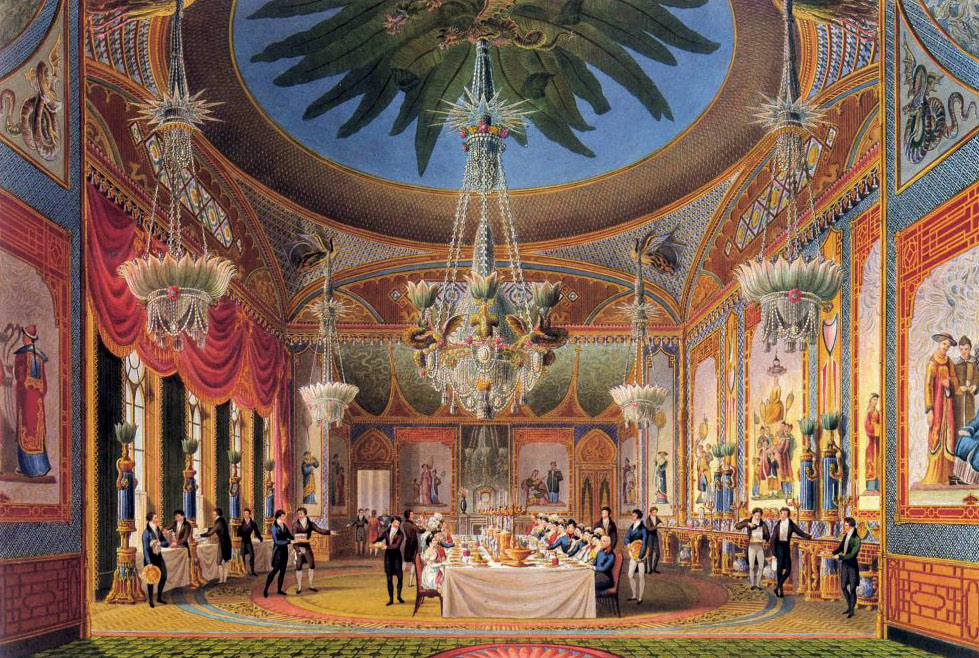
Brighton banqueting room

After the Revolution, Bonaparte united all the British establishments in France under one administrator, John Baptist Walsh, an Irishman, Rector of the Irish College in Paris. On the Bourbon Restoration, a large sum of money was paid to the British Government to indemnify those who had suffered by the Revolution, though none of this reached the Catholics. It was ruled that as the Catholic colleges were carried on in France for the sole reason that they were illegal in England, they must be considered French, not English, establishments, though the buildings were restored to their rightful owners. An old tradition, considered credible by antiquarian Joseph Gillow, holds that the funds were diverted to complete the furnishings of George IV's Royal Pavilion at Brighton.

With the laws of separation of Church and State implemented in 1905, all the property of the English Benedictines was confiscated by the French state. The community thus returned to England, reestablishing its monastery and school at Woolhampton in Berkshire, in proximity to London.

=== Present-day ===
The college's buildings now house the Institution Saint-Jean de Douai, a public-private school for children.

== See also ==
- List of presidents of the English College, Douai
- Category:English College, Douai alumni
- Irish College, Douai
- Scottish College, Douai
- English College, Valladolid
- William Reynolds (theologian)
- Douai Abbey

== Sources ==
Purdy, Albert B., The Ecclesiastical Review, The Recovery of the Body of the Venerable John Southworth, February, 1929, Vol. 10, No. 2.
