= William Allen (cardinal) =

English Cardinal of the Roman Catholic Church

His Eminence William Allen
- Cardinal, Prefect of the Vatican Library
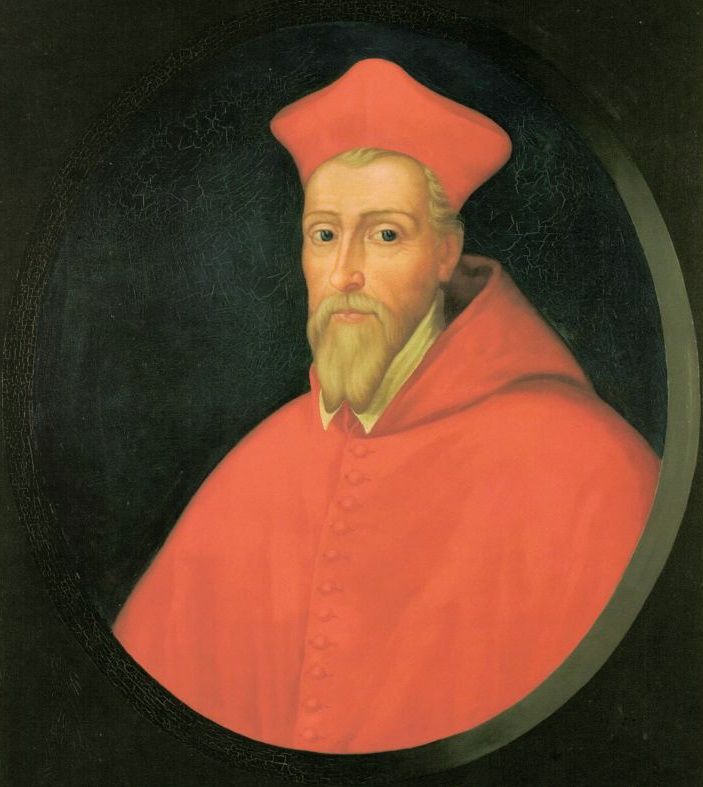
- Church: Catholic Church
- Other post: Cardinal-Priest of Santi Silvestro e Martino ai Monti (1587–1594)
- Previous post: Canon of York

Orders
- Ordination: 1565
- Created cardinal: 7 August 1587 by Pope Sixtus V
- Rank: Cardinal-priest

Personal details
- Born: 1532 Rossall (near present-day Fleetwood), Lancashire, England
- Died: 16 October 1594 (aged 62) Rome, Papal States
- Buried: Church of St Thomas of Canterbury at the English College, Rome
- Denomination: Roman Catholic
- Parents: John Allen (father); Jane Lister (mother)

William Allen (1532 – 16 October 1594), also known as Guilielmus Alanus or Gulielmus Alanus, was an English Cardinal of the Roman Catholic Church. He was an ordained priest, but was never a bishop. His main role was setting up colleges to train English missionary priests with the mission of returning secretly to England to keep Roman Catholicism alive there. Allen assisted in the planning of the Spanish Armada's attempted invasion of England in 1588. It failed badly, but if it had succeeded he would probably have been made Archbishop of Canterbury and Lord Chancellor. The Douai-Rheims Bible, a complete translation into English from Latin, was printed under Allen's orders. His activities were part of the Counter Reformation, but they led to an intense response in England and in Ireland. He advised and recommended Pope Pius V to pronounce Elizabeth I deposed. After the Pope declared her excommunicated and deposed, Elizabeth intensified the persecution of her Roman Catholic religious opponents.

== Early life ==
William Allen was born in 1532, at Rossall Hall in Rossall, Lancashire, England. He was the third son of John Allen by his marriage to Jane Lister. In 1547, at the age of fifteen, he entered Oriel College, Oxford, graduated Bachelor of Arts in 1550, and was elected a Fellow of his College. In 1554, he was promoted by seniority to Master of Arts, and two years later, in 1556, was made Principal and Proctor of Saint Mary's Hall.

Allen seems also to have been a canon at York Minster in or about 1558, indicating that he had most likely received tonsure, the initial step towards ordination that conferred clerical status. Upon the accession of Elizabeth I, he refused to take the Oath of Supremacy, but was allowed to remain at the University of Oxford until 1561.

His public opposition to the newly Protestantized Church of England forced him to leave the country, and in 1561, after resigning his benefices, he left England to seek refuge at Louvain and its University, where he joined many other academics from Oxford and Cambridge who had refused to take the Oath of Supremacy. There, he continued his theological studies and began to write apologetic, polemic, and controversialist treatises. In the following year, because of ill health, he was advised to return to his native Lancashire. He devoted himself to the re-conversion of his native land to the old faith. In particular, he worked to dissuade the Roman Catholic faithful from attending Anglican worship, an outward compromise of their faith and conscience that many made, to avoid ruin from fines, confiscations, and other disabilities.

During this period as a clandestine missionary in England, Allen formed the conviction that the people were not set against Rome by choice, but by force and by circumstances; and the majority were only too ready, in response to his sermons and ministrations, to return to Roman Catholicism. He was convinced that the Protestant hold over the Kingdom, favoured by the policies of Elizabeth, could only be temporary. When his presence was discovered by the Queen's agents, he fled from Lancashire and withdrew to Oxford, where he had many acquaintances.

After writing a treatise in defence of the power of the priest to remit sins, Allen was obliged to move to Norfolk, under the protection of the family of the Duke of Norfolk, but already in 1565 had once again to leave for the Continent. He was never to return. Travelling to the Low Countries, he was ordained as a priest shortly afterwards at Malines in Flanders and began to lecture in theology at the Benedictine College there.

== College at Douai ==
William Allen was always convinced that the Protestant wave over the country, due to the action of Elizabeth, could only be temporary and that the whole future depended on there being a supply of trained clergy and controversialists ready to come into the country whenever Catholicism should be restored. In 1567, Allen went to Rome for the first time and conceived his plans for establishing a College where students from England and Wales could live together and finish their theological education. The idea subsequently developed into the establishment of a missionary college, or seminary, to supply England with priests as long as the schism with the See of Rome persisted. With the help of friends, and notably of the Benedictine abbots of the neighbouring monasteries, a beginning was made in a rented house at Douai on Michaelmas Day, 29 September 1568, which marked the inauguration of the English College, Douai.

Allen was to be joined by many English exiles, including Edmund Campion. Douai was thought suitable for Allen's new College because of the recent foundation there of the University of Douai by Pope Paul IV, under the patronage of King Philip II of Spain, to whose dominions Douai then belonged, and because the foundation had the active encouragement of Jean Vendeville, a law professor at the university, who had accompanied Allen on his journey back from Rome. On 31 January 1570, through the influence of Vendeville, Allen was given the post of Professor of Sacred Scripture.

Allen's College became central to the "English mission" for the re-conversion of England. Amongst the "seminary priests", as they were called, over 160 former students from Douai are known to have been put to death under the Penal Laws; more were imprisoned. Students celebrated the news of each martyrdom, and, by special dispensation, said a solemn Mass of thanksgiving.

== Rome and Rheims ==
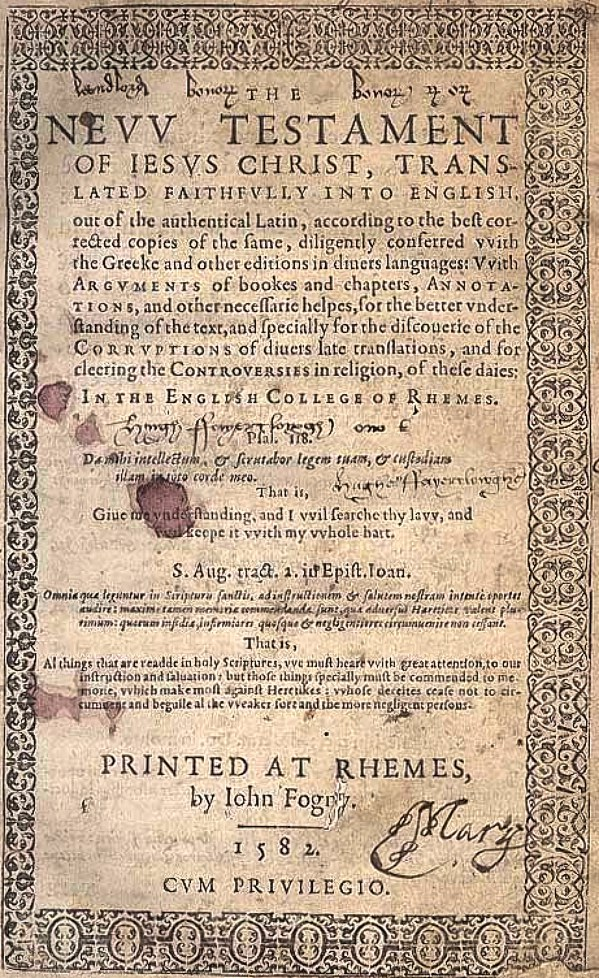
Title page from the 1582 Douai-Rheims New Testament, "specially for the discouerie of the CORRVPTIONS of diuers late translations, and for cleering the CONTROVERSIES in religion."

The number of students at the new college rose rapidly to one hundred and twenty, and the Pope summoned Allen to Rome to establish a similar college there. In 1575 Allen made a second journey to Rome, where by order of Pope Gregory XIII he assisted in the establishment of the English College at Rome. To that end, the ancient English Hospice in Rome was taken over and converted into a seminary for the sending of missionaries to England, and Jesuits were placed in the College to assist Maurice Clenock DD, Rector of the College.

The Pope appointed Allen to be a Canon in Courtray and he returned to Douai in July 1576, but there he had to face a new difficulty. Besides the plots to assassinate him by agents of the Queen of England, the rebels against the rule of the Spanish Crown, encouraged by Elizabeth and her emissaries, now present in Douai, expelled the students of the University from Douai in March 1578. Allen then re-established the College at Rheims, a city then under the patronage and protection of the House of Guise. The collegians took refuge at the University of Rheims, where they were well received, and continued their work as before, and Allen was soon afterwards elected a canon in the Chapter of Rheims Cathedral. Thomas Stapleton, Richard Bristow, Gregory Martin, and Morgan Phillips were amongst Allen's companions.

From the College press came a constant stream of polemic, controversialist, and other Roman Catholic literature, which for obvious reasons could not be printed in England. Allen took a prominent part in this. One of the chief works undertaken in the early years of the College was the preparation under Allen's direction of the well-known Douai Bible, a translation from Latin into English. The New Testament was published in 1582 when the College was at Rheims; but the Old Testament, although completed at the same time, was delayed, due to a lack of funds. It was eventually printed and published at Douai, in 1609, two years before the Authorized King James Version prepared on James's orders by the Church of England.

== Political activism ==
In 1577 Allen began a correspondence with the Jesuit priest Robert Parsons. Allen was again summoned to Rome in 1579 and was charged with suppressing an insurrection within the English College, caused by contrasts between students from Wales and the rest of the students from England. It was during this visit that he was appointed as one of the Commissioners charged with submitting proposals for the revision of the Latin Vulgate Bible. Brought into personal contact with Parsons, Allen was captivated by his personality and charisma, and Parsons became a trusted friend. Under Allen's orders, the English College at Rome was placed under the control of the Society of Jesus, as part of a plan to send Jesuit missionaries to England by 1580. Under Allen's instructions, the first Jesuits to be sent, Parsons and Edmund Campion, were to work closely in England with other Roman Catholic priests. The mission met with little success, as Campion was put to death only after a year's work, and Parsons again had to flee to mainland Europe.

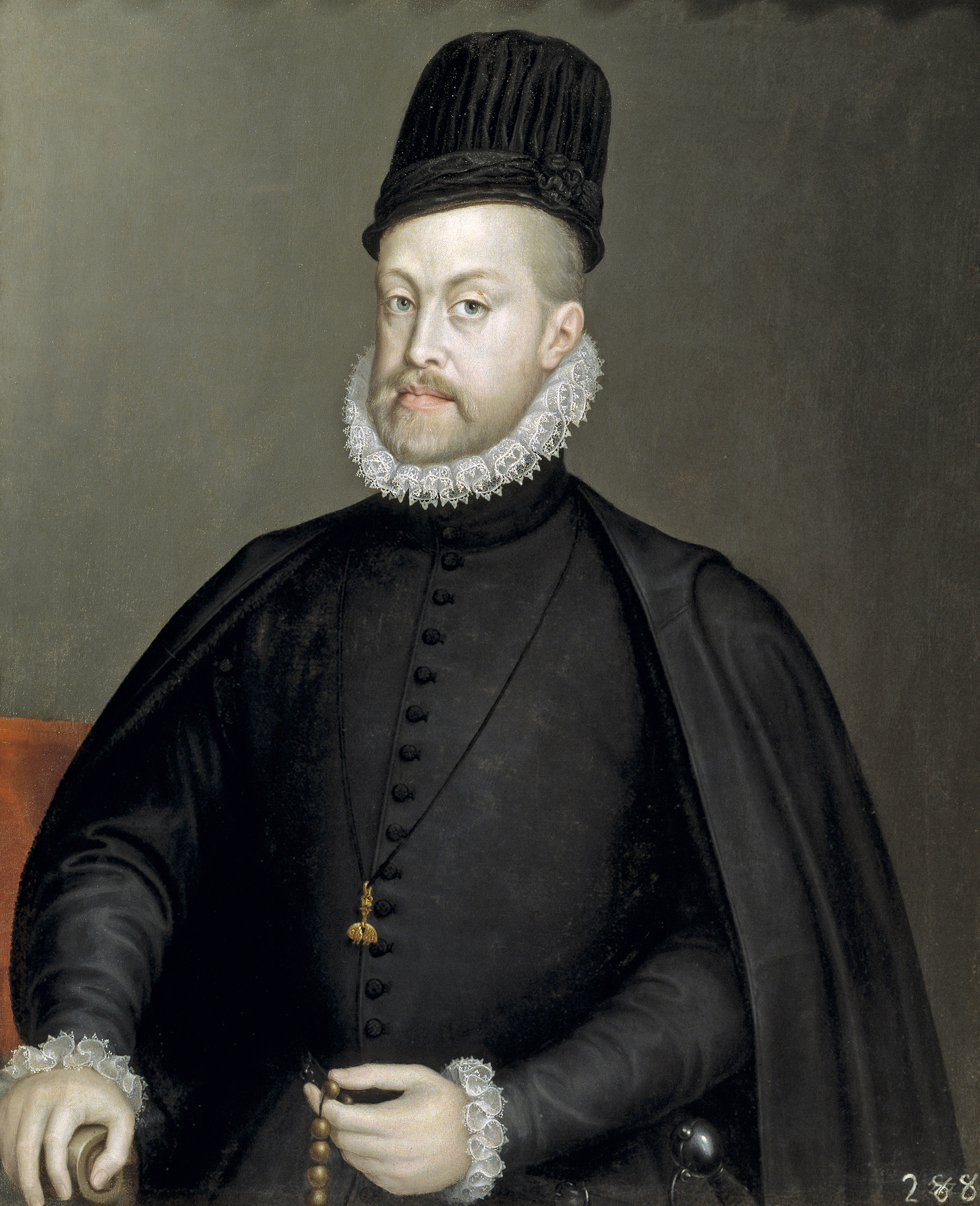
King Philip II of Spain recommended Allen to become a Cardinal with the Pope in 1587.

Allen himself saw his work as "scholastical attempts" to end the English schism from Rome. His efforts to secure this were completely unsuccessful, and arguably made matters worse for supporters of the Church of Rome in England, Wales, and Ireland. Pope Pius V, in his papal bull Regnans in Excelsis (1570), sentenced Elizabeth to both excommunication and "deposition" from the throne, and, upon the pain of excommunication, "released and forbade" her subjects from their allegiance to the Queen.

Returning to Rheims, Allen allowed himself to be drawn into the political intrigues of Parsons for the furtherance of Philip's interests in England and Ireland. Parsons had already resolved to remove Allen from the seminary at Rheims, and to that end, as far back as 6 April 1581, had recommended Allen to Philip II of Spain, with a view to the King's securing Allen's appointment as a cardinal. On 18 September 1581, Pope Gregory XIII named Allen "Prefect of the English Mission".

Allen and Parsons went to Rome again in 1585, and there Allen remained for the rest of his life. In 1587, whilst he was the subject of the intrigue by Philip's agents, he wrote, helped by Parsons, a book in defence of Sir William Stanley, an English officer who had surrendered the town of Deventer in Overijssel, part of the territory of the modern Kingdom of the Netherlands, to King Philip's armies. Allen wrote that all Englishmen were obliged, under the pain of eternal damnation, to follow that example, as Elizabeth I was "no lawful queen" in the eyes of God.

Allen helped in the planning of the attempted Spanish invasion of England, and would probably have been made Archbishop of Canterbury and Lord Chancellor if it had been successful. Allen was the head of the Roman Catholic Church in England under the Pope, and in this position, just after the death of Mary, Queen of Scots, he wrote to Philip II on 19 March 1587 to encourage him to undertake an invasion of England, stating that the Roman Catholics in England (and in Ireland) were clamouring for the King of Spain to come and punish "this woman, hated by God and man". He was made a Cardinal by Pope Sixtus V on 7 August 1587.

== Spanish Armada ==
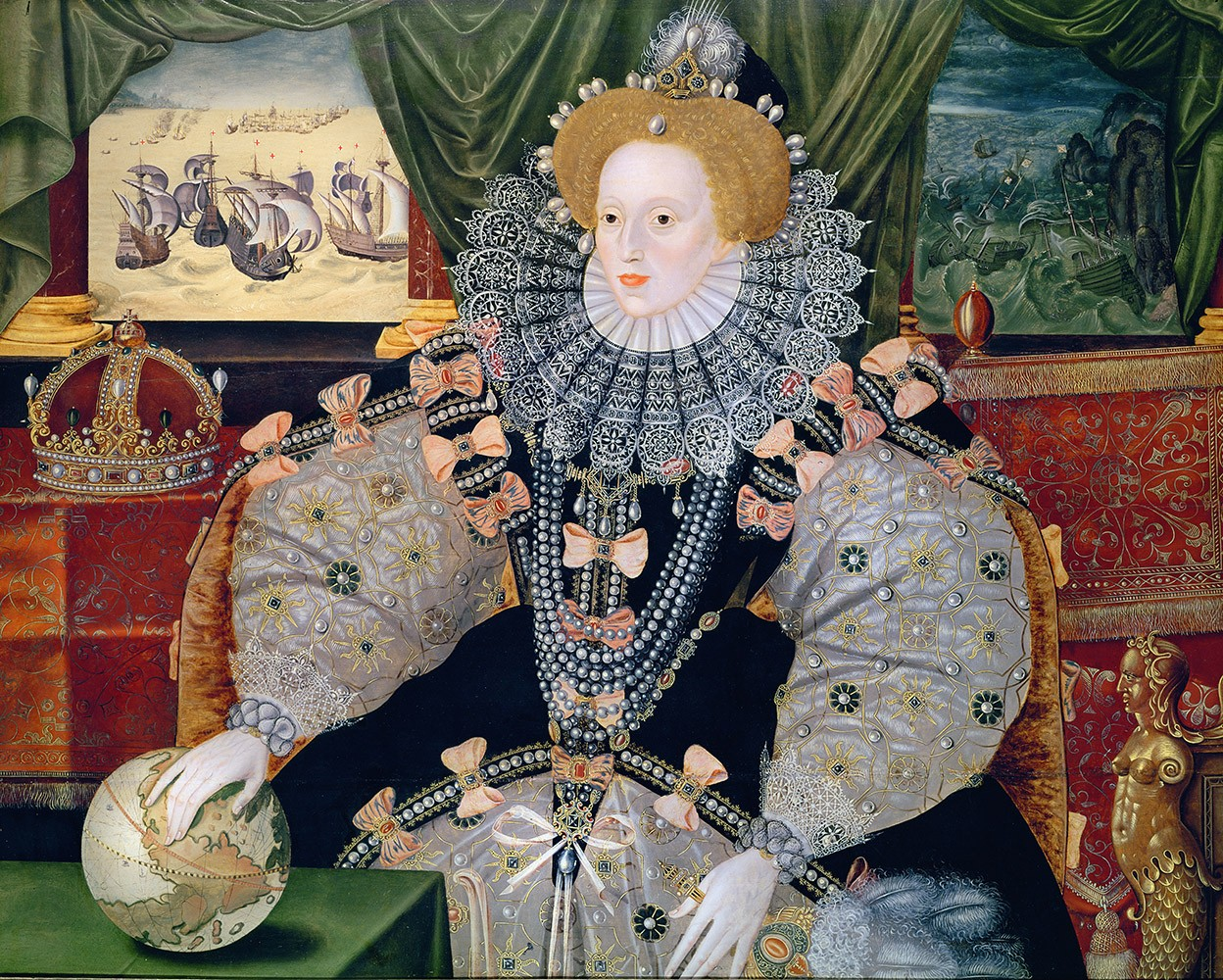
Portrait of Elizabeth I made to commemorate the defeat of the Spanish Armada, depicted in the background.

William Allen was then once more in Rome, having been summoned by the pope after a dangerous illness two years before. He never left the city of Rome again, but he kept in constant correspondence and communication with his countrymen back in England. It had been due to his influence that the Society of Jesus, to which he was greatly attached, undertook to join in the work of the English mission; and now Allen and Parsons became joint leaders of the "Spanish Party" amongst the Roman Catholics in England and in Ireland.

On the advice and recommendation of King Philip, Allen was created a Cardinal in 1587, and he was prepared to return to England immediately, should the invasion prove successful. However, both Allen and Parsons erred in estimating how much support they would find. The vast majority of the remaining Roman Catholic faithful in the Kingdom of England remained loyal to their own Queen against Spain and King Philip, and to them, the defeat of the Spanish Armada, in 1588, was an event that gave cause to rejoice.

Allen outlived the defeat of the Armada by some six years. To the end of his life, he reportedly remained fully convinced that the people of England and their Sovereign would soon become Roman Catholics once again. Upon his elevation, Allen wrote to the English College at Rheims that he owed his Cardinal's hat (also) to Parsons. One of his first acts was to order the publication, under his own name and authority, of two works for the purpose of inciting Roman Catholics in England to rise up against Elizabeth: The Declaration of the Sentence of Sixtus V, a broadside, and a book, An Admonition to the nobility and people of England (Antwerp, 1588). After the failure of the Armada, Philip, to rid himself of the financial burden of supporting Allen as Cardinal, nominated him to the Archbishopric of Malines. This, however, never received the Pope's confirmation.

== Last years ==
Pope Gregory XIV granted and bestowed on Allen the title of Prefect of the Vatican Library. In 1589, he assisted in the establishment of the English College at Valladolid in Spain. He took part in four Conclaves of the Church, although his influence diminished after the failure of the Armada. Before his death in Rome, he appeared to have changed his mind about the wisdom of Jesuit politics in Rome and in England. Certainly, his political activities could give grounds and cause for Elizabeth's government to regard the English seminaries on the Continent as hotbeds of treason.

Allen continued to reside at the English College, Rome, until his death. According to the Catholic Encyclopedia, as a Cardinal he had lived in poverty and died in debt at Rome on 16 October 1594. He was buried in the Chapel of the Holy Trinity adjoining the College.

== Legacy ==
William Allen's foundations at Douai survive today in two seminaries, one being the Venerable English College, Rome founded in 1579 by Allen and Pope Gregory XIII, which still bears the coat of arms of Allen as the college crest; the other being Allen Hall, Chelsea, in London, successor in spirit to Saint Edmund's College, Ware. Until 2011, when it closed, there also existed Saint Cuthbert's College, Ushaw, or Ushaw College, near Durham, in the north of England, where the College's coat-of-arms, granted by the Earl Marshal, who was also the Duke of Norfolk, incorporated the three hares or coneys from Allen's ancestral arms. The English College at Valladolid continues to prepare and educate Englishmen and Welshmen for the priesthood. Cardinal Allen Catholic High School in Fleetwood, Lancashire, near Allen's place of birth, is named in his honour. Until it closed about 1980, there was another secondary school named after Allen in Enfield, Middlesex, and a grammar school for boys in West Derby, Liverpool, carried his name until 1983 when it was renamed Cardinal Heenan Catholic High School.

== Works ==
A list of Allen's works is given in Joseph Gillow's Biographical Dictionary of the English Catholics. The following is a list of his printed publications:

- Certain Brief Reasons concerning the Catholick Faith (Douay, 1564)
- A Defense and Declaration of the Catholike Churches Doctrine touching Purgatory, and Prayers of the Soules Departed (Antwerp, 1565), re-edited in 1886
- A Treatise made in defence of the Lawful Power and Authoritie of the Preesthoode to remitte sinnes &c. (1578)
- De Sacramentis (Antwerp, 1565; Douay, 1603)
- An apologie and true declaration of the institution and endeavours of the two English colleges, the one in Rome, the other now resident in Rhemes against certaine sinister informations given up against the same (or An Apology for the English Seminaries, 1581)
- Apologia Martyrum (1583)
- Martyrium R. P. Edmundi Campiani, S. J. (1583)
- An Answer to the Libel of English Justice (Mons, 1584)
- The Copie of a Letter written by M. Doctor Allen concerning the Yeelding up of the Citie of Daventrie, unto his Catholike Majestie, by Sir William Stanley Knight (Antwerp, 1587), reprinted by the Chetham Society, 1851
- An Admonition to the Nobility and People of England and Ireland, concerning the present Warres made for the Execution of his Holines Sentence, by the highe and mightie Kinge Catholike of Spain, by the Cardinal of Englande (1588)
- A Declaration of the sentence and deposition of Elizabeth, the usurper and pretended Queene of England (1588; reprinted London, 1842).

== See also ==
- Richard Bristow
- William Reynolds (theologian)
- Thomas Worthington (Douai)

== Sources ==
Attribution:

Catholic Church titles
Preceded by Gabriele Paleotti	Cardinal Priest of Ss. Silvestro e Martino ai Monti; 1587–1594	Succeeded by Francesco Cornaro (iuniore)
