= Jehovah =

Vocalization of the divine name YHWH

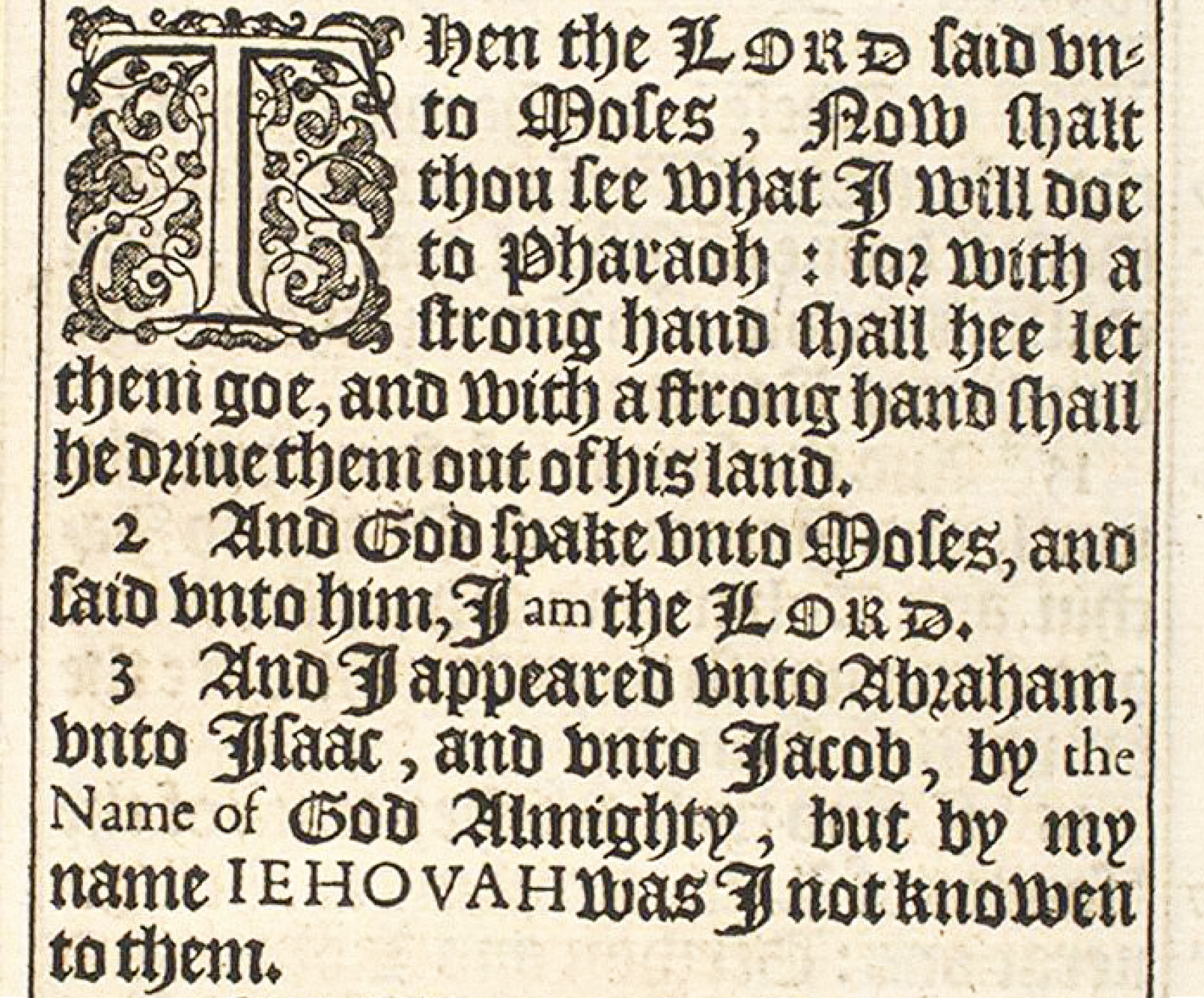
"Jehovah" at Exodus 6:3 (1611 King James Version)

Jehovah (/dʒɪˈhoʊvə/) is a Latinization of the Hebrew יְהֹוָה Yəhōwā, one vocalization of the Tetragrammaton יהוה (YHWH), the proper name of the God of Israel in the Hebrew Bible / Old Testament. The Tetragrammaton is considered one of the seven names of God in Judaism and a form of God's name in Christianity.

The consensus among scholars is that the historical vocalization of the Tetragrammaton at the time of the redaction of the Torah (6th century BCE) is most likely Yahweh. The historical vocalization was lost because in Second Temple Judaism, during the 3rd to 2nd centuries BCE, the pronunciation of the Tetragrammaton came to be avoided, being substituted with Adonai ('my Lord'). The Hebrew vowel points of Adonai were added to the Tetragrammaton by the Masoretes, and the resulting form was transliterated around the 12th century CE as Yehowah. The derived form Iehovah first appeared in the 16th century. The form Jehovah began to be printed following a 17th-century development leading J to become a separate letter for printing the consonantal I. (Note: These were previously considered graphical variants of the same letter.)

William Tyndale first introduced the vocalization Jehovah for the Tetragrammaton in his translation of Exodus 6:3, and it appears in some other early English translations including the Matthew Bible, the Great Bible, the Bishop's Bible, the Geneva Bible and the King James Version. The United States Conference of Catholic Bishops states that to pronounce the Tetragrammaton "it is necessary to introduce vowels that alter the written and spoken forms of the name (i.e. 'Yahweh' or 'Jehovah')." Jehovah appears in the Old Testament of some widely used translations including the American Standard Version (1901) and Young's Literal Translation (1862, 1899); the New World Translation (1961, 2013) uses Jehovah in both the Old and New Testaments. Jehovah does not appear in most mainstream English translations, some of which use Yahweh but most continue to use "Lord" or "LORD" to represent the Tetragrammaton.

== Pronunciation ==
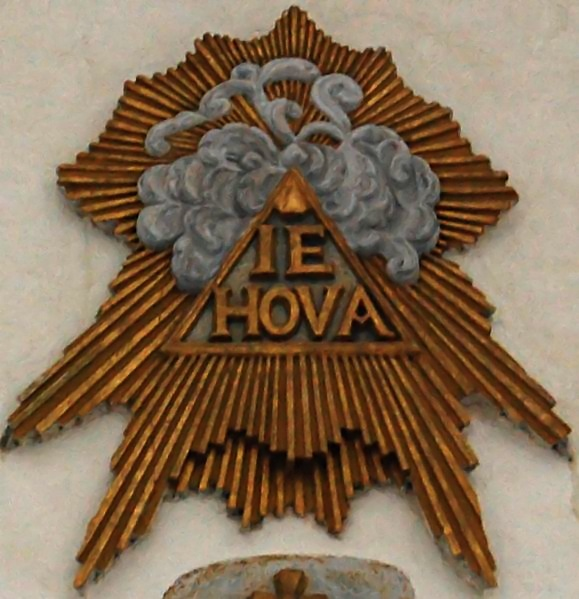
The name Iehova at a Lutheran church in Norway

Most scholars believe the name Jehovah (also transliterated as Yehowah) to be a hybrid form derived by combining the Hebrew letters יהוה (YHWH, later rendered in the Latin alphabet as JHVH) with the vowels of Adonai. Some hold that there is evidence that a form of the Tetragrammaton similar to Jehovah may have been in use in Semitic and Greek phonetic texts and artifacts from Late Antiquity. Others say that it is the pronunciation Yahweh that is testified in both Christian and pagan texts of the early Christian era.

Some Karaite Jews, as proponents of the rendering Jehovah, state that although the original pronunciation of יהוה has been obscured by disuse of the spoken name according to oral Rabbinic law, well-established English transliterations of other Hebrew personal names are accepted in normal usage, such as Joshua, Jeremiah, Isaiah or Jesus, for which the original pronunciations may be unknown. They also point out that "the English form Jehovah is an Anglicized form of Y^{e}hovah," and preserves the four Hebrew consonants "YHVH" (with the introduction of the "J" sound in English known as the voiced postalveolar affricate). Some argue that Jehovah is preferable to Yahweh, based on their conclusion that the Tetragrammaton was likely tri-syllabic originally, and that modern forms should therefore also have three syllables.

In an article he wrote in the Journal of Biblical Literature, Biblical scholar Francis B. Dennio said: "Jehovah misrepresents Yahweh no more than Jeremiah misrepresents Yirmeyahu. The settled connotations of Isaiah and Jeremiah forbid questioning their right." Dennio argued that the form Jehovah is not a barbarism, but is the best English form available, being that it has for centuries gathered the necessary connotations and associations for valid use in English.

According to a Jewish tradition developed during the 3rd to 2nd centuries BCE, the Tetragrammaton is written but not pronounced. When read, substitute terms replace the divine name where יְהֹוָה (Yəhōwā) appears in the text. It is widely assumed, as proposed by the 19th-century Hebrew scholar Wilhelm Gesenius, that the vowels of the substitutes of the name—Adonai (Lord) and Elohim (God)—were inserted by the Masoretes to indicate that these substitutes were to be used. (Note: "יְהֹוָה Jehovah, pr[oper] name of the supreme God amongst the Hebrews. The later Hebrews, for some centuries before the time of Christ, either misled by a false interpretation of certain laws (Ex. 20:7; Lev. 24:11), or else following some old superstition, regarded this name as so very holy, that it might not even be pronounced (see Philo, Vit. Mosis t.iii. p.519, 529). Whenever, therefore, this nomen tetragrammaton occurred in the sacred text, they were accustomed to substitute for it אֲדֹנָי, and thus the vowels of the noun אֲדֹנָי are in the Masoretic text placed under the four letters יהוה, but with this difference, that the initial Yod receives a simple and not a compound Sh'va (יְהֹוָה [Yəhōvā], not (יֲהֹוָה [Yăhōvā]); prefixes, however, receive the same points as if they were followed by אֲדֹנָי [...] This custom was already in vogue in the days of the LXX. translators; and thus it is that they everywhere translated יְהֹוָה by ὁ Κύριος (אֲדֹנָי).") When יהוה precedes or follows Adonai, the Masoretes placed the vowel points of Elohim into the Tetragrammaton, producing a different vocalization of the Tetragrammaton יֱהֹוִה (Yĕhōvī), which was read as Elohim. Based on this reasoning, the form יְהֹוָה (Jehovah) has been characterized by some as a "hybrid form", and even "a philological impossibility".

Early modern translators disregarded the practice of reading Adonai (or its equivalents in Greek and Latin, Κύριος and Dominus) (Note: The Latin Vulgate of St. Jerome renders the name as Adonai at Exodus 6:3 rather than as Dominus.) in place of the Tetragrammaton and instead combined the four Hebrew letters of the Tetragrammaton with the vowel points that, except in synagogue scrolls, accompanied them, resulting in the form Jehovah. This form, which first took effect in works dated 1278 and 1303, was adopted in Tyndale's and some other Protestant translations of the Bible. In the 1560 Geneva Bible, the Tetragrammaton is translated as Jehovah six times, four as the proper name, and two as place-names. In the 1611 King James Version, Jehovah occurred seven times. In the 1885 English Revised Version, the form Jehovah occurs twelve times. In the 1901 American Standard Version the form "Je-ho'vah" became the regular English rendering of the Hebrew יהוה, all throughout, in preference to the previously dominant "the LORD", which is generally used in the King James Version. (Note: According to the preface, this was because the translators felt that the "Jewish superstition, which regarded the Divine Name as too sacred to be uttered, ought no longer to dominate in the English or any other version of the Old Testament".) It is also used in Christian hymns such as the 1771 hymn, "Guide Me, O Thou Great Jehovah".

=== Development ===
The most widespread theory is that the Hebrew term יְהֹוָה has the vowel points of אֲדֹנָי (adonai). Using the vowels of adonai, the composite hataf patah ( ֲ ) under the guttural alef (א) becomes a sheva ( ְ ) under the yod (י), the holam ( ֹ ) is placed over the first he (ה), and the qamats ( ָ ) is placed under the vav (ו), giving יְהֹוָה (Jehovah). When the two names, יהוה and אדני, occur together, the former is pointed with a hataf segol ( ֱ ) under the yod (י) and a hiriq ( ִ ) under the second he (ה), giving יֱהֹוִה, to indicate that it is to be read as elohim in order to avoid adonai being repeated.

Taking the spellings at face value may have been as a result of not knowing about the Q're perpetuum, resulting in the transliteration Yehowah and derived variants. Emil G. Hirsch was among the modern scholars that recognized "Jehovah" to be "grammatically impossible". Scholar Marvin Pope describes the spelling "Jehovah" as "a morphological monstrosity with no claim to legitimacy except the several centuries of misguided usage."

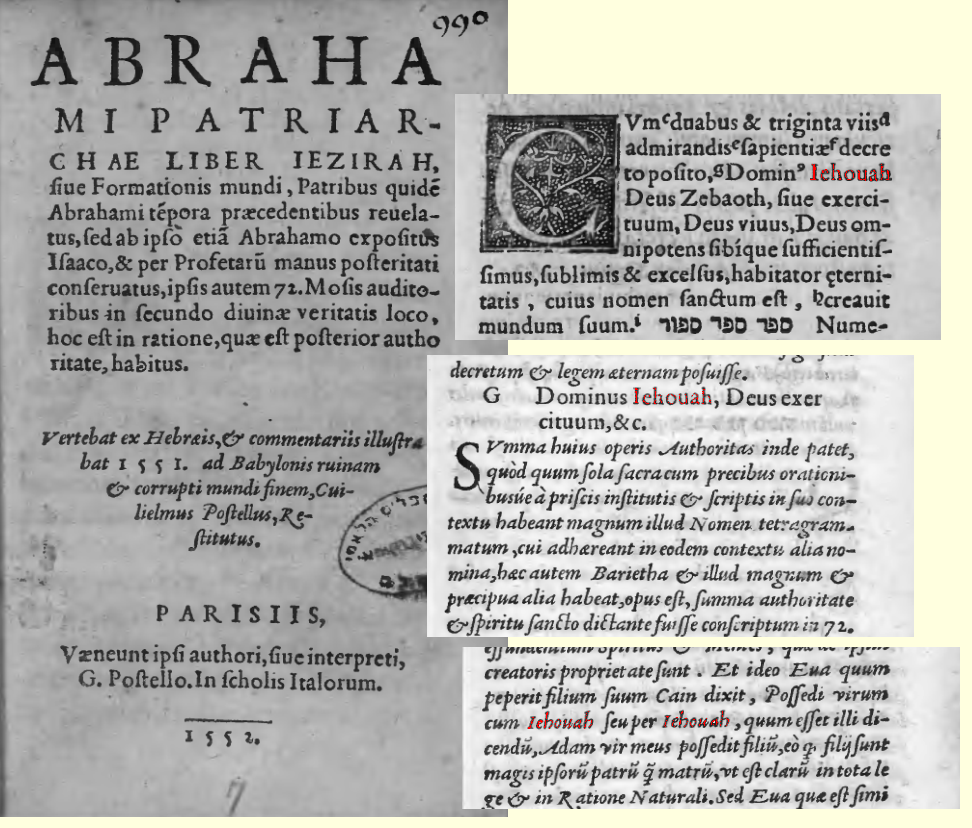
A 1552 Latin translation of the Sefer Yetzirah, using the form Iehouah for the "magnum Nomen tetragrammatum"

יְהֹוָה appears 6,518 times in the traditional Masoretic Text, in addition to 305 instances of יֱהֹוִה (Jehovih). The pronunciation Jehovah is believed to have arisen through the introduction of vowels of the qere—the marginal notation used by the Masoretes. In places where the consonants of the text to be read (the qere) differed from the consonants of the written text (the kethib), they wrote the qere in the margin to indicate that the kethib was read using the vowels of the qere. For a few very frequent words the marginal note was omitted, referred to as q're perpetuum. One of these frequent cases was God's name, which was not to be pronounced in fear of profaning the "ineffable name". Instead, wherever יהוה (YHWH) appears in the kethib of the biblical and liturgical books, it was to be read as אֲדֹנָי (adonai, "My Lord [plural of majesty]"), or as אֱלֹהִים (elohim, "God") if adonai appears next to it. This combination produces יְהֹוָה (yehova) and יֱהֹוִה (yehovi) respectively. יהוה is also written ה', or even ד', and read ha-Shem ("the name").

Scholars are not in total agreement as to why יְהֹוָה does not have precisely the same vowel points as adonai. The use of the composite hataf segol ( ֱ ) in cases where the name is to be read elohim, has led to the opinion that the composite hataf patah ( ֲ ) ought to have been used to indicate the reading adonai. It has been argued conversely that the disuse of the patah is consistent with the Babylonian system, in which the composite is uncommon.

==== Vowel points of יְהֹוָה and אֲדֹנָי ====
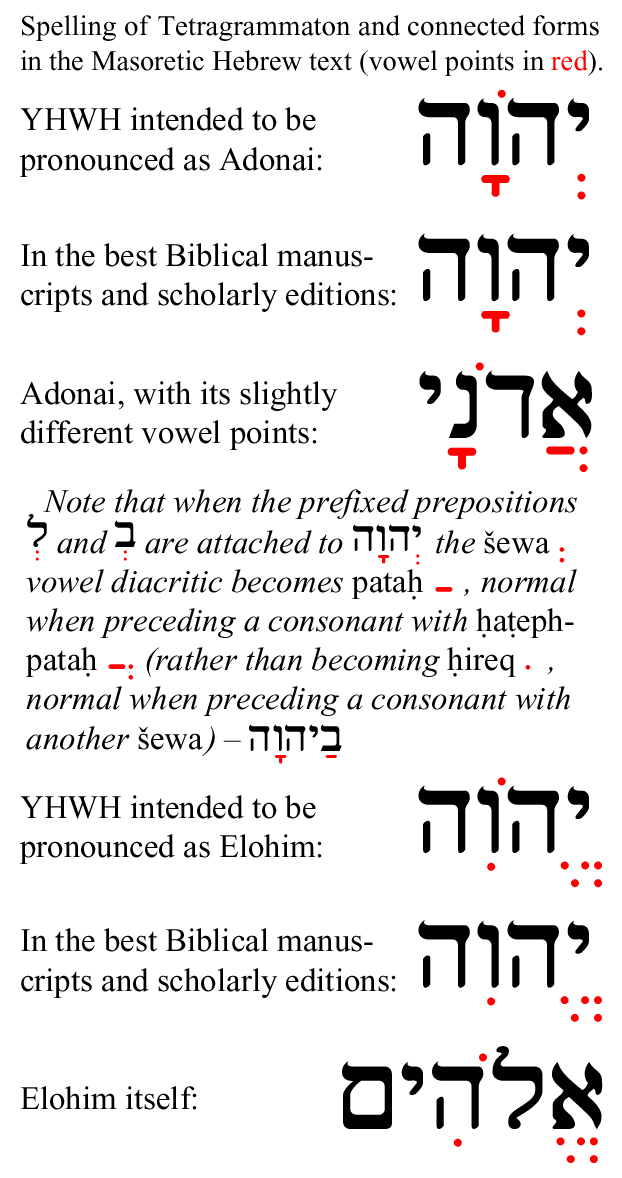
The spelling of the Tetragrammaton and connected forms in the Hebrew Masoretic text of the Bible, with vowel points shown in red

The table below shows the vowel points of Yehovah and Adonai, indicating the simple sheva in Yehovah in contrast to the hataf patah in Adonai. As indicated to the right, the vowel points used when the Tetragrammaton is intended to be pronounced as Adonai are slightly different to those used in Adonai itself.

Hebrew (Strong's #3068); YEHOVAH; יְהֹוָה			Hebrew (Strong's #136); ADONAY; אֲדֹנָי		
י	Yod	Y	א	Aleph	glottal stop
ְ	Simple sheva	E	ֲ	Hataf patah	A
ה	He	H	ד	Dalet	D
ֹ	Holam	O	ֹ	Holam	O
ו	Vav	V	נ	Nun	N
ָ	Qamats	A	ָ	Qamats	A
ה	He	H	י	Yod	Y

The difference between the vowel points of 'ǎdônây and YHWH is explained by the rules of Hebrew morphology and phonetics. Sheva and hataf-patah were allophones of the same phoneme used in different situations: hataf-patah on glottal consonants including aleph (such as the first letter in Adonai), and simple sheva on other consonants (such as the Y in YHWH).

=== Introduction into English ===
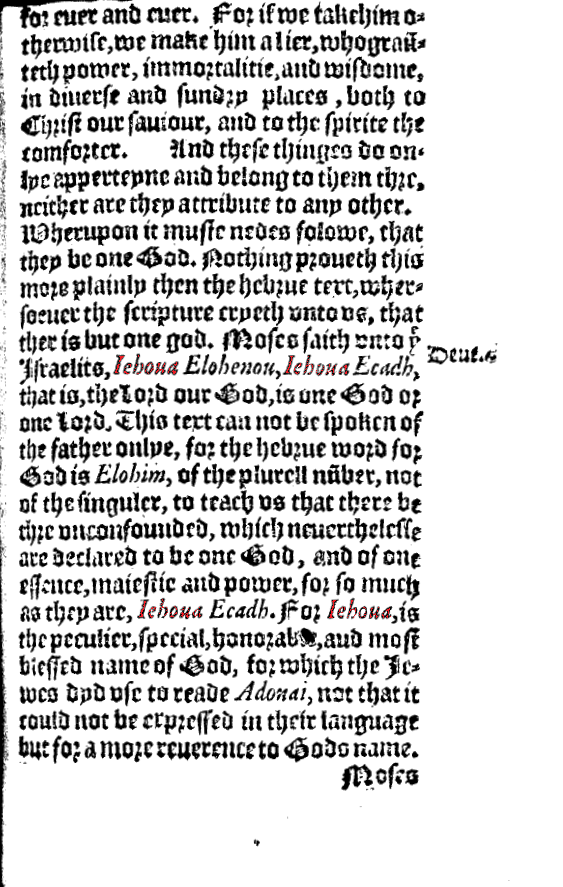
The "peculiar, special, honorable and most blessed name of God" Iehoua, an older English form of Jehovah (Roger Hutchinson, The image of God, 1550)

The earliest available Latin text to use a vocalization similar to Jehovah dates from the 13th century. The Brown-Driver-Briggs Lexicon suggested that the pronunciation Jehovah was unknown until 1520 when it was introduced by Galatinus, who defended its use.

In English it appeared in William Tyndale's translation of the Pentateuch ("The Five Books of Moses") published in 1530 in Germany, where Tyndale had studied since 1524, possibly in one or more of the universities at Wittenberg, Worms and Marburg, where Hebrew was taught. The spelling used by Tyndale was "Iehouah"; at that time, "I" was not distinguished from J, and U was not distinguished from V. The original 1611 printing of the King James Version used "IEHOVA". Tyndale wrote about the divine name: "IEHOUAH [Jehovah], is God's name; neither is any creature so called; and it is as much to say as, One that is of himself, and dependeth of nothing. Moreover, as oft as thou seest LORD in great letters (except there be any error in the printing), it is in Hebrew Iehouah, Thou that art; or, He that is." The name is also found in a 1651 edition of Ramón Martí's Pugio fidei.

The name Jehovah (initially as Iehouah) appeared in all early Protestant Bibles in English, except Coverdale's translation in 1535. The Roman Catholic Douay–Rheims Bible used "the Lord", corresponding to the Latin Vulgate's use of Dominus (Latin for Adonai, "Lord") to represent the Tetragrammaton. The King James Version, which used "Jehovah" in a few places, most frequently gave "the LORD" as the equivalent of the Tetragrammaton. The form Iehouah appeared in John Rogers' Matthew Bible in 1537, the Great Bible of 1539, the Geneva Bible of 1560, Bishop's Bible of 1568 and the King James Version of 1611. More recently, Jehovah has been used in the Revised Version of 1885, the American Standard Version in 1901, and the New World Translation of the Holy Scriptures of Jehovah's Witnesses in 1961.

At Exodus 6:3–6, where the King James Version has Jehovah, the Revised Standard Version (1952), the New American Standard Bible (1971), the New International Version (1978), the New King James Version (1982), the New Revised Standard Version (1989), the New Century Version (1991), and the Contemporary English Version (1995) give "LORD" or "Lord" as their rendering of the Tetragrammaton, while the Jerusalem Bible, (1966), New Jerusalem Bible (1985), the Amplified Bible (1987), the New Living Translation (1996, revised 2007), and the Holman Christian Standard Bible (2004), the Legacy Standard Bible, (2021), and the Lexham English Bible, (2011) use the form Yahweh.

== Hebrew vowel points ==
Modern guides to Biblical Hebrew grammar, such as Duane A. Garrett's A Modern Grammar for Classical Hebrew state that the Hebrew vowel points now found in printed Hebrew Bibles were invented in the second half of the first millennium AD, long after the texts were written. This is indicated in the authoritative Hebrew Grammar of Gesenius, and Godwin's Cabalistic Encyclopedia, and is acknowledged even by those who say that guides to Hebrew are perpetuating "scholarly myths".

"Jehovist" scholars, largely earlier than the 20th century, who believe /dʒəˈhoʊvə/ to be the original pronunciation of the divine name, argue that the Hebraic vowel-points and accents were known to writers of the scriptures in antiquity and that both Scripture and history argue in favor of their ab origine status to the Hebrew language. Some members of Karaite Judaism, such as Nehemia Gordon, hold this view. The antiquity of the vowel points and of the rendering Jehovah was defended by various scholars, including Michaelis, Drach, Stier, William Fulke (1583), Johannes Buxtorf, his son Johannes Buxtorf II, and John Owen (17th century); Peter Whitfield and John Gill (18th century), John Moncrieff (19th century), Johann Friedrich von Meyer (1832) Thomas D. Ross has given an account of the controversy on this matter in England down to 1833. G. A. Riplinger, John Hinton, Thomas M. Strouse, and A. Cairns are more recent defenders of the authenticity of the vowel points.

=== Proponents of pre-Christian origin ===
18th-century theologian John Gill puts forward the arguments of 17th-century Johannes Buxtorf II and others in his writing, A Dissertation Concerning the Antiquity of the Hebrew Language, Letters, Vowel-Points and Accents. He argued for an extreme antiquity of their use, rejecting the idea that the vowel points were invented by the Masoretes. Gill presented writings, including passages of scripture, that he interpreted as supportive of his "Jehovist" viewpoint that the Old Testament must have included vowel-points and accents. He claimed that the use of Hebrew vowel points of יְהֹוָה, and therefore of the name Jehovah /jəˈhoʊvə/, is documented from before 200 BCE, and even back to Adam, citing Jewish tradition that Hebrew was the first language. He argued that throughout this history the Masoretes did not invent the vowel points and accents, but that they were delivered to Moses by God at Sinai, citing Karaite authorities Mordechai ben Nisan Kukizov (1699) and his associates, who stated that "all our wise men with one mouth affirm and profess that the whole law was pointed and accented, as it came out of the hands of Moses, the man of God." The argument between Karaite and Rabbinic Judaism on whether it was lawful to pronounce the name represented by the Tetragrammaton is claimed to show that some copies have always been pointed (voweled) and that some copies were not pointed with the vowels because of "oral law", for control of interpretation by some Judeo sects, including non-pointed copies in synagogues. Gill claimed that the pronunciation /jəˈhoʊvə/ can be traced back to early historical sources which indicate that vowel points and/or accents were used in their time. Sources Gill claimed supported his view include:

- The Book of Cosri and commentator Rabbi Judab Muscatus, which claim that the vowel points were taught to Adam by God.
- Saadiah Gaon (927 CE)
- Jerome (380 CE)
- Origen (250 CE)
- The Zohar (120 CE)
- Jesus Christ (31 CE), based on Gill's interpretation of Matthew 5:18
- Hillel the Elder and Shammai division (30 BCE)
- Karaites (120 BCE)
- Demetrius Phalereus, librarian for Ptolemy II Philadelphus king of Egypt (277 BCE)

Gill quoted Elia Levita, who said, "There is no syllable without a point, and there is no word without an accent," as showing that the vowel points and the accents found in printed Hebrew Bibles have a dependence on each other, and so Gill attributed the same antiquity to the accents as to the vowel points. Gill acknowledged that Levita, "first asserted the vowel points were invented by "the men of Tiberias", but made reference to his condition that "if anyone could convince him that his opinion was contrary to the book of Zohar, he should be content to have it rejected." Gill then alludes to the book of Zohar, stating that rabbis declared it older than the Masoretes, and that it attests to the vowel-points and accents.

William Fulke, John Gill, John Owen, and others held that Jesus Christ referred to a Hebrew vowel point or accent at Matthew 5:18, indicated in the King James Version by the word tittle.

The 1602 Spanish Bible (Reina-Valera/Cipriano de Valera) used the name Iehova and gave a lengthy defense of the pronunciation Jehovah in its preface.

=== Proponents of later origin ===
Despite Jehovist claims that vowel signs are necessary for reading and understanding Hebrew, modern Hebrew (apart from young children's books, some formal poetry and Hebrew primers for new immigrants), is written without vowel points. The Torah scrolls do not include vowel points, and ancient Hebrew was written without vowel signs.

The Dead Sea Scrolls, discovered in 1946 and dated from 400 BCE to 70 CE, include texts from the Torah or Pentateuch and from other parts of the Hebrew Bible, and have provided documentary evidence that, in spite of claims to the contrary, the original Hebrew texts were written without vowel points. Menahem Mansoor's The Dead Sea Scrolls: A College Textbook and a Study Guide claims the vowel points found in printed Hebrew Bibles were devised in the 9th and 10th centuries.

Gill's view that the Hebrew vowel points were in use at the time of Ezra or even since the origin of the Hebrew language is stated in an early 19th-century study in opposition to "the opinion of most learned men in modern times", according to whom the vowel points had been "invented since the time of Christ". The study presented the following considerations:

- The argument that vowel points are necessary for learning to read Hebrew is refuted by the fact that the Samaritan text of the Bible is read without them and that several other Semitic languages, kindred to Hebrew, are written without any indications of the vowels.
- The books used in synagogue worship have always been without vowel points, which, unlike the letters, have thus never been treated as sacred.
- The Qere Kethib marginal notes give variant readings only of the letters, never of the points, an indication either that these were added later or that, if they already existed, they were seen as not so important.
- The Kabbalists drew their mysteries only from the letters and completely disregarded the points, if there were any.
- In several cases, ancient translations from the Hebrew Bible (Septuagint, Targum, Aquila of Sinope, Symmachus, Theodotion, Jerome) read the letters with vowels different from those indicated by the points, an indication that the texts from which they were translating were without points. The same holds for Origen's transliteration of the Hebrew text into Greek letters. Jerome expressly speaks of a word in Habakkuk 3:5, which in the present Masoretic Text has three consonant letters and two vowel points, as being of three letters and no vowel whatever.
- Neither the Jerusalem Talmud nor the Babylonian Talmud (in all their recounting of Rabbinical disputes about the meaning of words), nor Philo nor Josephus, nor any Christian writer for several centuries after Christ make any reference to vowel points.

== Early modern arguments ==
In the 16th and 17th centuries, various arguments were presented for and against the transcription of the form Jehovah.

=== Discourses rejecting Jehovah ===
Author	Discourse	Comments
John Drusius (Johannes van den Driesche) (1550–1616)	Tetragrammaton, sive de Nomine Die proprio, quod Tetragrammaton vocant (1604)	Drusius stated "Galatinus first led us to this mistake [...] I know [of] nobody who read [it] thus earlier"). An editor of Drusius in 1698, however, knows of an earlier reading in Porchetus de Salvaticis. John Drusius wrote that neither יְהֹוָה nor יֱהֹוִה accurately represented God's name.
Sixtinus Amama (1593–1659)	De nomine tetragrammato (1628)	Sixtinus Amama was a Professor of Hebrew in the University of Franeker and a pupil of Drusius.
Louis Cappel (1585–1658)	De nomine tetragrammato (1624)	Lewis Cappel reached the conclusion that Hebrew vowel points were not part of the original Hebrew language. This view was strongly contested by John Buxtorff the elder and his son.
James Altingius (1618–1679)	Exercitatio grammatica de punctis ac pronunciatione tetragrammati (Grammatical exercise on the dots and pronunciation of the Tetragrammaton)	James Altingius was a German preacher, teacher and writer, who specialised in Oriental Languages such as Hebrew.

=== Discourses defending Jehovah ===
Author	Discourse	Comments
Nicholas Fuller (1557–1626)	Dissertatio de nomine יהוה (before 1626)	Nicholas was a Hebraist and a theologian.
John Buxtorf (1564–1629)	Disserto de nomine JHVH (1620); Tiberias, sive Commentarius Masoreticus (1664)	John Buxtorf the elder opposed the views of Elia Levita regarding the late origin (invention by the Masoretes) of the Hebrew vowel points, a subject which gave rise to the controversy between Louis Cappel and his (e.g. John Buxtorf the elder's) son, Johannes Buxtorf II the younger.
Johannes Buxtorf II (1599–1664)	Tractatus de punctorum origine, antiquitate, et authoritate, oppositus Arcano puntationis revelato Ludovici Cappelli (1648)	Continued his father's arguments that the pronunciation and therefore the Hebrew vowel points resulting in the name Jehovah have divine inspiration.
Thomas Gataker (1574–1654)	De Nomine Tetragrammato Dissertaio (1645)	See Memoirs of the Puritans.
John Leusden (1624–1699)	Dissertationes tres, de vera lectione nominis Jehova	John Leusden wrote three discourses in defense of the name Jehovah.

=== Summary of discourses ===
William Robertson Smith summarizes these discourses, concluding that "whatever, therefore, be the true pronunciation of the word, there can be little doubt that it is not Jehovah". (Note: Smith commented, "In the decade of dissertations collected by Reland, Fuller, Gataker, and Leusden do battle for the pronunciation Jehovah, against such formidable antagonists as Drusius, Amama, Cappellus, Buxtorf, and Altingius, who, it is scarcely necessary to say, fairly beat their opponents out of the field; "the only argument of any weight, which is employed by the advocates of the pronunciation of the word as it is written being that derived from the form in which it appears in proper names, such as Jehoshaphat, Jehoram, &c. [...] Their antagonists make a strong point of the fact that, as has been noticed above, two different sets of vowel points are applied to the same consonants under certain circumstances. To this Leusden, of all the champions on his side, but feebly replies. [...] The same may be said of the argument derived from the fact that the letters מוכלב, when prefixed to יהוה, take, not the vowels which they would regularly receive were the present pronunciation true, but those with which they would be written if אֲדֹנָי, adonai, were the reading; and that the letters ordinarily taking dagesh lene when following יהוה would, according to the rules of the Hebrew points, be written without dagesh, whereas it is uniformly inserted.") Despite this, he consistently uses the name Jehovah throughout his dictionary and when translating Hebrew names. Some examples include Isaiah [Jehovah's help or salvation], Jehoshua [Jehovah a helper], Jehu [Jehovah is He]. In the entry, Jehovah, Smith writes: "JEHOVAH (יְהֹוָה, usually with the vowel points of אֲדֹנָי; but when the two occur together, the former is pointed יֱהֹוִה, that is with the vowels of אֱלֹהִים, as in Obad. i. 1, Hab. iii. 19:" This practice is also observed in many modern publications, such as the New Compact Bible Dictionary (Special Crusade Edition) of 1967 and Peloubet's Bible Dictionary of 1947.

== Usage in English Bible translations ==
The following versions of the Bible render the Tetragrammaton as Jehovah either exclusively or in selected verses:

- William Tyndale, in his 1530 translation of the first five books of the English Bible, at Exodus 6:3 renders the divine name as Iehovah. In his foreword to this edition he wrote: "Iehovah is God's name... Moreover, as oft as thou seeist LORD in great letters (except there be any error in the printing) it is in Hebrew Iehovah."
- The Great Bible (1539) renders Jehovah in Psalm 33:12 and Psalm 83:18.
- The Geneva Bible (1560) translates the Tetragrammaton as Jehovah in Exodus 6:3, Psalm 83:18, and two other times as place-names, Genesis 22:14 and Exodus 17:15.
- In the Bishop's Bible (1568), the word Jehovah occurs in Exodus 6:3 and Psalm 83:18.
- The King James Version (1611) renders Jehovah in Exodus 6:3, Psalm 83:18, Isaiah 12:2 (see image), Isaiah 26:4, and three times in compound place names at Genesis 22:14, Exodus 17:15 and Judges 6:24.
- Webster's Bible Translation (1833) by Noah Webster, a revision of the King James Bible, contains the form Jehovah in all cases where it appears in the original King James Version, as well as another seven times in Isaiah 51:21, Jeremiah 16:21; 23:6; 32:18; 33:16, Amos 5:8 and Micah 4:13.

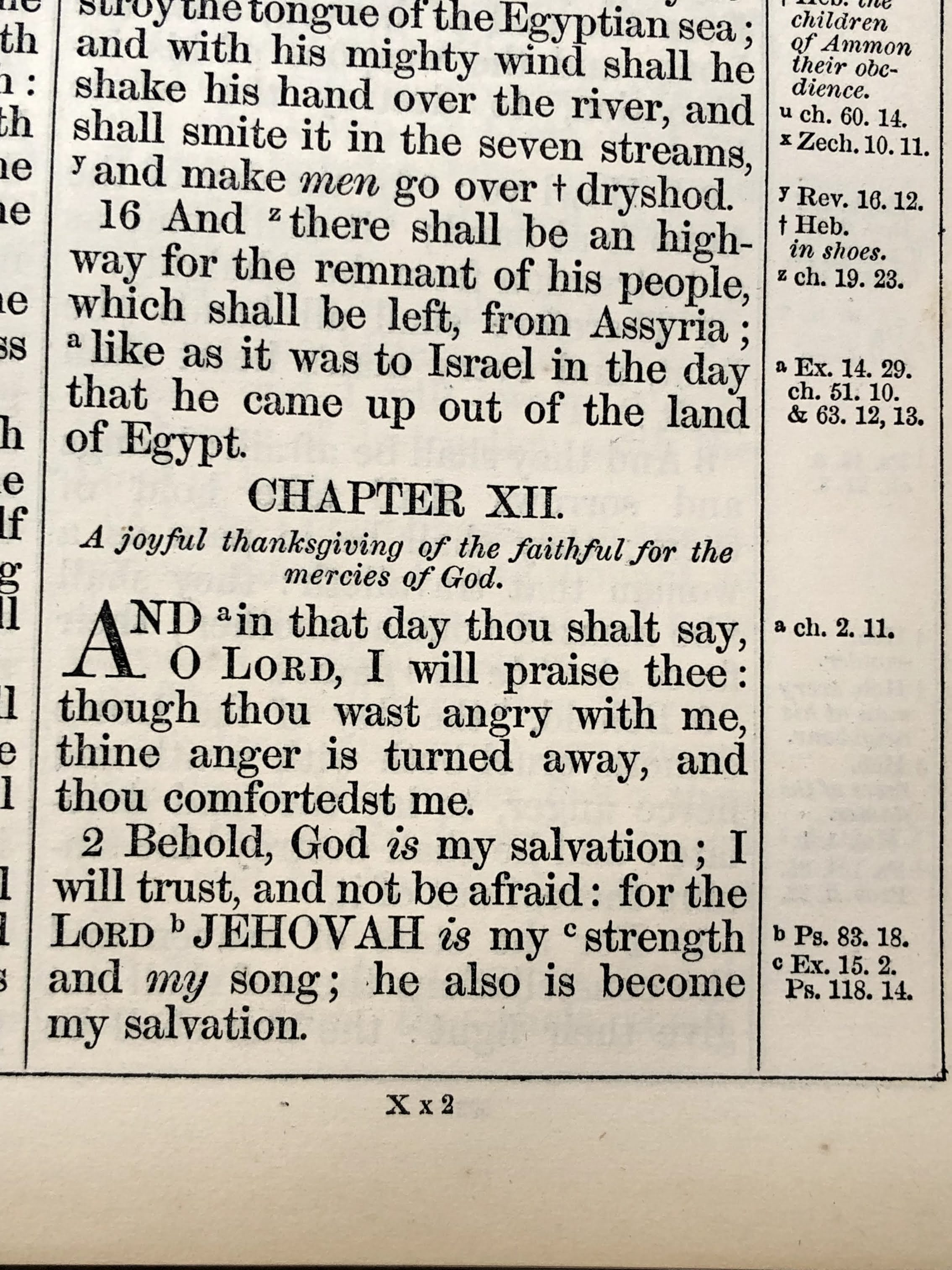
Jehovah in King James Bible 1853 Isaiah 12:2

- Young's Literal Translation by Robert Young (1862, 1898) renders the Tetragrammaton as Jehovah 6,831 times.
- The Julia E. Smith Parker Translation (1876) considered the first complete translation of the Bible into English by a woman. This Bible version was titled The Holy Bible: Containing the Old and New Testaments; Translated Literally from the Original Tongues. This translation prominently renders the Tetragrammaton as Jehovah throughout the entire Old Testament.
- The English Revised Version (1881–1885, published with the Apocrypha in 1894) renders the Tetragrammaton as Jehovah where it appears in the King James Version, and another eight times in Exodus 6:2,6–8, Psalm 68:20, Isaiah 49:14, Jeremiah 16:21 and Habakkuk 3:19.
- The Darby Bible (1890) by John Nelson Darby renders the Tetragrammaton as Jehovah 6,810 times.
- The American Standard Version (1901) renders the Tetragrammaton as Je-ho'vah in 6,823 places in the Old Testament.(Note: The Watchtower Edition of the ASV renders Jehovah in 6,870 places in the Old Testament, 47 more times than in mainstream editions.)
- The Modern Reader's Bible (1914) an annotated reference study Bible based on the English Revised Version of 1894 by Richard Moulton, renders Jehovah where it appears in the English Revised Version of 1894.
- The Holy Scriptures (1936, 1951), Hebrew Publishing Company, revised by Alexander Harkavy, a Hebrew Bible translation in English, contains the form Jehovah where it appears in the King James Version except in Isaiah 26:4.
- The Modern Language Bible—The New Berkeley Version in Modern English (1969) renders Jehovah in Genesis 22:14, Exodus 3:15, Exodus 6:3 and Isaiah 12:2. This translation was a revision of an earlier translation by Gerrit Verkuyl.
- The New English Bible (1970) published by Oxford University Press uses Jehovah in Exodus 3:15–16 and 6:3, and in four place names at Genesis 22:14, Exodus 17:15, Judges 6:24 and Ezekiel 48:35. A total of 7 times.
- The King James II Version (1971) by Jay P. Green, Sr., published by Associated Publishers and Authors, renders Jehovah at Psalms 68:4 in addition to where it appears in the Authorized King James Version, a total of 8 times.
- The Living Bible (1971) by Kenneth N. Taylor, published by Tyndale House Publishers, Illinois, Jehovah appears 428 times according to the Living Bible Concordance by Jack Atkeson Speer and published by Poolesville Presbyterian Church; 2nd edition (1973).
- The Bible in Living English (1972) by Steven T. Byington, published by the Watchtower Bible and Tract Society, renders the name Jehovah throughout the Old Testament over 6,800 times.
- Green's Literal Translation (1985) by Jay P. Green, published by Sovereign Grace Publishers, renders the Tetragrammaton as Jehovah 6,866 times.
- The 21st Century King James Version (1994), published by Deuel Enterprises, Inc., renders Jehovah at Psalms 68:4 in addition to where it appears in the Authorized King James Version, a total of 8 times. A revision including the Apocrypha entitled the Third Millennium Bible (1998) also renders Jehovah in the same verses.
- The American King James Version (1999) by Michael Engelbrite renders Jehovah in all the places where it appears in the Authorized King James Version.
- The Recovery Version (1999, 2003, 2016) renders the Tetragrammaton as Jehovah throughout the Old Testament 6,841 times.
- The New Heart English Translation (Jehovah Edition) (2010) [a Public Domain work with no copyright] uses "Jehovah" 6,837 times.

Bible translations with the divine name in the New Testament:

- In the anonymously-published 1808 New Testament in an Improved Version, upon the Basis of Archbishop Newcome's New Translation (for which Thomas Belsham later took credit) Jehovah is used six times, four in the main text and twice in footnotes.
- In the Emphatic Diaglott (1864) a Greek-English Interlinear translation of the New Testament by Benjamin Wilson, the name Jehovah appears eighteen times.
- The Five Pauline Epistles, A New Translation (1900) by William Gunion Rutherford uses the name Jehovah six times in the Book of Romans.
- The New World Translation (2013), Appendix C, lists 325 translations that use Jehovah or some variation, in many languages

Bible translations with the divine name in both the Old Testament and the New Testament: render the Tetragrammaton as Jehovah either exclusively or in selected verses:

- In the New World Translation of the Holy Scriptures (1961, 1984, 2013) published by the Watch Tower Bible and Tract Society, Jehovah appears 7,199 times in the 1961 edition, 7,210 times in the 1984 revision and 7,216 times in the 2013 revision, comprising 6,979 instances in the Old Testament, and 237 in the New Testament—including 70 of the 78 times where the New Testament quotes an Old Testament passage containing the Tetragrammaton, where the Tetragrammaton does not appear in any extant Greek manuscript.
- The Original Aramaic Bible in Plain English (2010) by David Bauscher, a self-published English translation of the New Testament, from the Aramaic of The Peshitta New Testament with a translation of the ancient Aramaic Peshitta version of Psalms & Proverbs, contains the word "JEHOVAH" approximately 239 times in the New Testament, where the Peshitta itself does not. In addition, "Jehovah" also appears 695 times in the Psalms and 87 times in Proverbs, totaling 1,021 instances.
- The Divine Name King James Bible (2011) – Uses JEHOVAH 6,973 times throughout the OT, and LORD with Jehovah in parentheses 128 times in the NT.

=== Non-usage ===
The Douay Version of 1609 renders the phrase in Exodus 6:3 as "and my name Adonai", and in its footnote says: "Adonai is not the name here vttered to Moyses but is redde in place of the vnknowen name". The Challoner revision (1750) uses ADONAI with a note stating, "some moderns have framed the name Jehovah, unknown to all the ancients, whether Jews or Christians."

Various Messianic Jewish Bible translations use Adonai (Complete Jewish Bible (1998), Tree of Life Version (2014) or Hashem (Orthodox Jewish Bible (2002)).

A few sacred name Bibles use the Tetragrammaton instead of a generic title (e.g., the LORD) or a conjectural transliteration (e.g., Yahweh or Jehovah):

- The Scriptures (ISR) Version (1993, 1998, 2009)
- Sacred Name King James Bible (2005)
- HalleluYah Scriptures (2009, 2015)

Most modern translations exclusively use Lord or LORD, generally indicating that the corresponding Hebrew is Yahweh or YHWH (not JHVH), and in some cases saying that this name is "traditionally" transliterated as Jehovah:

- The Revised Standard Version (1952), an authorized revision of the American Standard Version of 1901, replaced all 6,823 usages of Jehovah in the 1901 text with "LORD" or "GOD", depending on whether the Hebrew of the verse in question is read "Adonai" or "Elohim" in Jewish practice. A footnote on Exodus 3:15 says: "The word LORD when spelled with capital letters, stands for the divine name, YHWH." The preface states: "The word 'Jehovah' does not accurately represent any form of the name ever used in Hebrew".
- The New American Bible (1970, revised 1986, 1991). Its footnote to Genesis 4:25–26 says: "... men began to call God by his personal name, Yahweh, rendered as "the LORD" in this version of the Bible."
- The New American Standard Bible (1971, updated 1995), another revision of the 1901 American Standard Version, followed the example of the Revised Standard Version. Its footnotes to Exodus 3:14 and 6:3 state: "Related to the name of God, YHWH, rendered LORD, which is derived from the verb HAYAH, to be"; "Heb YHWH, usually rendered LORD". In its preface it says: "It is known that for many years YHWH has been transliterated as Yahweh, however no complete certainty attaches to this pronunciation."
- The Bible in Today's English (Good News Bible), published by the American Bible Society (1976). Its preface states: "the distinctive Hebrew name for God (usually transliterated Jehovah or Yahweh) is in this translation represented by 'The Lord'." A footnote to Exodus 3:14 states: "I am sounds like the Hebrew name Yahweh traditionally transliterated as Jehovah."
- The New International Version (1978, revised 2011). Footnote to Exodus 3:15, "The Hebrew for LORD sounds like and may be related to the Hebrew for I AM in verse 14."
- The New King James Version (1982), though based on the King James Version, replaces JEHOVAH wherever it appears in the Authorized King James Version with "LORD", and adds a note: "Hebrew YHWH, traditionally Jehovah", except at Psalms 68:4, Isaiah 12:2, Isaiah 26:4 and Isaiah 38:11 where the tetragrammaton is rendered "Yah".
- The God's Word Translation (1985).
- The New Revised Standard Version (1990), a revision of the Revised Standard Version uses "LORD" and "GOD" exclusively.
- The New Century Version (1987, revised 1991).
- The New International Reader's Version (1995).
- The Contemporary English Version or CEV (also known as Bible for Today's Family) (1995).
- The English Standard Version (2001). Footnote to Exodus 3:15, "The word LORD, when spelled with capital letters, stands for the divine name, YHWH, which is here connected with the verb hayah, 'to be'."
- The Common English Bible (2011).
- The Modern English Version (2014).

A few translations use titles such as The Eternal:

- Moffatt, New Translation (1922).
- The Voice (2012).

Some translations use both Yahweh and LORD:

- The Bible, An American Translation (1939) by J. M. Powis Smith and Edgar J. Goodspeed. Generally uses "LORD" but uses Yahweh and/or "Yah" exactly where Jehovah appears in the King James Version except in Psalms 83:18, "Yahweh" also appears in Exodus 3:15.
- The Amplified Bible (1965, revised 1987) generally uses Lord, but translates Exodus 6:3 as: "I appeared to Abraham, to Isaac, and to Jacob as God Almighty [El-Shaddai], but by My name the Lord [Yahweh—the redemptive name of God] I did not make Myself known to them [in acts and great miracles]."
- The New Living Translation (1996), produced by Tyndale House Publishers as a successor to the Living Bible, generally uses LORD, but uses Yahweh in Exodus 3:15 and 6:3.
- The Holman Christian Standard Bible (2004, revised 2008) mainly uses LORD, but in its second edition increased the number of times it uses Yahweh from 78 to 495 (in 451 verses) {2009 edition: 654 instances of Yahweh}.

Some translate the Tetragrammaton exclusively as Yahweh:

- Rotherham's Emphasized Bible (1902) retains "Yahweh" throughout the Old Testament.
- The Jerusalem Bible (1966).
- The New Jerusalem Bible (1985).
- The Christian Community Bible (1988) is a translation of the Christian Bible in the English language originally produced in the Philippines and uses "Yahweh".
- The World English Bible (1997) is based on the 1901 American Standard Version, but uses "Yahweh" instead of "Jehovah".
- Hebraic Roots Bible (2009, 2012).
- The Lexham English Bible (2011) uses "Yahweh" in the Old Testament.
- Names of God Bible (2011, 2014), edited by Ann Spangler and published by Baker Publishing Group. The core text of the 2011 edition uses the God's Word translation. The core text of the 2014 edition uses the King James Version, and includes Jehovah next to Yahweh where "LORD Jehovah" appears in the source text. The print edition of both versions have divine names printed in brown and includes a commentary. Both editions use "Yahweh" in the Old Testament.
- The Sacred Scriptures Bethel Edition (1981) is a Sacred Name Bible which uses the name "Yahweh" in both the Old and New Testaments (Chamberlin pp. 51–53). It was produced by the Assemblies of Yahweh elder, the late Jacob O. Meyer, based on the American Standard Version of 1901.

== Other usage ==
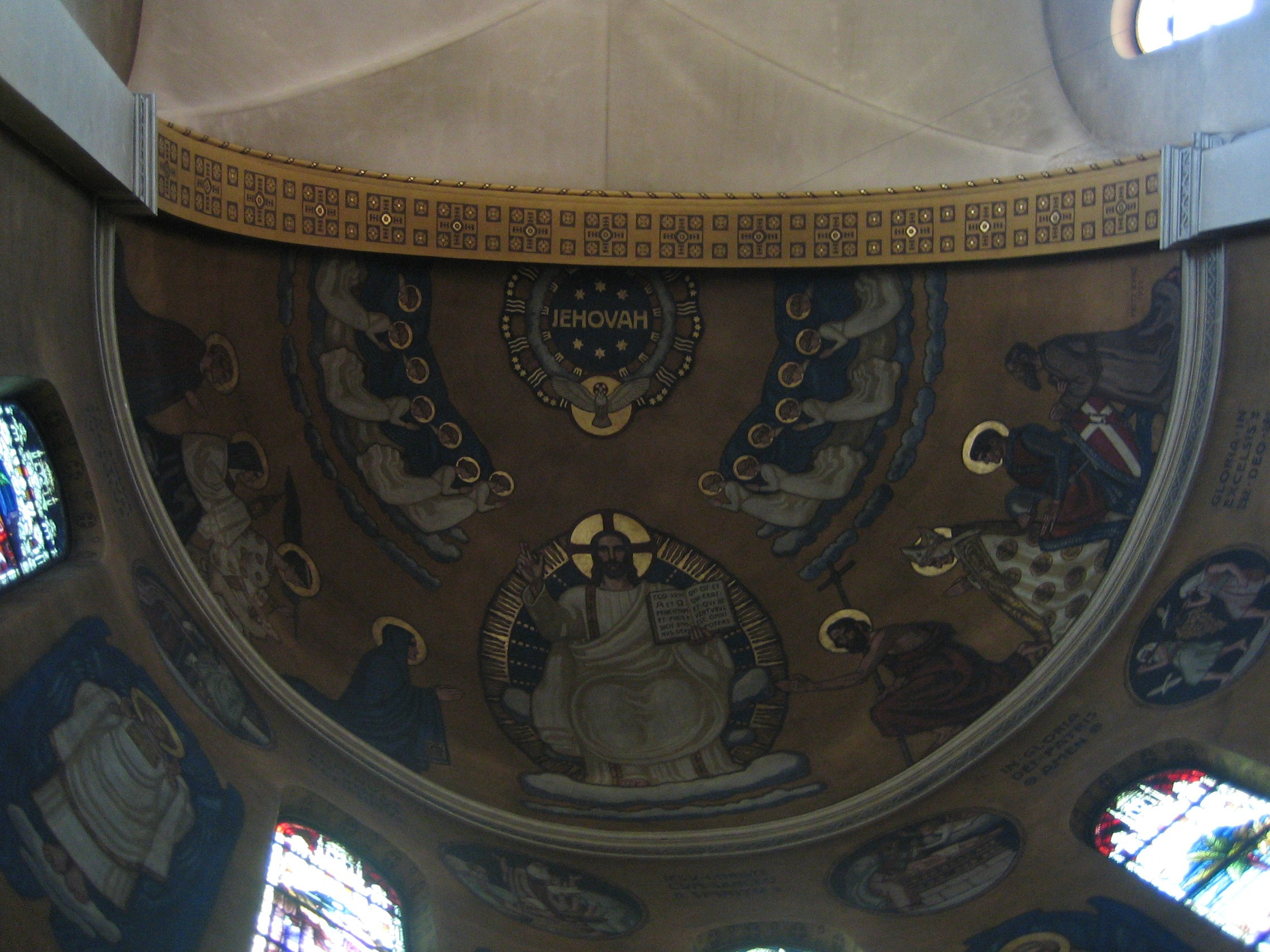
Semi-dome over apse in Saint Martin's Catholic Church of Olten, Switzerland, completed in 1910

Following the Middle Ages, before and after the Protestant Reformation, some churches and public buildings across Europe were decorated with variants and cognates of "Jehovah". For example, the coat of arms of Plymouth (UK) City Council bears the Latin inscription, Turris fortissima est nomen Jehova (English, "The name of Jehovah is the strongest tower"), derived from Proverbs 18:10.

Lyrics of some Christian hymns, for example, "Guide me, O thou great Jehovah", include "Jehovah". The form also appears in some reference books and novels, appearing several times in the novel The Greatest Story Ever Told, by Catholic author Fulton Oursler.

Some religious groups, notably Jehovah's Witnesses and proponents of the King-James-Only movement, continue to use Jehovah as the only name of God. In Mormonism, "Jehovah" is thought to be the name by which Jesus was known prior to his birth; references to "the LORD" in the KJV Old Testament are therefore understood to be references to the pre-mortal Jesus, whereas God the Father, who is regarded as a separate individual, is sometimes referred to as "Elohim". "Jehovah" is twice rendered in the Book of Mormon, in 2 Nephi 22:2 and Moroni 10:34.

== Similar Greek names ==
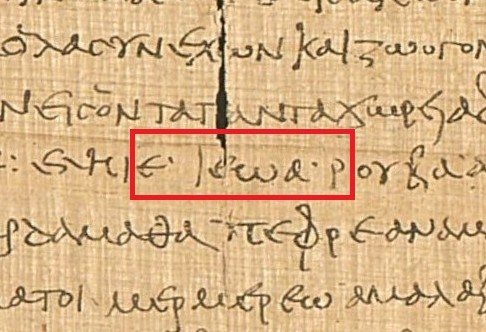
Similar Greek name Ιεωα in Col. 15 line 10 in PGM VII 531 dated to the 3rd-century CE.

=== Ancient ===
- Ιουω (Iouō, reconstructed Attic pronunciation: [juɔ]): Pistis Sophia cited by Charles William King, which also gives Ιαω (Iaō, pronunciation: [jaɔ]) (2nd century)
- Ιεου (Ieou, pronunciation: [jeu]): Pistis Sophia (2nd century)
- ΙΕΗΩΟΥΑ (I-E-Ē-Ō-O-Y-A, pronunciation: [ieɛɔoya]), the seven vowels of the Greek alphabet arranged in this order. Charles William King attributes to a work that he calls On Interpretations the statement that this was the Egyptian name of the supreme God. He comments: "This is in fact a very correct representation, if we give each vowel its true Greek sound, of the Hebrew pronunciation of the word Jehovah." (2nd century)
- Ιευώ (Ievō): Eusebius, who says that Sanchuniathon received the records of the Jews from Hierombalus, priest of the god Ieuo. (c. 315)
- Ιεωά (Ieōa): Hellenistic magical text (2nd–3rd centuries), M. Kyriakakes (2000)

=== Modern ===
- Ἰεχοβά (like Jehova[h]): Paolo Medici (1755)
- Ἰεοβά (like Je[h]ova[h]): Greek Pentateuch (1833), Holy Bible translated in Katharevousa Greek by Neophytus Vamvas (1850)
- Ἰεχωβά (like Jehova[h]): Panagiotes Trempelas (1958)

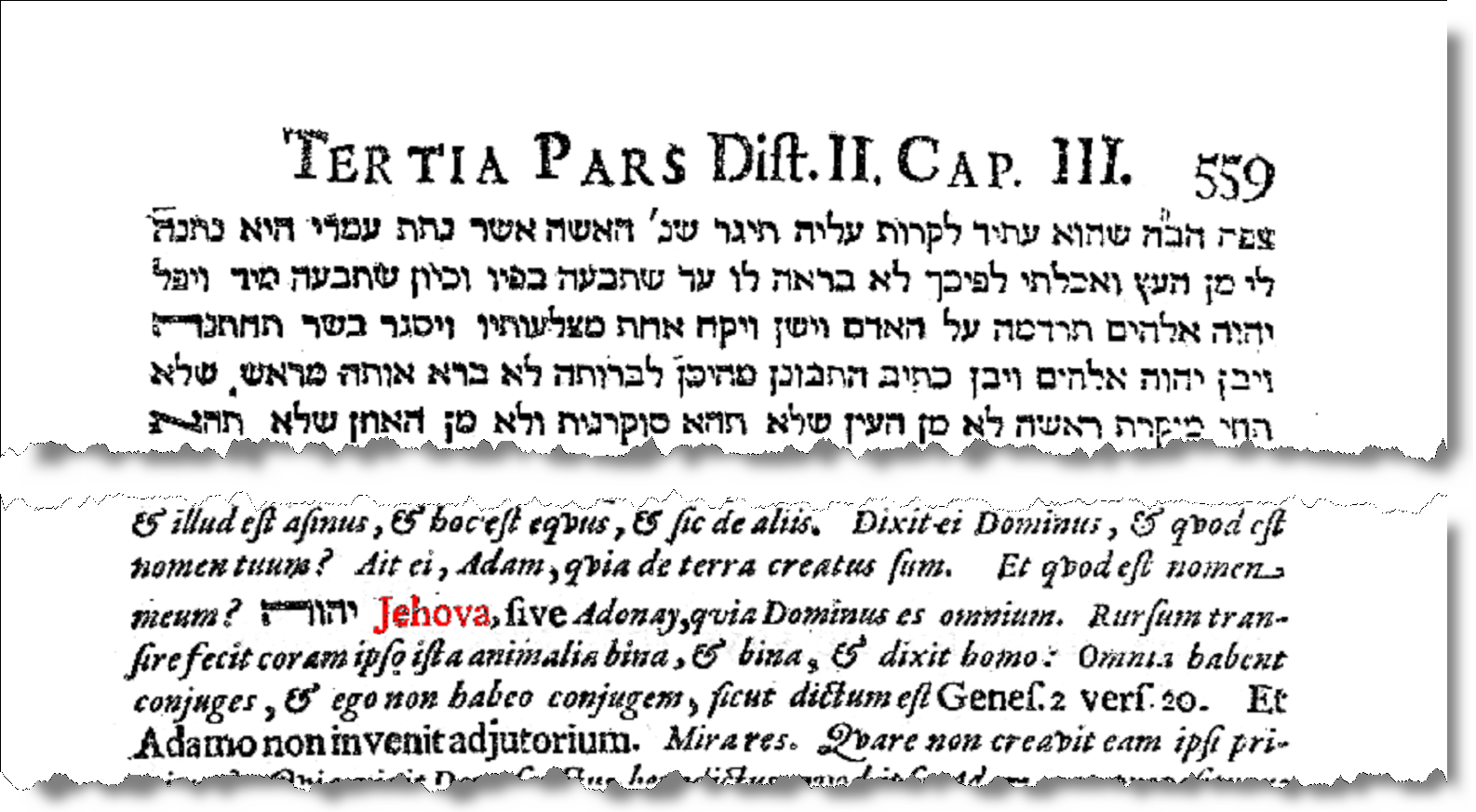
Excerpts from Raymond Martin's Pugio Fidei adversus Mauros et Judaeos (1270, p. 559), containing the phrase "Jehova, sive Adonay, qvia Dominus es omnium" (Jehovah, or Adonay, for you are the Lord of all)

== Similar Latin and English transcriptions ==
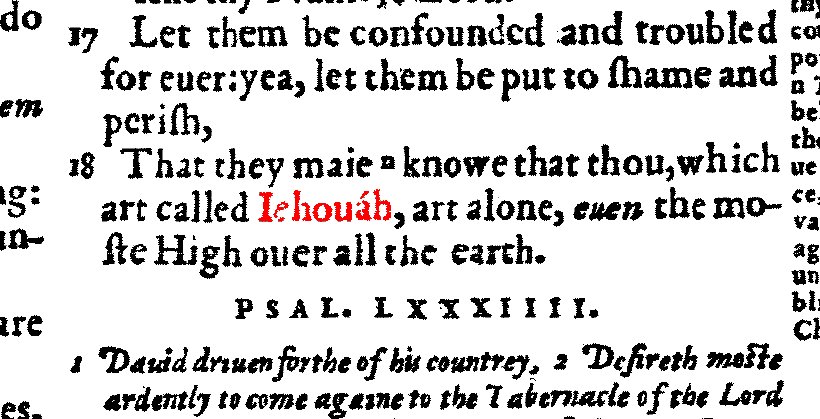
Geneva Bible, 1560 (Psalm 83:18)

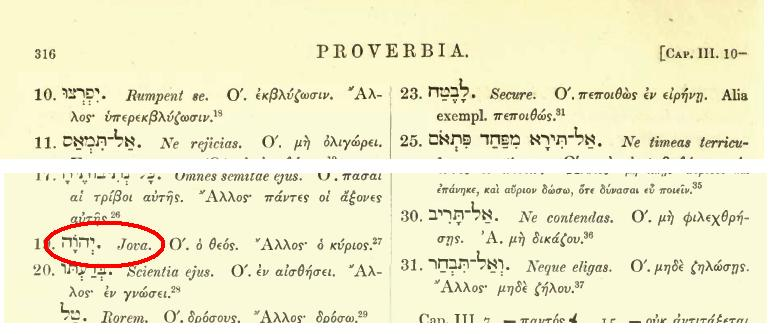
A Latin rendering of the Tetragrammaton has been the form "Jova". (Origenis Hexaplorum, edited by Frederick Field, 1875)

Transcriptions of יְהֹוָה similar to Jehovah occurred as early as the 12th century.

- Ieve: Petrus Alphonsi (c. 1106), Alexander Geddes (1800)
- Jehova: Raymond Martini (Raymundus Martini) (1278), Porchetus de Salvaticis (1303), Tremellius (1575), Marcus Marinus (1593), Charles IX of Sweden (1606), Rosenmüller (1820), Wilhelm Gesenius (c. 1830)
- Yohoua: Raymond Martin (1278)
- Yohouah: Porchetus de Salvaticis (1303)
- Ieoa: Nicholas of Cusa (1428)
- Iehoua: Nicholas of Cusa (1428), Petrus Galatinus (Galatinus) (1516)
- Iehova: Nicholas of Cusa (1428), Jacques Lefèvre d'Étaples (1514), Sebastian Münster (1526), Leo Jud (1543), Robert Estienne (1557)
- Ihehoua: Nicholas of Cusa (1428)
- Jova: 16th century, Rosenmüller (1820)
- Jehovah: Paul Fagius (1546), John Calvin (1557), King James Bible (1671 [OT] / 1669 [NT]), Matthew Poole (1676), Benjamin Kennicott (1753), Alexander Geddes (1800)
- Iehouáh: Geneva Bible (1560)
- Iehovah: Authorized King James Version (1611), Henry Ainsworth (1627)
- Jovae: Rosenmüller (1820)
- Yehovah: William Baillie (1843)
- Jahovah: Sebastian Schmidt (1696), Samuel Hammond (1899)

== See also ==
- El
- God in Christianity, God in Islam, God in Mormonism, God in the Bahá'í Faith
- I am that I am
- Jah
- Names of God
- Theophoric name
