= Gospel of the Egyptians =

The Gospel of the Egyptians is the name given to two completely separate works wholly independent of each other.

- The Coptic Gospel of the Egyptians, focusing on the gnostic interpretation of the biblical Seth
- The Greek Gospel of the Egyptians, a dialog conversation concerning the merits of celibacy
