= Porchetto =

Porchetto is an Italian surname. Notable people with the surname include:

- Clara Porchetto (born 1978), Italian retired swimmer
- Raúl Porchetto (born 1949), Argentine musician
- Victor Porchetto de Salvatici (died c. 1315), Italian Carthusian monk sometimes referred to as Porchetus

== See also ==
- Porchetta
- Porchetta (family name)
