= Papyrus 121 (Greek magical papyrus) =

3rd century papyrus from Egypt

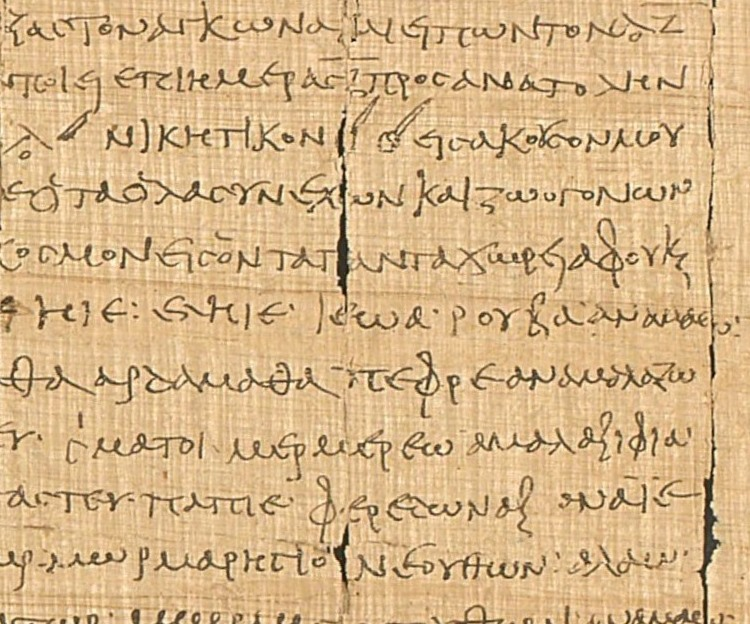
PGM 121 from 3rd-century CE

Papyrus 121 (signed as Pap. gr. CXXI, P.Lond. I 121 = PGM VII, TM 60204, LDAB 1321, MP3 0552 + 1868 + 6006 = Van Haelst 1077) is a Greek magical manuscript written on papyrus from the 3rd century CE. It is one of the Greek Magical Papyri. The papyri had been brought from Egypt by Ernest Alfred Thompson Wallis Budge.

== Description ==
This manuscript is preserved in 19 columns, and it has been written by an experienced scribe, who made use of various lectional signs, interpunction, decoration, accurate and regular semi-cursive, with some ligatures and abbreviations. Marks of elision are generally employed. This manuscript also is written along the fibres in columns of 38–40 lines by two hands.

The manuscript is magical, and contains different spells, and also Homeromanteion (Homer oracle). It is classified as magic, divination + medicine + poetry, epic, and lyric. The manuscript is dated between 225–320 CE.

== God's name IEŌA ==
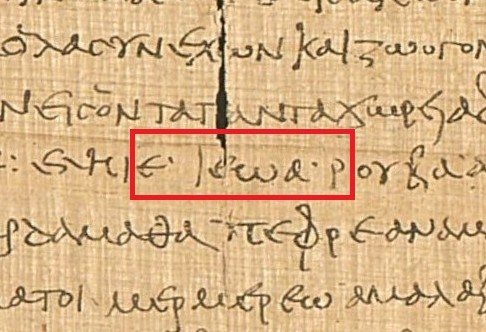
Ιεωα in Col. 15 line 10 (PGM VII 531).

This manuscript contains the Tetragrammaton ιεωα (IEŌA) written in col. XV, line 10 (PGM VII:531) in the Victory Charm. R. F. Hock transcribes and translates the text as follows:

Victory charm:
"Helios, Helios, hear me, NN, Helios, lord, Great God, you who maintain all things and who give life / and who rule the world, toward whom all things go, from whom they also came, untiring,
ĒIE ELĒIE IEŌA ROUBA ANAMAŌ MERMAŌ CHADAMATHA ARDAMATHA PEPHRE ANAMALAZŌ PHĒCHEIDEU ENEDEREU SIMATOI MERMEREŌ AMALAXIPHIA MERSIPHIA EREME THASTEU PAIE PHEREDŌNAX ANAIE / GELEŌ AMARA MATŌR MŌRMARĒSIO NEOUTHŌN ALAŌ AGELAŌ AMAR AMATŌR MŌRMASI SOUTHŌN ANAMAŌ GALAMARARMA.
Hear me, lord Helios, and let the NN matter take place on time".
Say this while you make an offering over oak charcoal, sacred incense, with which has been mixed the brain of a wholly black ram and the wheat meal of a certain plant.

Bernard Alfrink offers an explanation of the text:

However, there are a few cases that seem to suggest the pronunciation Jehovah. First, there is a passage from Pap. gr. CXXI of the British Museum (1. 528-540), where Preisendanz also thinks of Jehovah, albeit with a question mark (Pr. II 24). It is a Kabbalistic formula that must be recited while burning holy incense mixed with the brains of a black goat and the flour of an unknown plant called Katananke on an oak wood fire. In this way, one will surely obtain what one asks for. Here is the formula: "Helios, Helios, hear me; Helios, lord, supreme god, who holds the universe and creates all life and reigns over the world, to whom all things are directed and from whom all things proceed, tireless." This is followed by a long series of magical words that are quite incomprehensible and, moreover, have nothing to do with the matter, but which begin with the words: ηιε: εληιε Ιεωα. The first two words contain the double ηλιε ηλιε, which also appears in 1. 528. The third word clearly recalls Jehovah. It cannot be part of the seven-vowel name of God, because it does not appear anywhere in this six-line Kabbalistic formula. The formula is composed of all kinds of other magical words, which are incomprehensible in themselves, but which are clearly unrelated to the many other formulas composed of fragments of the seven-vowel name. A combination with the following enigmatic word of the formula (ρουβα) also offers no possibilities. It appears to be an independent quantity, which must be considered, alongside the repeated Helios, as another name for the deity. And this name is easily understood if one is allowed to think of the hybrid form of Jehovah.

The name Ιεωα is rare and found in a few papyri, for example in the Greek Gospel of the Egyptians.

== Actual location ==
This manuscript is currently kept in the British Library (London) as Papyrus 121.
