= Saint Martin's Church (Olten) =

Church of St. Martin
- German: St. Martinskirche Olten
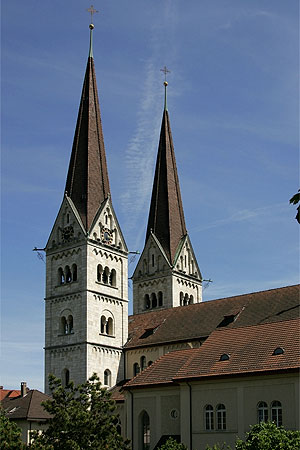

- St. Martin Church
- 47.35102°N 7.89867°E
- Country: Switzerland
- Denomination: Roman Catholic
- Website: St. Martin Olten

Architecture
- Architect: August Hardegger
- Style: Neoromanesque
- Completed: 1910

Administration
- Diocese: Basel
- Parish: St. Martin, Olten

St. Martin is a Roman Catholic church in the town of Olten (Switzerland). It is a three-nave columned basilica without transept with three chorapsideas.

The church is considered as the "most significant Neoromanesque Greater Church of Switzerland from the late period of historicism".

== Building history ==
In addition to the 1876 built by the Roman Catholic parish Olten Notkirche St. Gallen architect August Hardegger built from 1908 to 1910, the large neo-Romanesque parish church. The new church has even more than the seats than the Solothurn Cathedral, making it the largest clearance Church in Canton Solothurn. The former makeshift church was rebuilt to Pfarreireumen and Josef Hall.

== Organ ==
The first organ was of Orgelbau Goll (Lucerne) built with 33 registers. 1932 built the organ builder Willisau AG a new organ with 49 registers, which in 1949 reorganized by the organ builder Goll and extended to 64 registers.

The present organ was of Mathis Orgelbau (Näfels) newly built 1992nd The instrument has 50 stops on three manuals and pedal. The play and Registertrakturen mechanically.

== Gallery ==
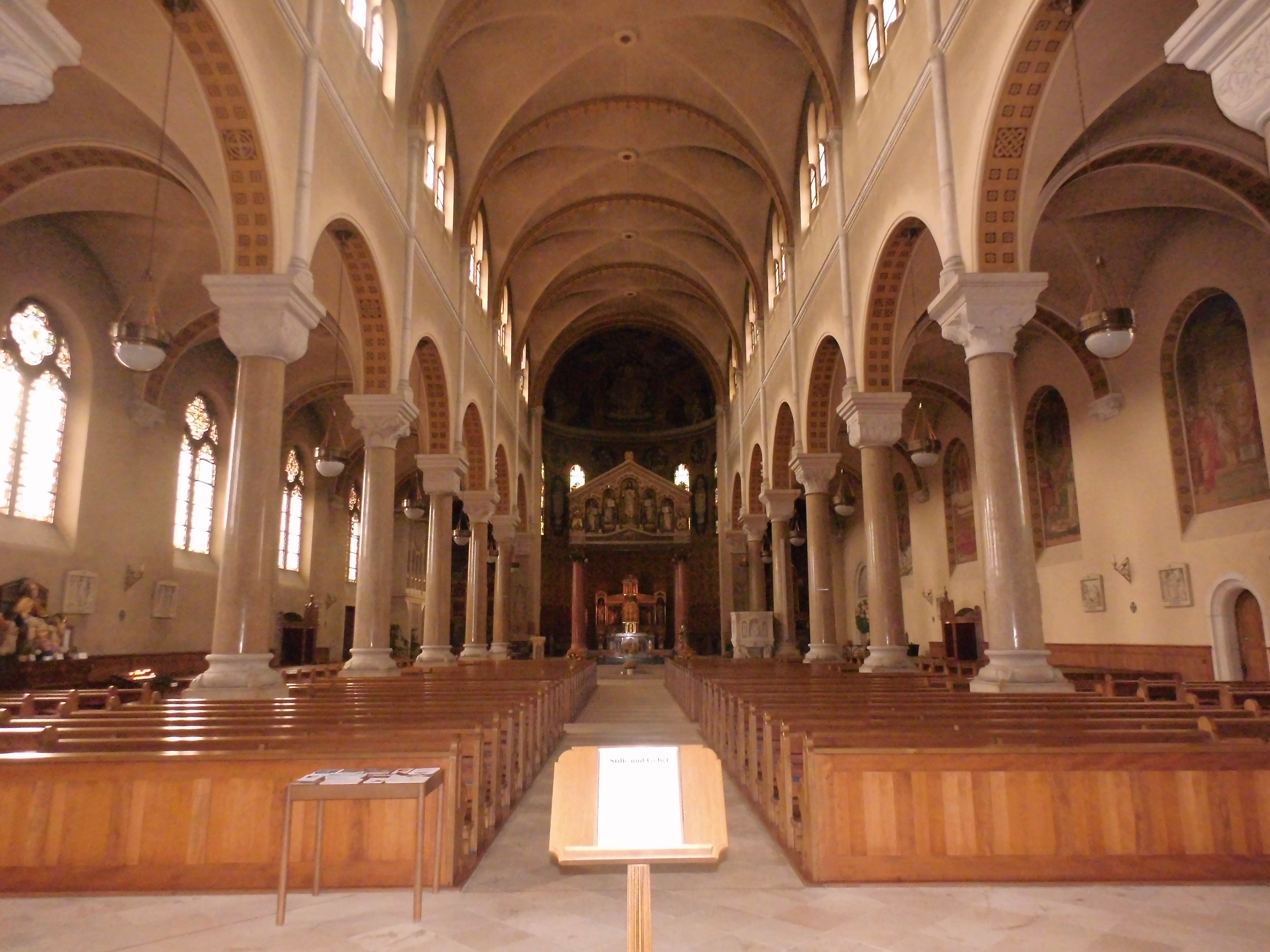
A view of the chancel of Saint Martin's Church from the nave

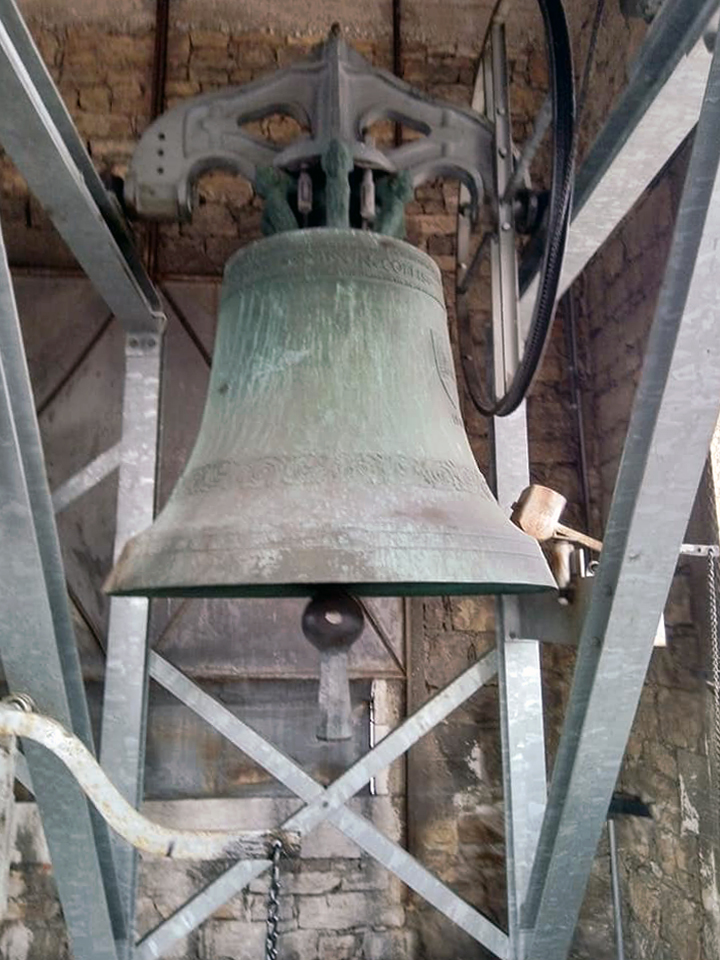
A church bell of Saint Martin's Church

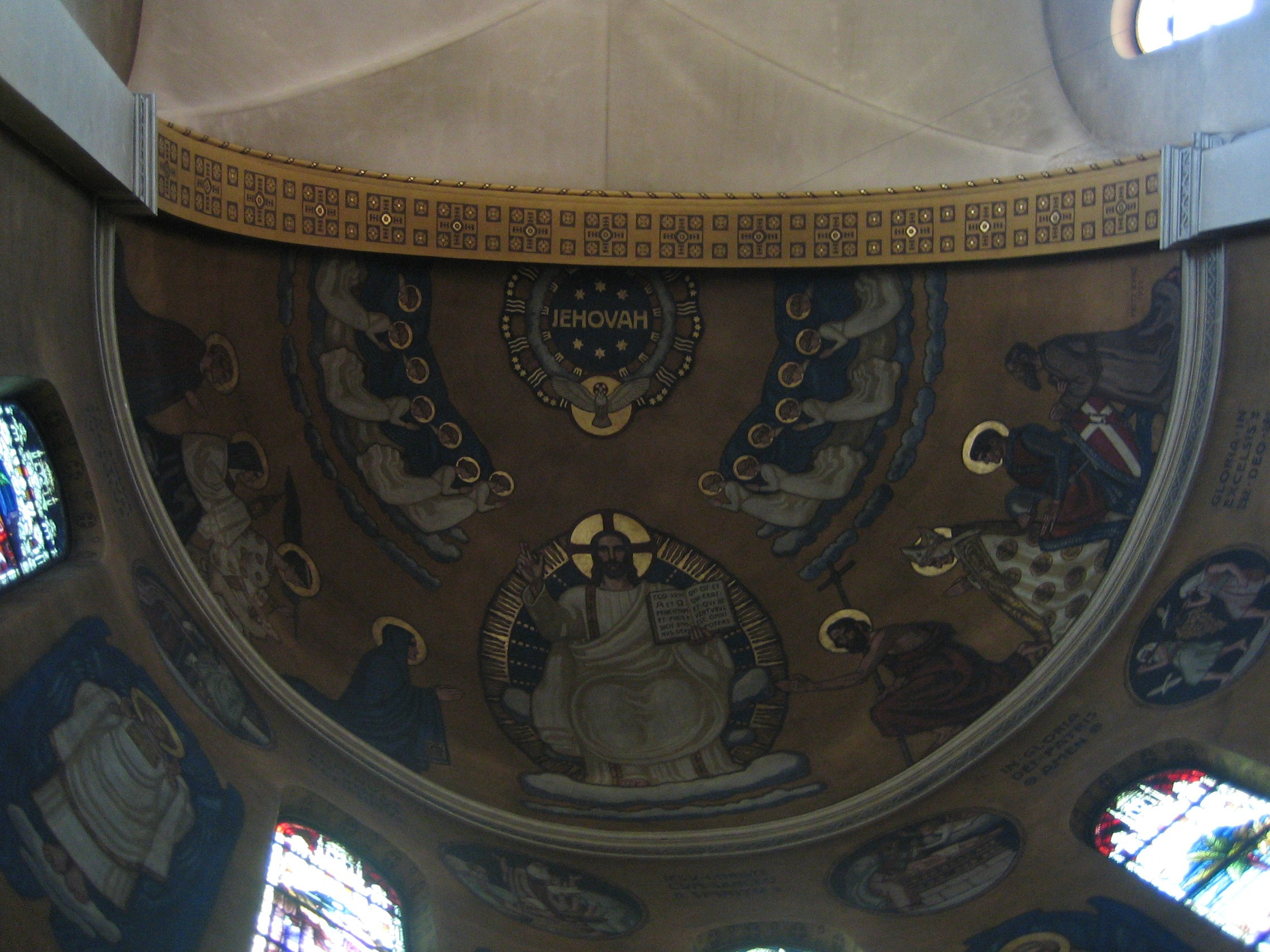
The divine name of God, Jehovah, depicted in the apse of Saint Martin's Church

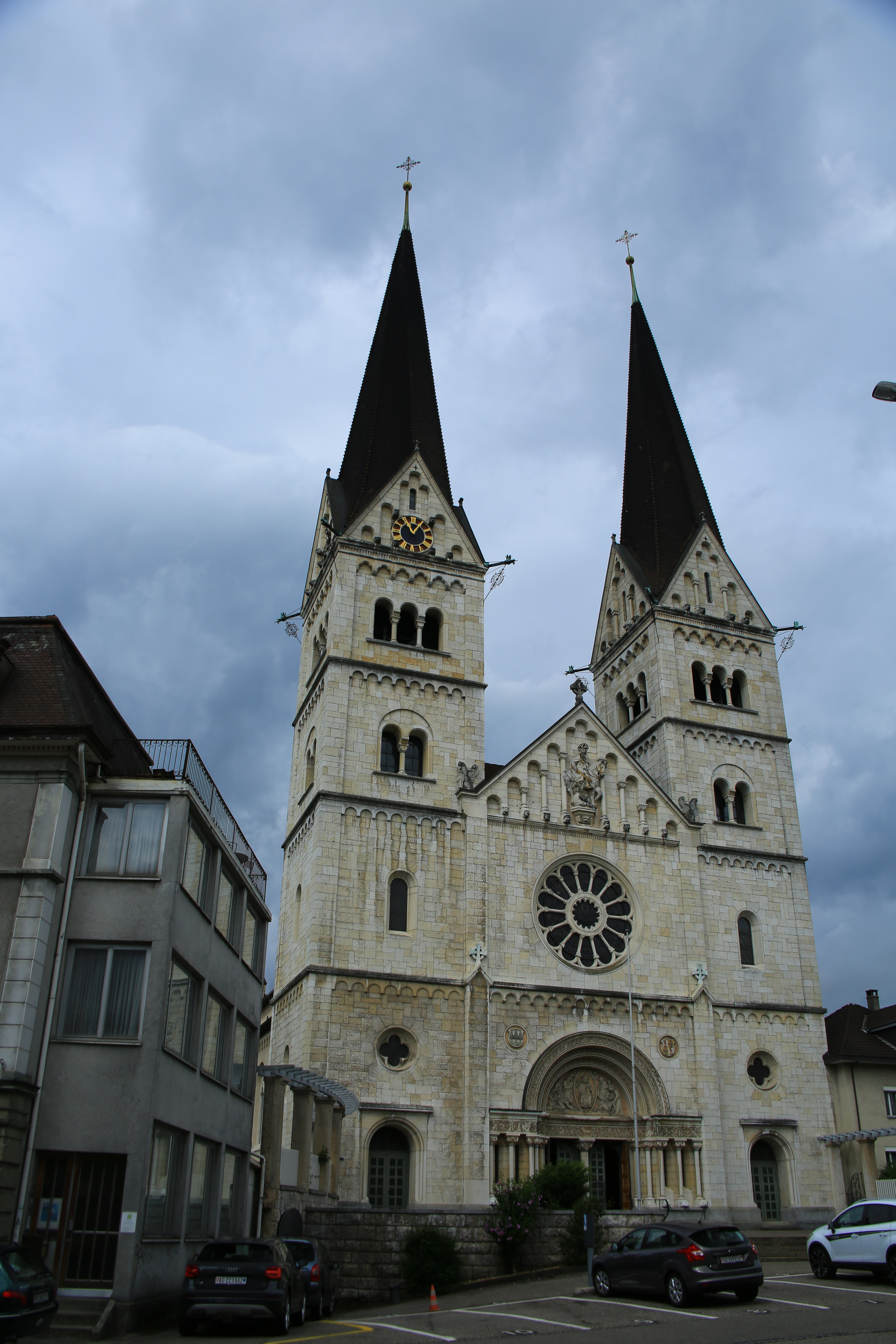
The outside of Saint Martin's Church
