= Greek Gospel of the Egyptians =

Apocryphal gospel

The Greek Gospel of the Egyptians (Greek: Ἑλληνικὸν Εὐαγγέλιον τῶν Αἰγυπτίων) is an early Christian religious text. Its title is adopted from its opening line.

== Dating ==
The Greek Gospel of the Egyptians, distinct from the later, wholly Gnostic Coptic Gospel of the Egyptians, is believed to have been written in the second quarter of the 2nd century.

== Textual Transmission ==
It was cited in Clement of Alexandria's work, the Stromata, where quotations provide many of the brief excerpts that are all that remain. Additionally, pseudo-Hippolytus mentions it in the Refutation of All Heresies, alluding to "these various changes of the soul, set forth in the Gospel entitled according to the Egyptians," and connects it with the Gnostic Naassenes. Later, Epiphanius of Salamis, a 4th-century collector of heresies, asserts that the Sabellians made use of this gospel, although it is unlikely he had firsthand information about Sabellius, who taught in the early 3rd century.

== Content ==
From the few fragments, it is unknown how much more extensive the contents were, or what other matters they discussed, or whether the known fragments present essentially the nature of the whole entity, which is apparently a "sayings" tradition worked into the familiar formula of a duologue. Also, due to the fragmentary nature, it is unknown whether it constitutes a version of some other known text.

The Gospel of the Egyptians was apparently read in Egyptian churches in the 2nd and 3rd centuries.

The known fragments of text takes the form of a discussion between the disciple Salome and Jesus, who advocates celibacy, or, more accurately, "each fragment endorses sexual asceticism as the means of breaking the lethal cycle of birth and of overcoming the alleged sinful differences between male and female, enabling all persons to return to what was understood to be their primordial and androgynous state" (Cameron 1982). The familiar question of Salome— "How long shall death prevail?" provoking Jesus' famous answer "As long as women bear children"— has echoes in other 2nd and 3rd century apocrypha and is instanced by Theodotus of Byzantium as if it were commonly known: "67. And when the Saviour says to Salome that there shall be death as long as women bear children, he did not say it as abusing birth, for that is necessary for the salvation of believers." This saying must have had a wide circulation, though it did not suit the purpose of any canonical Gospel. A similar view of the body as an entrapment of the soul was an essential understanding of Gnosticism. The rejection of marriage was also supported by the Encratites and many of the other early Christian groupings praised celibacy, and therefore it is difficult to tell from what group the text originated.

=== God's name IEOUA ===
The name ιεηουωα (Iéèouôa), composed exclusively of seven vowels, each occurring twenty-two times, is attested in Codex III of the Greek Gospel of the Egyptians as a referent to God the Father.

O glorious name, really truly, o existing aeon, Iéèouôa (more exactly ιιιεεεηηηοοουυυωωωααα), his unrevealable name is inscribed on the table [...] the Father of the light of everything, he who came forth from the silence [...] he whose name is an invisible symbol. A hidden, invisible mystery came forth IÉOUÈAÔ (each vowel is repeat 22 times).

— Gérard Gertoux, "2.7 From Justin to Jerome [150–400]", The Name of God Y.eH.oW.aH which is Pronounced as it is Written I_Eh_oU_Ah: Its Story (2002)

Gertoux argues that the name IEOA is rare and that the occurrence of the Greek pronunciation IEOUA in the Gospel of the Egyptians and in several roughly contemporaneous manuscripts (i. e. PGM 121)—dating to a period prior to the Masoretic text—suggests that the pronunciation ΙΑŌ was not universally used.

== Comparison ==
Another comparable verse appended to the Gospel of Thomas, probably in Egypt, reads:

"114. Simon Peter said to them, "Make Mary leave us, for females are not worthy of life." Jesus said, "Look I shall guide her to make her male so that she too may become a living spirit resembling you males. For every female who makes herself male will enter the Kingdom of Heaven" (translation by Elaine Pagels and Marvin Meyer in Elaine Pagels, Beyond Belief [2003], pp. 241f).

The Second Epistle of Clement (12:2) closely paraphrases a passage that was also quoted by Clement of Alexandria (in Stromateis iii):

iii. 13. 92. "When Salome inquired when the things concerning which she asked should be known, the Lord said: When ye have trampled on the garment of shame, and when the two become one and the male with the female is neither male nor female." Clement adds, "In the first place, then, we have not this saying in the four Gospels that have been delivered to us, but in that according to the Egyptians."

The trope appears in the Gospel of Thomas, saying (37):

"When you strip naked without being ashamed, and take your garments and put them under your feet like little children and tread upon them, then [you] will see the child of the living" (Thomas, Layton translation).

For a somewhat later Gnostic work assigning a prominent role to Jesus' female disciples, see Pistis Sophia.

== See also ==
- List of Gospels
