= Pietro Colonna Galatino =

Italian friar and philosopher (c. 1464 – c. 1540)

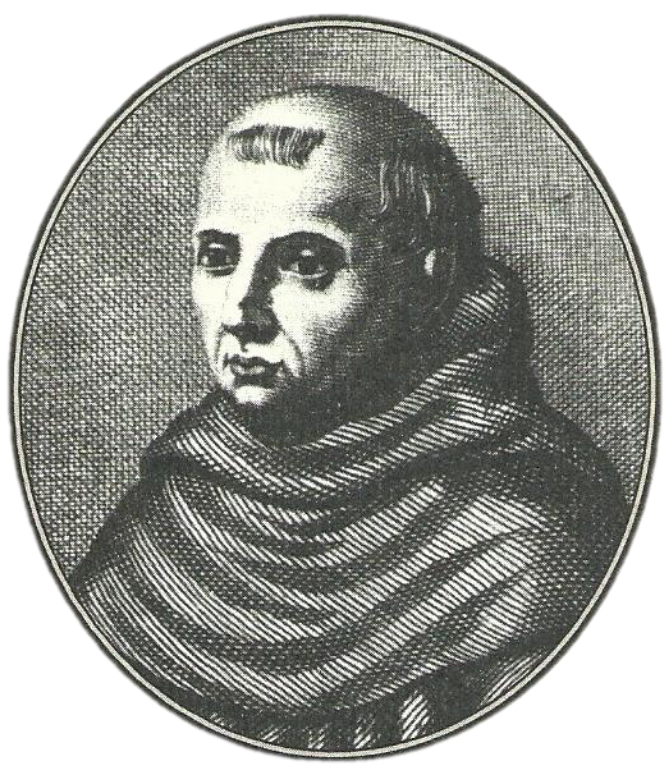
- Born: c. 1464; Galatina, Kingdom of Naples
- Died: c. 1540; Rome, Papal States
- Resting place: Santa Maria in Ara Coeli
- Other name: Petrus Galatinus
- Occupations: Friar Minor; theologian; orietnalist; philosopher
- Movement: Renaissance

Pietro Colonna Galatino (c. 1464 – c. 1540), also known as Petrus Galatinus, was an Italian Friar Minor, philosopher, theologian and Orientalist.

== Early life ==
Galatino was born at Galatina, in Apulia. He received the habit as early as 1480. He studied Semitic languages in Rome.

== Career ==
Galatino was appointed lector at the convent of Ara Coeli; he also held the office of provincial in the province of Bari, and that of penitentiary under Leo X.

He wrote his chief work De Arcanis Catholicae Veritatis, at the request of the pope, the emperor, and other dignitaries, in 1516, at which time, owing mainly to John Reuchlin's Augenspiegel, the famous controversy on the authority of the Jewish writings was assuming a very high-profile. Galatino took up Reuchlin's defence. Resolved to combat the Jews on their own ground, he turned the Cabbala against them, and sought to convince them that their own books yielded proof of the truth of the Christian religion, hence their opposition to it should be branded as obstinacy. Galatino is sometimes referred to as the inventor of the Latinized term and pronunciation Jehovah, by blending the Tetragrammaton "YHWH" with the vowels of "Adonai", although he only followed the Masoretic Text. He gave his work the form of a dialogue. The two conflicting Christian parties were represented by Capnio (Reuchlin) and the Inquisitor Jacob van Hoogstraaten. In conciliatory terms, Galatino responded to the queries and suggestions of the former, and refuted the objections of the latter. He had borrowed largely from the Pugio Fidei of the Dominican Raymond Martini, remodelling, however, the material and supplementing it with copious quotations from the Zohar and the Iggeret ha-sodot of the Jewish convert Pablo de Heredia.

In a long letter to Paul III (MS. Vat. Libr., cod. Ottob. Lat. 2366, fol. 300–308) he vehemently defended himself and his party against the charge of having forged the last-named book, which he firmly held to be the work of Rabbenu ha-Kadosh. Galatino was aware, no less than his critics, that his De Arcanis had many shortcomings, both in matter and form, and he begged his readers to consider that he was compelled to finish it within the space of a year and a half. The work became very popular and ran through several editions.

For the rest, Galatino's extensive knowledge and his thorough acquaintance with Greek, Hebrew, and Jewish Aramaic is fully borne out by his numerous other unpublished writings. He inveighs (or strongly protests) against the corruption among the clergy and discusses the question of reform. While engaged on his work De Vera Theologia his strength threatened to fail him by reason of his age and infirmity, but, having taken a vow to defend in the course of this work the doctrine of the Immaculate Conception of the Blessed Virgin, he instantly, so he tells us, recovered his strength and health (MSS. 52, 54, 60, St. Isidore's Coll.).

In 1539, Paul III, in a special Bull, bequeathed Galatino's works, about thirty in number, to the convent of Ara Coeli and enjoined that special care be taken of them. The manuscripts are now preserved in various Roman archives.

== Death ==
Galatino died in Rome. His grandnephew was Lorenzo Mongiò (1550–1630), bishop in Minervino, Auxiliary bishop in Salzburg and Valencia, archbishop in Lanciano and Pozzuoli.
