= Raymond Martini =

13th-century Catalonian Dominican friar and theologian

Raymond Martini, also called Ramon Martí in Catalan, was a 13th-century Dominican friar and theologian. He is remembered for his polemic work Pugio Fidei (c. 1270). In 1250 he was one of eight friars appointed to make a study of oriental languages with the purpose of carrying on a mission to Jews and Moors. He worked in Spain as a missionary, and also for a short time in Tunis. A document bearing his signature and dated July 1284 shows that he was at that time still living.

== Biography ==
He was born in the first half of the 13th century at Subirats in Catalonia; and died after 1284. According to Philippe Bobichon's analysis of the Ms 1405 (Sainte Geneviève Library, Paris), Raymond Martini converted during adulthood. In 1250 he was selected by the provincial chapter, sitting in Toledo, to study Oriental languages at a Dominican school which had been founded for the express purpose of preparing its pupils to engage in polemics against Jews and Moors. Subsequently he lived for a long time in a monastery at Barcelona.

== Censorship of the Talmud ==
In March 1264, he was commissioned, with the Bishop of Barcelona, Raymond of Penyafort, and two other Dominicans, Arnau de Segarra and Pere Gener, to examine the Hebrew manuscripts and books which the Jews, by order of the king, were to submit to them, and to cancel passages deemed offensive to the Christian religion. This is the first instance of Dominican censorship of the Talmud in Spain.

Their report was not severe, however, since Martí declared that many passages were confirmatory of the truth of Christianity, and that the Talmud should not be burned entirely (Pugio Fidei, ii.14, §8).

== Polemic literature ==
Martí was the author of two anti-Jewish books, one of which, the Capistrum Judaeorum, written in 1267, was first published in 1990. His refutation of the Koran is found in the work "De Secta Machometi".

There is at Bologna a manuscript of his Capistrum Judaeorum, aimed at the errors of the Jews; and at Tortosa a manuscript containing Explanatio simboli apostolorum ad institutionem fidelium which has a marginal note that it was edited "a fratre Ro Martini de ordine predicatorum".

Martí's work was for a long time the chief source for Dominican polemics.

== The Pugio Fidei ==
His chief work, the Pugio Fidei, was lost for a long time, but was finally brought to light by Justus Scaliger, and edited by Joseph de Voisin of the Sorbonne (d. 1685), with many notes, under the title Pugio Fidei Raymundi Martini Ordinis Prædicatorum Adversus Mauros et Judæos (Paris, 1651).

The work treats of God's omniscience, the Creation, immortality, and the resurrection of the dead, and proves the falsity of the Jewish religion; the latter part of the work is valuable on account of its extracts from the Talmud, the Midrash, and other sources.

This work was used by Porchetus de Salvaticis at the beginning of the 14th century in his Victoria Porcheti adversus impios Hebreos (printed 1520), by Hieronymus de Sancta Fide in his Hebraeomastix and elsewhere, and was plagiarized by Petrus Galatinus.

About 1620 François Bosquet discovered in the Collegium Fuxense (the Collège de Foix in Toulouse) a manuscript of the Pugio, and it was from this and three other manuscripts that de Voisin edited the work. Better known than this edition is its reprint by J. B. Carpzov (Leipzig and Frankfurt, 1687), with the anti-Jewish preface Introduction in Theologiam Judaicam. Both the 1651 edition and the 1687 edition are flawed and do not fully represent the work as preserved in the Paris Ste. Geneviève manuscript 1405, which shows signs of Martí's own corrections.

== Knowledge of Hebrew literature ==
Martí has been accused of forgery because of a few of his quotations from Genesis Rabbah, that were not otherwise known; but Leopold Zunz defends him against this charge (Gottesdienstliche Vorträge der Juden p. 300). The question remains open and hinges on the identity of the source referred to as "Rabbi Rachmon."

Martí was widely read in Hebrew literature, quoting not only from Talmudic and Midrashic works, but from Rashi, Abraham ibn Ezra, Maimonides, and Ḳimḥi. His fundamental views, which he attempts to substantiate by his citations, are that Jesus is announced in rabbinical literature as the Messiah and Son of God; that the Jewish laws, although revealed by God, are abrogated by the advent of the Messiah. Another prominent aspect of his contribution was the enumeration and rejection of the "tikkune soferim", alleged corrections made by Jewish scribes on the Biblical text. Martí directly and publicly charged these emendations upon the Hebrew scribes as "willful corruptions and perversions introduced by them into the sacred text."
