= Porchetus =

Italian theologian

Porchetus Salvagus (Victor Porchetto de Salvatici) (died c. 1315), sometimes referred to as Porchetus, was an Italian Carthusian monk from Genoa, Italy. Variants of his name include: Porcheus de Salva ignis, Salvagus, Salvagus Porchetus, Porchetus Salvagus, Salvaticus, de Salvaticis, Victor Porchetto de' Salvatici, Porchetto de Salvatici, and Porchetus de Salvaticis, etc.

He is known for his antisemitic work from c. 1303, Victoria adversus impios Hebraeos, in qua tum ex sacris litteris tum ex dictis Talmud ac cabbilistarum et aliorum omnium authorum quos hebraei recipiunt monstratur veritas catholicae fidei (which would not be printed until 1520).

The first part of his book enumerates proofs to demonstrate the epistemic truth of Christianity from the Holy Scriptures, and the second part similarly instances proofs from the Kabbalah and rabbinic literature. Porchetus' material was not original, copied mostly from the Pugio fidei of Ramon Martí of Catalan. Porchetus' book, in turn, was copied by later writers, such as Pietro Colonna Galatino. Its introduction (prologus) was reprinted by Johann Christoph Wolf in his Bibliotheca Hebraea (vol. 2, 1124–1127).
