= Olten =

- Municipality
- Old town with covered bridge

- Coat of arms
- Location of Olten
- Location within Switzerland Location within Canton of Solothurn
- Coordinates: 47°21′N 7°54′E
- Country: Switzerland
- Canton: Solothurn
- District: Olten

Government
  - Executive: Stadtrat with 5 members
  - Mayor: Stadtpräsident (list); Thomas Marbet SPS/PSS (as of August 2021)
  - Parliament: Gemeindeparlament with 50 members

Area
  - Total: 11.49 km^{2} (4.44 sq mi)
- Elevation: 396 m (1,299 ft)

Population (December 2020)
  - Total: 18,496
  - Density: 1,610/km^{2} (4,169/sq mi)
- Time zone: UTC+01:00 (CET)
  - Summer (DST): UTC+02:00 (CEST)
- Postal code: 4600
- SFOS number: 2581
- ISO 3166 code: CH-SO
- Surrounded by: Aarburg (AG), Boningen, Dulliken, Kappel, Rothrist (AG), Starrkirch-Wil, Trimbach, Wangen bei Olten, Winznau
- Twin towns: Altenburg (Germany)
- Website: olten.ch

Olten (German pronunciation: [ˈɔltn̩]; High Alemannic: Oute or Olte) is a municipality, a town in the canton of Solothurn in Switzerland and the capital of the district of the same name.

Olten grew into a town during the Middle Ages at the location of a bridge over the Aare. After a period of decline, it grew rapidly as a railway town in the 19th century. Its railway station is a major rail hub of Switzerland, located at the junction of lines to Zurich, Basel, Bern, and Lucerne, all of which are within 30 minutes by train, and the town is also home to a depot for Swiss Federal Railways.

== History ==
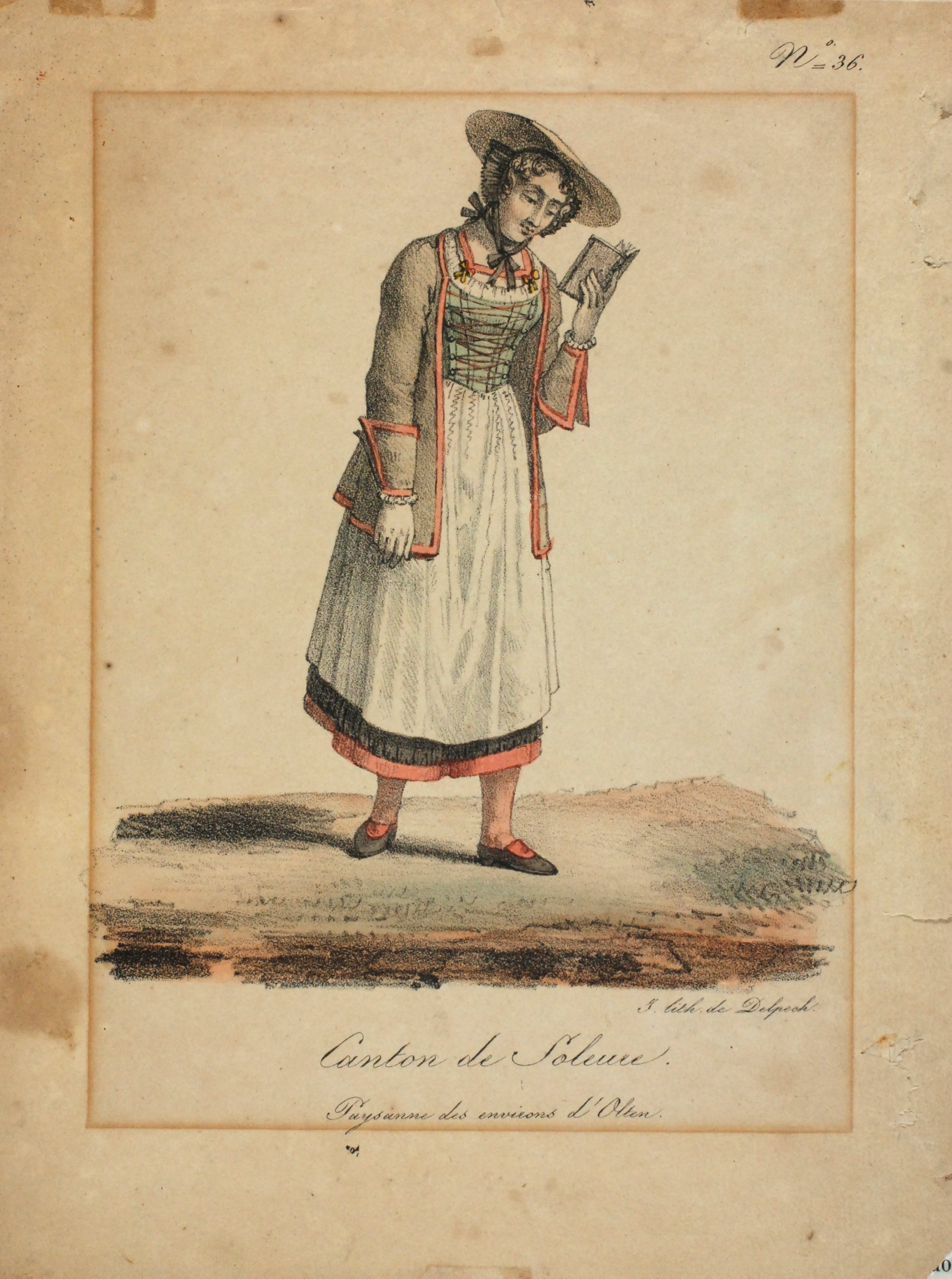
Peasant woman from Olten in traditional costume (c. 1800).

Aerial view from 400 m by Walter Mittelholzer (1919)

Significant amounts of artefacts of the Magdalenian (c. 16'000 to 14'000 years ago) have been excavated near Olten. There are also finds dated to the Mesolithic and Neolithic, but there is no trace of a settlement, and no ceramic finds; finds dating to the Bronze and Iron Ages are also rather limited. There was a vicus at the site during the Roman era. The name of the settlement is not known, but it seems to have been of a certain importance, presumably reflecting the presence of a bridge across the Aare. The Roman settlement was probably destroyed in the later 3rd century. At the end of the 3rd century, a fortification was built at the bridge-head, on the south-eastern corner of the earlier vicus. This fortress was abandoned in the 4th century, and later replaced by a larger castle, comparable to late Roman fortresses protecting crossings of the Aare at Solothurn and Brugg.

The medieval settlement was built on the foundations of the Roman castle. It is first mentioned in 1201, as Oltun (conjectured as continuing an *Olodunum, with the Gaulish suffix dunum "fort", and a prefix olo-, possibly from a hydronym, thus "river-fort"). It was in possession of the counts of Frohburg in the 13th century, passing to Kyburg in 1377 and to Habsburg in 1384. Olten passed under the administration of Basel in 1407, which invested in infrastructure, which was however destroyed in fires in 1411 and 1422. Basel lost interest in rebuilding the town again after the 1422 fire, and sold the settlement to Solothurn in 1426.

Throughout the medieval period, Olten was little more than a fortified bridge-head with some services (blacksmiths, taverns); its total population is estimated to about 500 people for the year 1600. Olten lost its city rights in 1653 as punishment for its support of the rebels in the Swiss Peasant War. This resulted in a lasting tradition of resistance against authority in Olten, and the town welcomed as liberators the French troops in the 1798 invasion. In 1814, Solothurn suppressed another rebellion of Olten patriots against the Swiss Restauration.

Olten first reached a population of 1,000 in the later 18th century. More rapid growth set in after the introduction of the railway in 1856, and the town became an industrial and infrastructural center, reaching 7,000 by 1900. By the 1880s, Olten had developed into a second urban center in the canton, and attracted more infrastructure such as the cantonal hospital (1880), a business school (1912), a cantonal gymnasium (1938). Population tripled again during the 20th century, reaching 21,000 in 1970, but has slightly decreased since.

== Geography ==
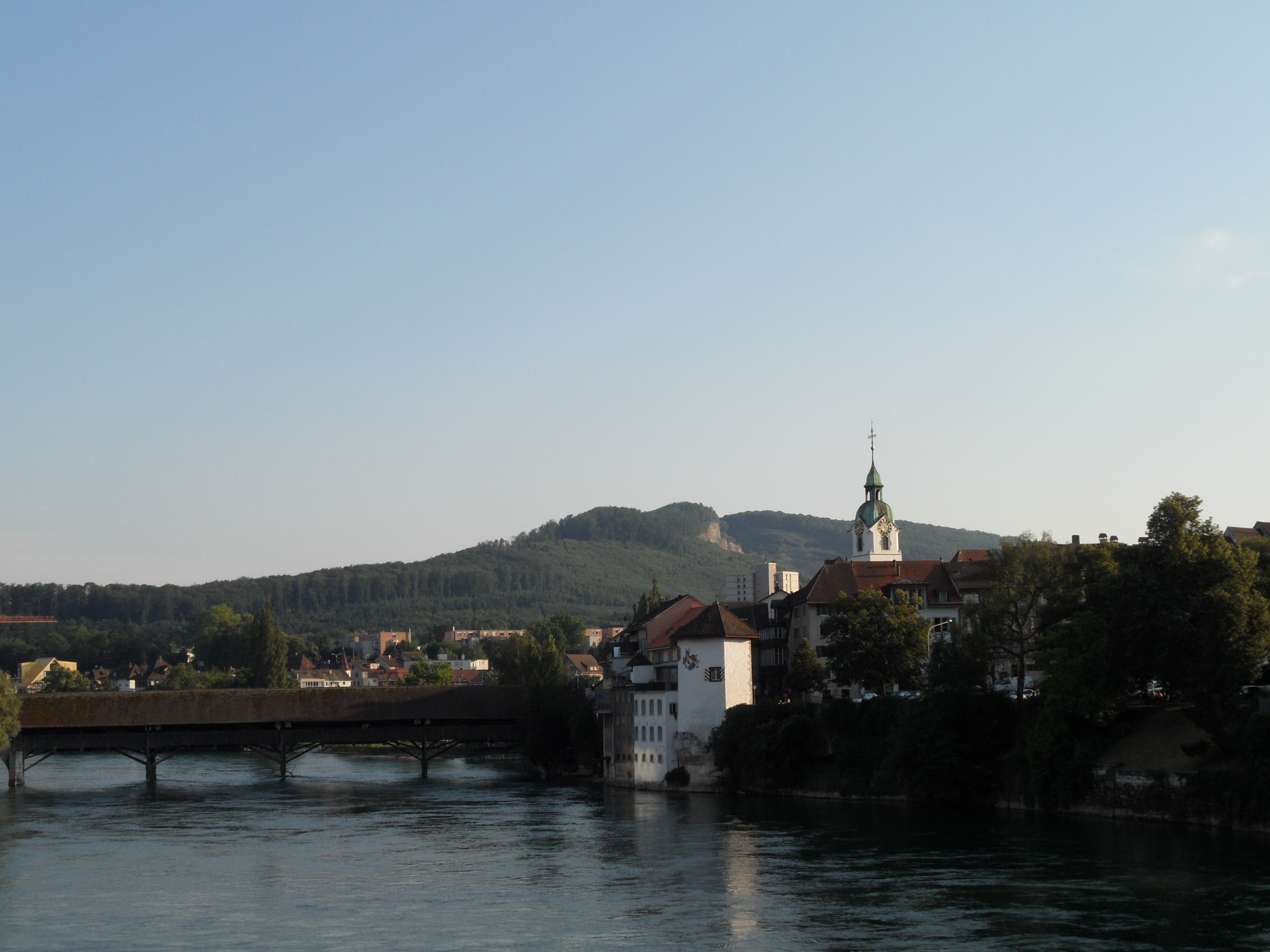
The river Aare at the old city of Olten

Olten has an area, as of 2009, of 11.49 square kilometres (4.44 sq mi). Of this area, 1.46 square kilometres (0.56 sq mi) or 12.7% is used for agricultural purposes, while 4.81 square kilometres (1.86 sq mi) or 41.9% is forested. Of the rest of the land, 4.65 km^{2} (1.80 sq mi) or 40.5% is settled (buildings or roads), 0.53 km^{2} (0.20 sq mi) or 4.6% is either rivers or lakes and 0.06 km^{2} (14.83 acres) or 0.5% is unproductive land.

Of the built up area, industrial buildings made up 6.0% of the total area while housing and buildings made up 15.6% and transportation infrastructure made up 11.6%. Power and water infrastructure as well as other special developed areas made up 4.2% of the area while parks, green belts and sports fields made up 3.1%. Out of the forested land, 40.7% of the total land area is heavily forested and 1.1% is covered with orchards or small clusters of trees. Of the agricultural land, 6.2% is used for growing crops and 5.9% is pastures. All the water in the municipality is flowing water.

The old city of the capital of the Olten district is located in a bend of the river between the Aare and Dünnern rivers. In the 19th Century housing estates were built in the valley on both sides of the Aare between slopes of the Jura Mountains to the north and the Born, Säli und Engelberg mountains to the south.

== Coat of arms ==
The blazon of the municipal coat of arms is Argent three Fir Trees Vert trunked Gules issuant from a Mount of 3 Coupeaux of the second.

== Demographics ==
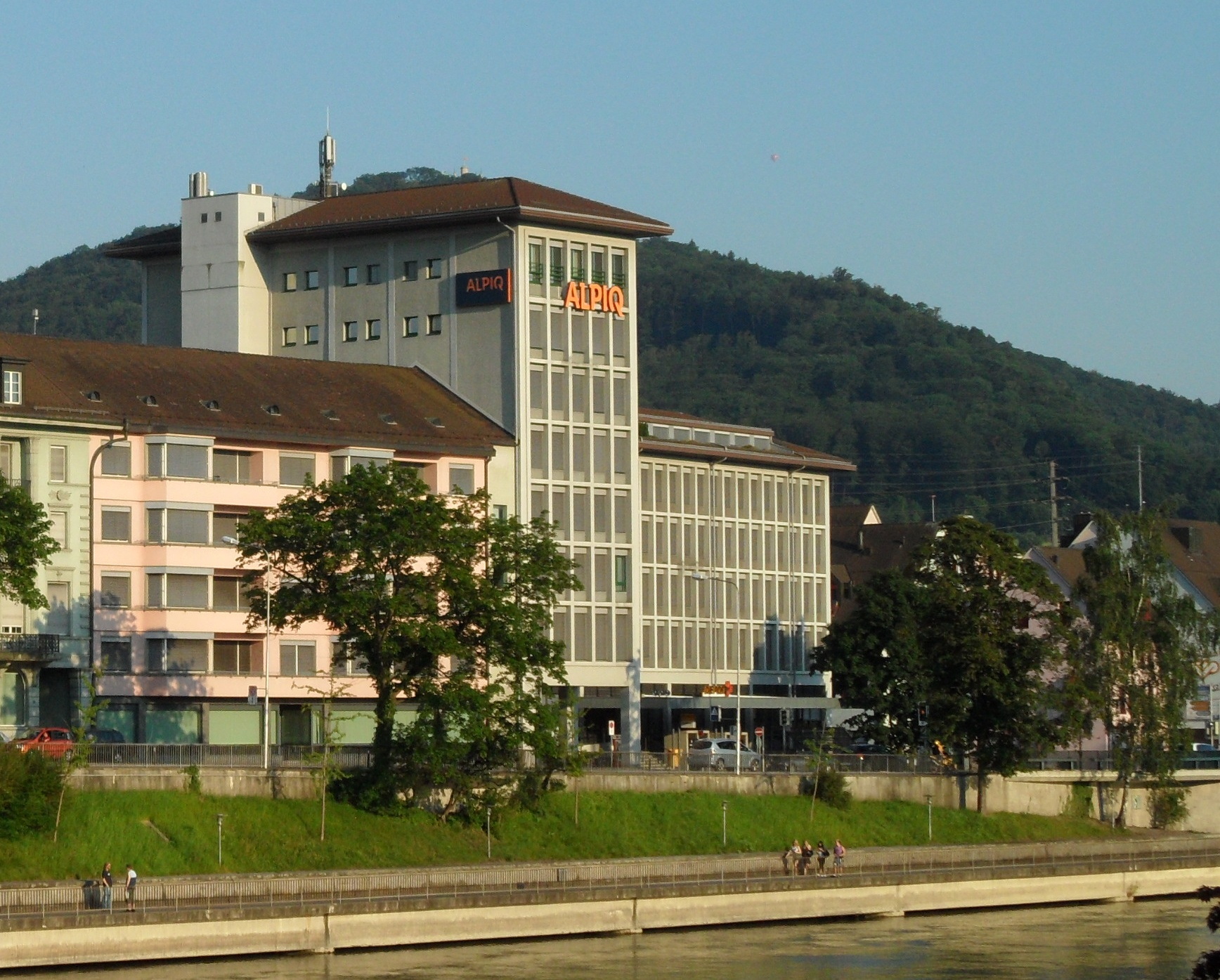
Alpiq building in Olten

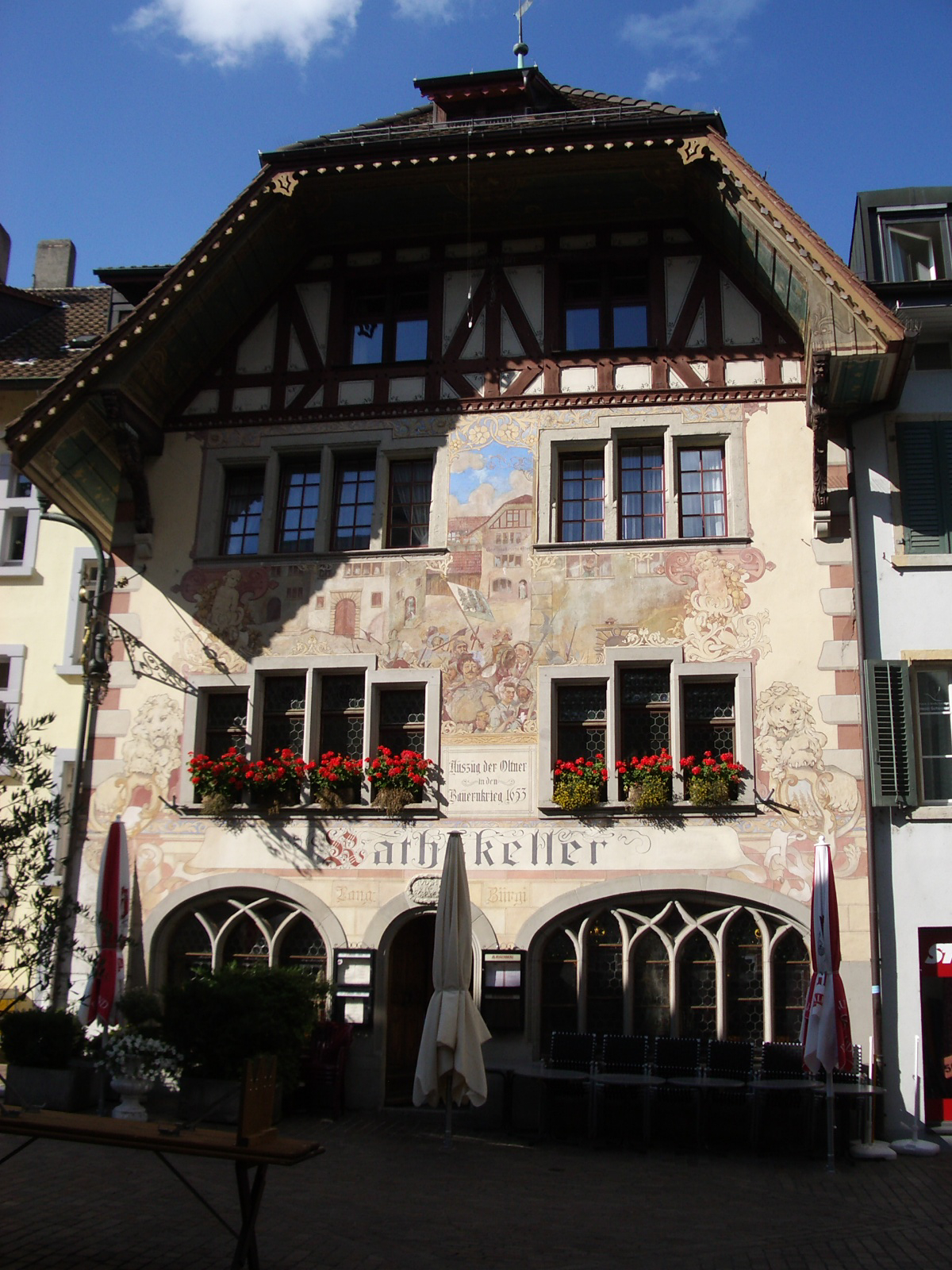
House in the Old Town

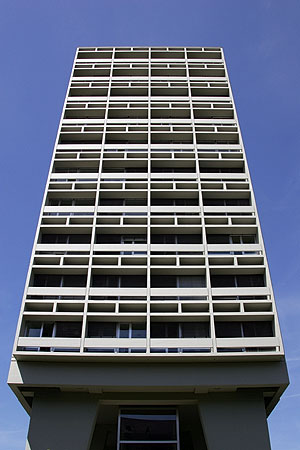
City hall of Olten

Olten has a population (as of December 2020) of 18,496. As of 2008, 27.3% of the population are resident foreign nationals. Over the last 10 years (1999–2009 ) the population has changed at a rate of 1.2%.

Most of the population (as of 2000) speaks German (13,855 or 82.7%), with Italian being second most common (844 or 5.0%) and Albanian being third (356 or 2.1%). There are 167 people who speak French and 22 people who speak Romansh.

As of 2008, the gender distribution of the population was 49.5% male and 50.5% female. The population was made up of 18,728 Swiss men (36.5% of the population) and 6,688 (13.0%) non-Swiss men. There were 20,186 Swiss women (39.3%) and 5,772 (11.2%) non-Swiss women. Of the population in the municipality 4,596 or about 27.4% were born in Olten and lived there in 2000. There were 2,920 or 17.4% who were born in the same canton, while 4,585 or 27.4% were born somewhere else in Switzerland, and 3,904 or 23.3% were born outside of Switzerland.

In 2008 there were 93 live births to Swiss citizens and 73 births to non-Swiss citizens, and in same time span there were 184 deaths of Swiss citizens and 18 non-Swiss citizen deaths. Ignoring immigration and emigration, the population of Swiss citizens decreased by 91 while the foreign population increased by 55. There were 6 Swiss women who immigrated back to Switzerland. At the same time, there were 82 non-Swiss men and 65 non-Swiss women who immigrated from another country to Switzerland. The total Swiss population change in 2008 (from all sources, including moves across municipal borders) was a decrease of 101 and the non-Swiss population increased by 37 people. This represents a population growth rate of -0.4%.

The age distribution, as of 2000, in Olten is; 1,011 children or 6.0% of the population are between 0 and 6 years old and 2,083 teenagers or 12.4% are between 7 and 19. Of the adult population, 956 people or 5.7% of the population are between 20 and 24 years old. 5,271 people or 31.5% are between 25 and 44, and 3,818 people or 22.8% are between 45 and 64. The senior population distribution is 2,497 people or 14.9% of the population are between 65 and 79 years old and there are 1,121 people or 6.7% who are over 80.

As of 2000, there were 6,700 people who were single and never married in the municipality. There were 7,504 married individuals, 1,356 widows or widowers and 1,197 individuals who are divorced.

As of 2000, there were 8,069 private households in the municipality, and an average of 2. persons per household. There were 3,535 households that consist of only one person and 325 households with five or more people. Out of a total of 8,221 households that answered this question, 43.0% were households made up of just one person and there were 59 adults who lived with their parents. Of the rest of the households, there are 2,246 married couples without children, 1,683 married couples with children There were 396 single parents with a child or children. There were 150 households that were made up of unrelated people and 152 households that were made up of some sort of institution or another collective housing.

In 2000 there were 1,439 single family homes (or 49.2% of the total) out of a total of 2,922 inhabited buildings. There were 933 multi-family buildings (31.9%), along with 304 multi-purpose buildings that were mostly used for housing (10.4%) and 246 other use buildings (commercial or industrial) that also had some housing (8.4%). Of the single family homes 379 were built before 1919, while 73 were built between 1990 and 2000. The greatest number of single family homes (702) were built between 1919 and 1945.

In 2000 there were 9,217 apartments in the municipality. The most common apartment size was 3 rooms of which there were 3,158. There were 677 single room apartments and 1,669 apartments with five or more rooms. Of these apartments, a total of 7,928 apartments (86.0% of the total) were permanently occupied, while 820 apartments (8.9%) were seasonally occupied and 469 apartments (5.1%) were empty. As of 2009, the construction rate of new housing units was 1 new units per 1000 residents.

As of 2003 the average price to rent an average apartment in Olten was 1063.57 Swiss francs (CHF) per month (US$850, £480, €680 approx. exchange rate from 2003). The average rate for a one-room apartment was 592.19 CHF (US$470, £270, €380), a two-room apartment was about 787.80 CHF (US$630, £350, €500), a three-room apartment was about 937.35 CHF (US$750, £420, €600) and a six or more room apartment cost an average of 1694.74 CHF (US$1360, £760, €1080). The average apartment price in Olten was 95.3% of the national average of 1116 CHF. The vacancy rate for the municipality, in 2010, was 1.85%.

The historical population is given in the following chart:

== Heritage sites of national significance ==
The Old City, which includes a Roman era vicus as well as medieval and early modern developments, Train Station, the prehistoric and Roman era hilltop settlement of Dickenbännli, the covered wooden bridge over the Aare and the Naturmuseum are listed as Swiss heritage sites of national significance. The entire town of Olten is part of the Inventory of Swiss Heritage Sites.

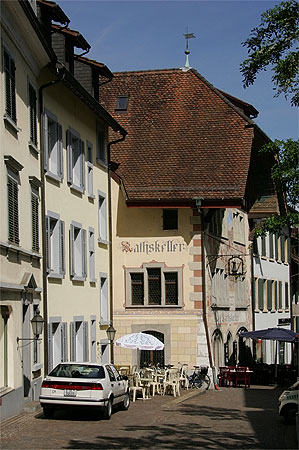
Old city of Olten

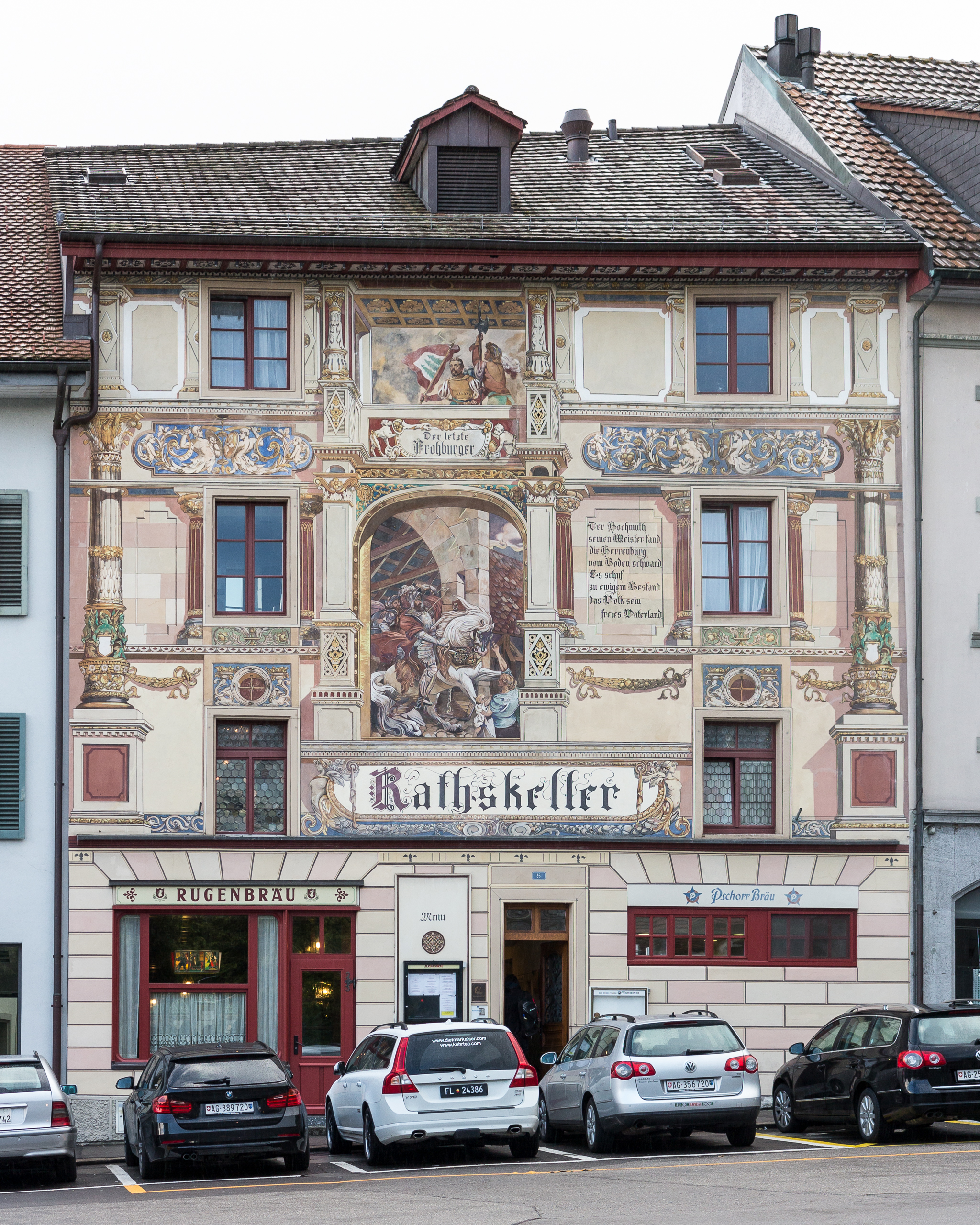
Rathskeller Olten

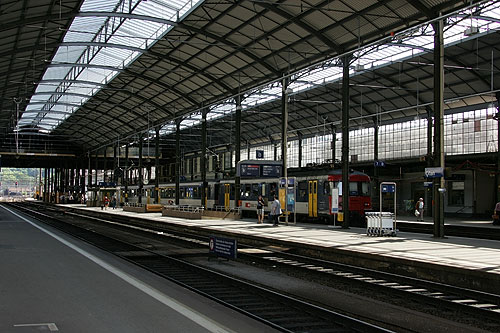
Train station

Olten's covered wooden bridge

== Culture ==
Every year, on 1 August, a large firework show occurs from boats floating down the river. It is also home to a wooden foot bridge, one of the towns landmarks. In Olten's railway station restaurant, the Gruppe Olten (Olten Group), a group of writers that included Max Frisch and Friedrich Dürrenmatt, was founded, as was the Swiss Alpine Club in 1863.

== Politics ==
In the 2007 federal election the most popular party was the SP which received 25.31% of the vote. The next three most popular parties were the SVP (21.42%), the FDP (18.61%) and the CVP (15.8%). In the federal election, a total of 5,515 votes were cast, and the voter turnout was 50.9%.

== Economy ==
Located at the crossroads of the most important west–east and north–south lines of Switzerland, Olten has been considered a railway town for more than 150 years. The Swiss Federal Railways is running here a central maintenance facility established in 1855 by Swiss Central Railway. The headquarters of SBB Cargo International are in Olten as well.

Swiss Prime Site, one of the most important real estate companies in Switzerland, has its head office in Olten today. In 1916, the Walter Verlag was founded by Otto Walter, where Otto F. Walter worked from 1956 to 1966. The former building is now used by the Alternative Bank Schweiz (ABS).

As of 2010, Olten had an unemployment rate of 4.4%. As of 2008, there were 19 people employed in the primary economic sector and about 7 businesses involved in this sector. 2,825 people were employed in the secondary sector and there were 147 businesses in this sector. 13,000 people were employed in the tertiary sector, with 1,067 businesses in this sector. There were 8,299 residents of the municipality who were employed in some capacity, of which females made up 43.8% of the workforce.

In 2008 the total number of full-time equivalent jobs was 13,275. The number of jobs in the primary sector was 14, of which 8 were in agriculture and 6 were in forestry or lumber production. The number of jobs in the secondary sector was 2,700 of which 1,465 or (54.3%) were in manufacturing and 976 (36.1%) were in construction. The number of jobs in the tertiary sector was 10,561. In the tertiary sector; 1,486 or 14.1% were in wholesale or retail sales or the repair of motor vehicles, 1,882 or 17.8% were in the movement and storage of goods, 577 or 5.5% were in a hotel or restaurant, 977 or 9.3% were in the information industry, 1,204 or 11.4% were the insurance or financial industry, 1,058 or 10.0% were technical professionals or scientists, 785 or 7.4% were in education and 1,356 or 12.8% were in health care.

In 2000, there were 11,508 workers who commuted into the municipality and 4,156 workers who commuted away. The municipality is a net importer of workers, with about 2.8 workers entering the municipality for every one leaving. Of the working population, 28.4% used public transportation to get to work, and 37.6% used a private car.

== Transport ==
The nearest airports to the town are EuroAirport Basel Mulhouse Freiburg, located 59 km (37 mi) north and Zurich Airport, located 71 km (44 mi) to the east of Olten.

== Religion ==
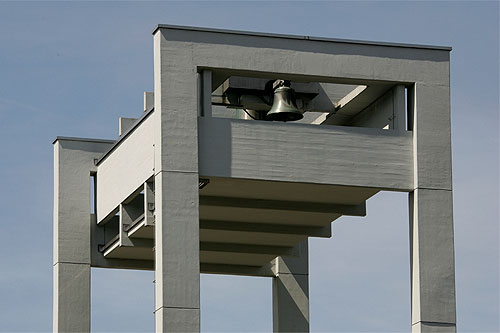
Bell tower of the Saint Paul's Church, a Reformed Church, in Olten

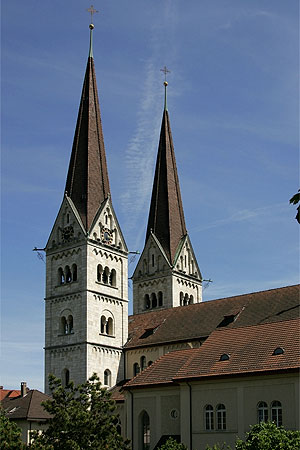
Olten's biggest religious building: the catholic Saint Martin's Church

From the 2000 census, 6,803 or 40.6% were Roman Catholic, while 4,262 or 25.4% belonged to the Swiss Reformed Church. Of the rest of the population, there were 299 members of an Orthodox church (or about 1.78% of the population), there were 390 individuals (or about 2.33% of the population) who belonged to the Christian Catholic Church, and there were 333 individuals (or about 1.99% of the population) who belonged to another Christian church. There were 13 individuals (or about 0.08% of the population) who were Jewish, and 1,363 (or about 8.13% of the population) who were Islamic. There were 82 individuals who were Buddhist, 178 individuals who were Hindu and 18 individuals who belonged to another church. 2,408 (or about 14.37% of the population) belonged to no church, are agnostic or atheist, and 608 individuals (or about 3.63% of the population) did not answer the question.

=== Churches ===
- Saint Martin's Church, Catholic (left side of the river)
- Old Saint Martin (Stadtkirche), Christ Catholic (left side of the river)
- Saint Paul, Protestant (left side of the river)
- Saint Mary (St. Marien) (right side of the river)
- Friedenskirche, Evangelic Protestant Reformist (right side of the river)

== Education ==
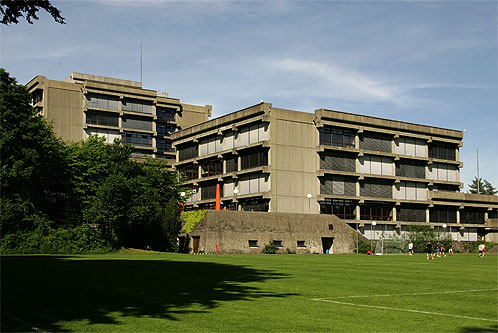
Cantonal School of Olten

In Olten about 6,103 or (36.4%) of the population have completed non-mandatory upper secondary education, and 2,254 or (13.5%) have completed additional higher education (either university or a Fachhochschule). Of the 2,254 who completed tertiary schooling, 60.3% were Swiss men, 23.2% were Swiss women, 10.3% were non-Swiss men and 6.2% were non-Swiss women.

During the 2010–2011 school year there were a total of 1,549 students in the Olten school system. The education system in the Canton of Solothurn allows young children to attend two years of non-obligatory Kindergarten. During that school year, there were 254 children in kindergarten. The canton's school system requires students to attend six years of primary school, with some of the children attending smaller, specialized classes. In the municipality there were 767 students in primary school and 74 students in the special, smaller classes. The secondary school program consists of three lower, obligatory years of schooling, followed by three to five years of optional, advanced schools. 454 lower secondary students attend school in Olten.

As of 2000, there were 1,526 students in Olten who came from another municipality, while 183 residents attended schools outside the municipality.

The grammar school "Kantonsschule" or "Kanti", is situated on a hill near the train station with a splendid all-round view of the town and the surrounding Jura hills. Opened in 1974, is one of the foremost Swiss examples of Brutalist architecture. It is home to roughly 1000 students of ages 12–18, most of whom are preparing for the Swiss high school certicifate which gives free access to all Swiss universities except for the medical schools.

The Fachhochschule Nordwestschweiz (polytechnic college of Northwestern Switzerland (applied sciences)) has one of its campuses in Olten. Olten is home to 2 libraries, the Stadtbibliothek Olten (municipal library) and the Library of the Fachhochschule Nordwestschweiz, which between them offered 30,014 books and other media in 2010, 25,132 of which were loaned out.

== Sports ==
EHC Olten, hockey team playing in the Swiss League. They play their home games in the 6,500-seat Kleinholz Arena, which they regularly fill.

SC Altstadt Olten plays in the Second Regio League, the fifth tier of the Swiss ice hockey league system. The team also plays its home games in the Kleinholz Arena.

== Notable people ==
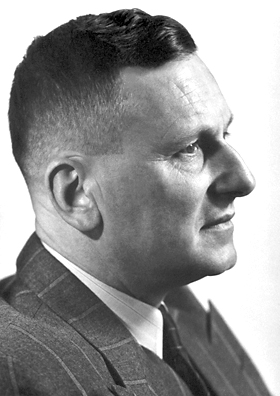
Paul Hermann Müller

- Martin Disteli (1802–1844), painter of caricatures
- Bernhard Hammer (1822–1907), politician, President of the Confederation in 1879 and 1889
- Werner Munzinger (1832–1875), administrator and explorer
- Walter Lienhard (1890–1973), sport shooter
- Paul Hermann Müller (1899–1965), chemist
- Bruno Heim (1911–2003) the Vatican's first Apostolic Nuncio to Britain
- Robert Heuberger (1922–2021), real estate entrepreneur, patron and author
- Lilian Uchtenhagen, (1928–2016), politician and economist
- Ueli Schibler (born 1947), biologist, chronobiologist and academic
- Pedro Lenz (born 1965), writer
- Ramon Vega (born 1971), footballer
- Min Li Marti (born 1974), politician, publisher, sociologist and historian
- Marianne Schmid Mast (born c. 1975) psychologist and academic
- Naomy (born 1977), Romanian recording artist, songwriter and actress
- Gökhan Inler (born 1984), footballer
- Denis Malgin (born 1997), ice hockey player
- Lian Bichsel (born 2004), ice hockey player
