= Christian literature =

Literary genre

Christian literature is the literary aspect of Christian media, and it constitutes a huge body of extremely varied writing.

== History ==
The Christian genre spans a variety of media and art forms that highlight Christian beliefs, narratives, and moral teachings. At its core are the lessons of Jesus Christ, the gospel, and the mission of the Great Commission. Common themes include virtues like love, faith, forgiveness, and hope, as well as the idea of resurrection. Stories often center on the struggle between good and evil, showcasing personal transformation and salvation.

Christianity has long influenced artistic expression, with Christian art and architecture thriving during the medieval and Renaissance eras under church sponsorship. The historical link between patrons and artists reflects the faithful’s bond with God, seen in the tradition of patron saints.

The rise of mass media transformed the spread of Christian works, notably with the printing press. The Gutenberg Bible, produced in the 1450s, was a pioneering printed book in Europe and a landmark in publishing history. The Christian Bible is widely regarded as the best-selling book ever, with billions of copies circulated globally.

Key works in this genre include John Bunyan’s The Pilgrim’s Progress (1678), an allegory of a Christian’s path to salvation. It inspired later writers like C.S. Lewis, whose The Chronicles of Narnia echoes its themes, and has been likened to J.K. Rowling’s Harry Potter series. Vincent van Gogh drew inspiration from Bunyan’s tale, while classics like Dante’s Divine Comedy and John Milton’s Paradise Lost appear in the stained glass of Princeton University Chapel.

== Scripture ==
While falling within the strict definition of literature, the Bible is not generally considered literature. However, the Bible has been treated and appreciated as literature; the King James Version in particular has long been considered a masterpiece of English prose, whatever may be thought of its religious significance. Several retellings of the Bible, or parts of the Bible, have also been made with the aim of emphasising its literary qualities.

== Christian devotional literature ==
Devotionals are often used by Christians in order to help themselves grow closer in their relationship with God and learn how to put their faith into practice.

== Christian non-fiction ==
Letters, theological treatises and other instructive and devotional works have been produced by Christian authors since the times of Jesus. For early Christian times almost all writing would be non-fiction, including letters, biblical commentaries, doctrinal works and hagiography. See Patristics.

Since the invention of the printing press non-fictional literature has been used for the dissemination of the Christian message, and also for disseminating different viewpoints within Christianity. The tract (a small pamphlet containing an explanation of some point, or an appeal to the reader) was in use at the time of the Reformation and continues to be used as a part of proselytization.

== Christian allegory ==
Allegory is a style of literature having the form of a story, but using symbolic figures, actions, or representations to express truths—Christian truths, in the case of Christian allegory. Beginning with the parables of Jesus, there has been a long tradition of Christian allegory, including Dante Alighieri's Divine Comedy, John Bunyan's The Pilgrim's Progress, and Hannah Hurnard's Hinds' Feet on High Places.

== Christian fiction ==
Christian fiction is sometimes harder to define than Christian non-fiction. Christian themes are not always explicit. Some Christian fiction, such as that of C. S. Lewis, draws on the allegorical writings of the past. There can also be argument as to whether the works of a Christian author are necessarily Christian fiction. For example, while there are undoubted Christian themes within J. R. R. Tolkien's The Lord of the Rings, they are always kept below the surface. Other possible examples of Christian fiction include the works of G. K. Chesterton and George Macdonald.

In the last few decades the existence of a Christian subculture, particularly in North America, has given rise to a specific genre of Christian novel, written by and for Christians of a particular type (i.e., conservative Evangelical Protestants), and generally with explicit Christian themes. Unlike the works of C.S. Lewis and J.R.R. Tolkien, such novels are often marketed exclusively to Christians and sold in Christian bookshops. The Christy Awards honour excellence in this genre.

In the late 20th century, with the rise of the Christian Right in American society, Christian-themed fiction has thrived. Examples include the works of Tim LaHaye, Jerry B. Jenkins, Frank Peretti, Ted Dekker, Tosca Lee, Randy Alcorn, Francine Rivers, Wayne Thomas Batson, and Janette Oke.

Within the field of Christian fiction smaller niche markets have emerged aimed at specific denominations, notably Catholic fiction and Latter Day Saints Fiction. There are also Christian fiction that is aimed at wider mainstream audiences, such as the bestselling Left Behind series.

== Christian theatre ==
Throughout the medieval period churches in Europe frequently performed mystery plays, retelling the stories of the Bible. These became widespread in Europe by the end of the fifteenth century. During the fifteenth and sixteenth centuries these developed into the Morality play, an allegorical play intended to exhort the audience to the virtuous life.

In the sixteenth and seventeenth centuries theatre was generally seen as wicked, and the church made attempts to suppress it. In the twentieth century churches, particularly evangelical churches, rediscovered the use of theatre as a form of outreach and as a valid art form.

== Christianity & Literature ==
Christianity & Literature is a peer-reviewed literary periodical, published quarterly, on literature's encounters with Christian thought and history. The journal presupposes no particular theological orientation but respects an orthodox understanding of Christianity as a historically defined faith. It is published by Sage and currently is edited by Mark Eaton, Matthew Smith, and Caleb Spencer, faculty at Azusa Pacific University.

== Notable works ==
Philosophy, plays, lyrical poetry, biography, narrative writings, novels included, most of the theological and hagiographical works are not included.

- Bible (c. 1400 BC–AD 100) – numerous authors
- The Book of Job in the Bible (c. 1500–1000 BC) – unknown author
- Psalms in the Bible, hymns, poems (c. 1000 BC) – David
- Life of St. Anthony English translation from Greek (c. 360) – Athanasius of Alexandria
- The Life of Paulus the First Hermit English translation from Latin (c. 374–375) – St. Jerome
- The Life of St. Hilarion English translation from Latin (c. 390) – St. Jerome
- The Life of Malchus, the Captive Monk English translation from Latin (c. 391) – St. Jerome
- Liber Peristephanon (c. 406) – Prudentius
- Psychomachia (c. 406) – Prudentius
- The Confessions of St. Augustine (397–398 AD) – Augustine of Hippo
- City of God (412) – Augustine of Hippo
- The Easter Song English translation from Latin, first epic of Christendom (c. 450) – Coelius Sedulius
- De spiritualis historiae gestis English translation from Latin (c. 510) – Avitus of Vienne
- The Life of Charlemagne English translation from Latin (c. 825) – Einhard
- Life of St Francis of Assisi English translation from Latin (c. 1260) – Bonaventure
- Golden Legend English translation from Latin (c. 1260) – Jacobus de Voragine
- Summa Theologica (1274) – Thomas Aquinas
- The Divine Comedy (1308–1321) – Dante Alighieri
- My Secret Book Imaginary dialogue with St Augustine (1343) – Petrarch
- Imitation of Christ (1418) – Thomas à Kempis
- Le Morte d'Arthur (1485) – Thomas Malory
- Christiad (1535) epic – Marco Girolamo Vida
- Institutes of the Christian Religion (1536) – John Calvin
- The City of the Sun utopian work (1602) – Tommaso Campanella
- Lucifer (1654) – Joost van den Vondel
- Paradise Lost (1667) – John Milton
- Paradise Regained (1671) – John Milton
- The Pilgrim's Progress (1678) – John Bunyan
- The Lives of the Fathers, Martyrs and Other Principal Saints (hagiography) (1756) – Alban Butler
- The Messiah (1748-1773) – Friedrich Gottlieb Klopstock
- Faust (1808) – Johann Wolfgang Goethe
- The Christian Faith (1820) – Friedrich Schleiermacher
- Cain (1821) – Lord Byron
- Heaven and Earth (1821) – Lord Byron
- A Christmas Carol (1843) – Charles Dickens
- Christiad (epic poem) (1847) – William Alexander
- The Tragedy of Man (1860) (play) – Imre Madách
- Moses (1861) (play) – Imre Madách
- At the Back of the North Wind (1871) – George MacDonald
- The Temptation of Saint Anthony (Flaubert) (1874) – Gustave Flaubert
- Daily Light on the Daily Path (c.1875) – published by Bagster & Sons
- Ben-Hur: A Tale of the Christ (1880) – Lew Wallace
- The Brothers Karamazov (1880) – Fyodor Dostoyevsky
- Quo Vadis (1895) (novel) – Henryk Sienkiewicz
- In His Steps (1896) – Charles Monroe Sheldon
- Orthodoxy (1908) – G. K. Chesterton
- The Great Controversy (1911) – Ellen G.White
- Saint Francis of Assisi (1923) – G. K. Chesterton
- Joseph and His Brothers (1933–1943) – Thomas Mann
- The Screwtape Letters (1942) – C. S. Lewis
- The Robe (1942) – Lloyd C. Douglas
- The Great Divorce (1945) – C. S. Lewis
- Doctor Faustus (1947) – Thomas Mann
- The Chronicles of Narnia (1950-1956) – C. S. Lewis
- The Holy Sinner (Der Erwählte) (1951) – Thomas Mann
- An Angel Comes to Babylon (play) (1953) – Friedrich Dürrenmatt
- Christ Recrucified (The Greek Passion) (1954) – Nikos Kazantzakis
- Hinds' Feet on High Places (1955) – Hannah Hurnard
- The Last Temptation of Christ (1955) (novel) – Nikos Kazantzakis
- Saint Francis (1956) (novel) – Nikos Kazantzakis
- The Agony and the Ecstasy (1961) – Irving Stone
- The Cross and the Switchblade (1962) – David Wilkerson
- The Gold Coffin (1964) – Ferenc Móra
- The Master and Margarita (1967) – Mikhail Bulgakov
- The God Who Is There – Francis Schaeffer
- A Christian Manifesto (1981) – Francis Schaeffer
- How Now Shall We Live (1999) – Charles Colson
- The sixth tailbone of the Cenozoic era (2024) -Seung Moo Ha

== See also ==
- American Catholic literature
- Christian Latin literature
- Christian Classics Ethereal Library
- Evangelical Christian Publishers Association
- Evangelical Press Association
- Mennonite literature
- Mormon fiction
- Reformation era literature
