= English Hexapla =

Parallel New Testament translations

The English Hexapla
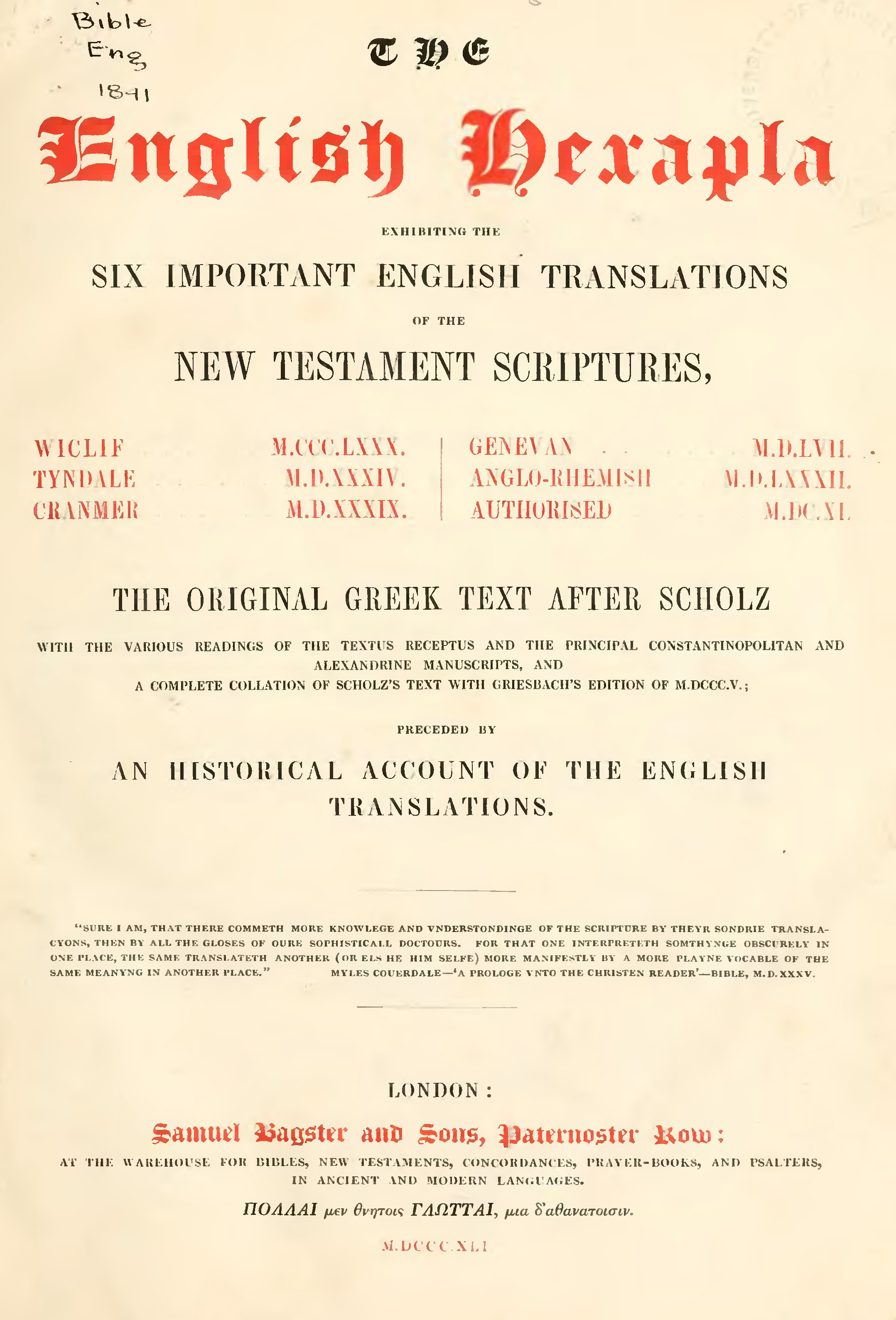
- Title page of The English Hexapla
- Language: Six English translations with the Greek original
- Genre: Parallel Bible
- Published: Bagster & Sons
- Publication date: 1841

The English Hexapla is an 1841 publication of the New Testament in Greek, along with what were considered the six most important English language translations in parallel columns underneath, preceded by a detailed history of English translations and translators written by biblical scholar Samuel Prideaux Tregelles. The six English language translations provided are Wycliffe's (1380), Tyndale's (1534), Cranmer's Great Bible (1539), the Geneva Bible (1557), the Douay-Rheims (1582), and the Authorized version, or King James Bible (1611), arranged in columns underneath.

The term "hexapla" signifies "six-fold" or "six-columned", and describes the arrangement of the six English versions underneath the Greek text in the book. The term "hexapla" is also applied to Origen's 3rd-century edition of the Old Testament, which present six versions of the Old Testament, in Hebrew, Hebrew in Greek letters, Aquila of Sinope's Greek version, Symmachus the Ebionite's version, the LXX or Septuagint, and Theodotion's version.

== History ==
The English Hexapla was published in 1841 by Samuel Bagster the Elder's printing company Bagster & Sons, of Paternoster Row, London, well known for its bible printing. They are described on the title page as being a "warehouse for Bibles, New Testaments, Prayer-books, Lexicons, Grammars, Concordances, and Psalters, in ancient and modern languages."

Original editions of the 1841 printing are rare collector items, and commonly sell for thousands of dollars as of 2026.

Modern facsimile reproductions of the English Hexapla have been produced.

== Greek text ==
The Greek text used is that of Johann Martin Augustin Scholz, compiled between 1830 and 1836, but is itself based largely on the work of Johann Jakob Griesbach, who published several editions of the Greek New Testament between 1775 and 1805.

== Translation texts ==
The following 6 translations are in the English Hexapla:

1. Wycliffe's Bible (Middle English translations from 1382 to 1395 based on Wycliffe's work c. 1380)
2. Tyndale's Bible (1526 with revisions in 1534 and 1536)
3. Great Bible (1539)
4. Geneva Bible (1557)
5. Douay–Rheims Bible (1582)
6. Authorized King James Version (1611)

The edition of Wycliffe's Bible is based on a manuscript belonging to the Duke of Sussex, Prince Augustus Frederick.

The edition of William Tyndale's translation is one revised and published by Tyndale himself in 1534, provided by the Baptist College in Bristol.

Thomas Cranmer's Bible, better known as the Great Bible, contains a preface written by Cranmer for the second edition in 1540. The version in the English Hexapla is reprinted from a first edition of the Great Bible published in 1539, also provided by the Baptist College in Bristol.

The Geneva New Testament is reprinted from a first edition published in 1557.

The Douay-Rheims edition, sometimes referred to as the "Anglo-Rhemish" translation, is reprinted from the original edition of 1582. This is a Roman Catholic translation from the Latin Vulgate, first published at the English College's temporary home at Rheims in that year.

The Authorized version, now commonly known as the King James Version, is from a blackletter or gothic script copy from the year 1611, provided by Reverend John Henry Montagu Luxmoore. The Authorized version underwent some revision in 1762 and 1769, with current Authorized versions being the 1769 Oxford University edition virtually unchanged. Accordingly, the text of the Authorized version in the English Hexapla will show some changes in spelling, punctuation and typesetting, with a very few changes of words, over the modern editions of the Authorized versions now available.

== See also ==
- Early Modern English Bible translations
