= William Maldon =

16th-century English Protestant activist

William Maldon was a 16th-century English Protestant activist who taught himself to read in order to directly access the Bible in English. An autobiographical account on Maldon's self-taught literacy and his father's subsequent violent reaction, "A young man inhumanly persecuted by his Father for reading ye scripture, in K. Henries time", appeared in the Actes and Monuments (also known as Foxe's Book of Martyrs) by John Foxe.

== Biography ==
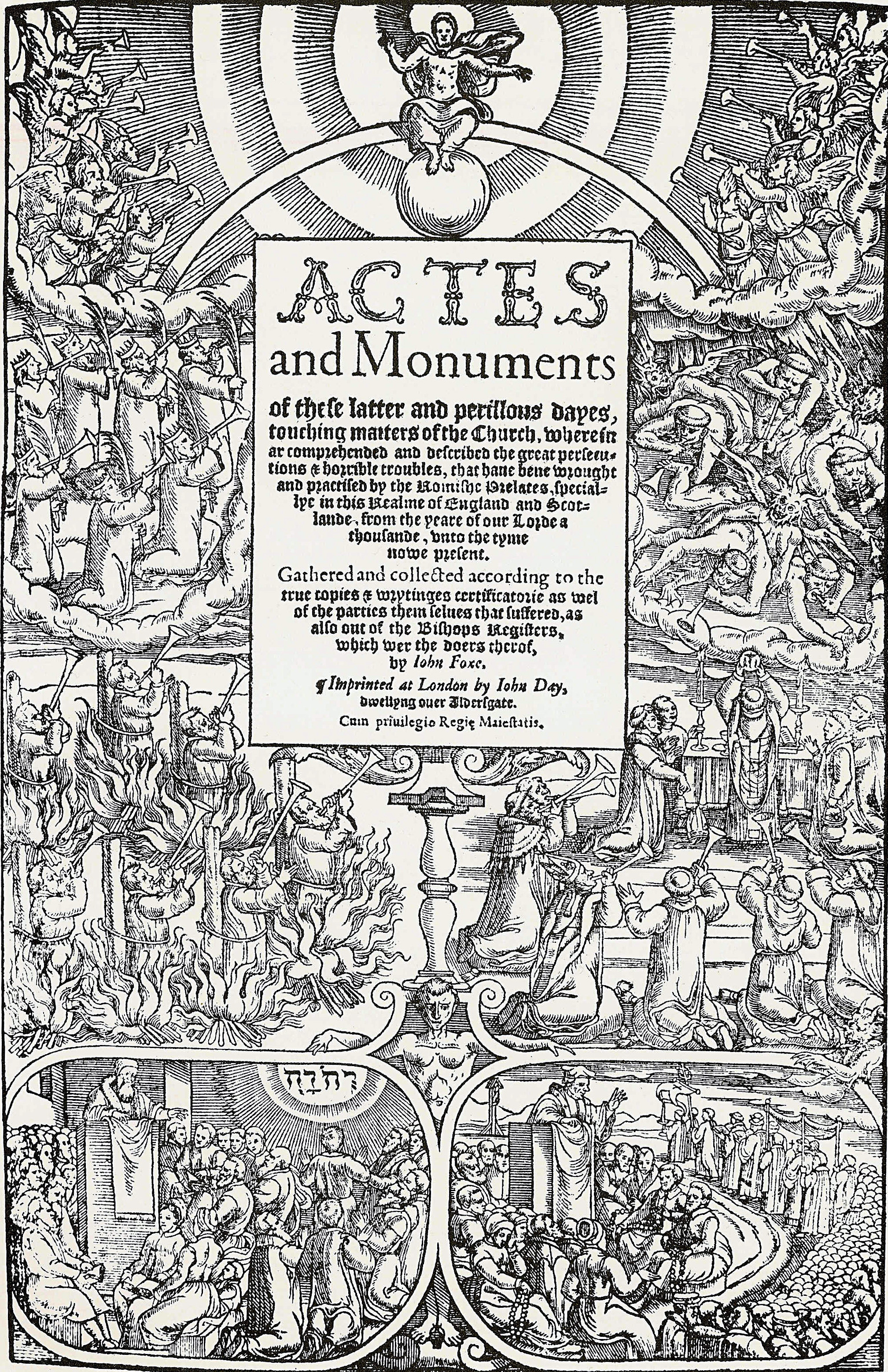
Foxe's Book of Martyrs (title page pictured) features Maldon's account

William Maldon was born in Chelmsford and lived in England during the reign of Henry VIII. Maldon, like many other Englishmen of the early 16th century, was illiterate. This was also a period in which the Bible was translated into English. One popular English edition of the Bible was the Tyndale Bible. Thomas More remarked that many illiterate persons were teaching themselves how to read English using William Tyndale's translation. Maldon was to be among these, and he would later publish an account regarding the conflict between those who desired access to a vernacular Bible and those opposed.

According to his later testimony, while Maldon was growing up and prior to his learning to read, he would watch "poor men" preach on the New Testament. Maldon said that he would listen to these preachers every Sunday until he was taken away from them by his father, who would then take Maldon to attend Matins in Latin. After reading the Bible in English, Maldon confronted his mother and accused her of worshipping graven images, resulting in his father beating and whipping him. According to Maldon's account, he was saved by his mother and brother from his father's attempt to hang Maldon.

Maldon's account, "A young man inhumanly persecuted by his Father for reading ye scripture, in K. Henries time", was published in John Foxe's late 16th-century Actes and Monuments (also known as Foxe's Book of Martyrs). In Foxe's book, the text is endorsed as "receaued of Mr. W. Maldon of Newyngton. With some misgivings this ingenuous document is printed exactly as it stands." The prefacing paragraph to Maldon's writing is of particular note, indicating that Foxe solicited material for his book. Tyndale historian David Daniell described Maldon's story as indicative that "the English Bible was made in blood."
