= Samuel Bagster =

Samuel Bagster may refer to:

- Samuel Bagster the Elder (1772–1851), English publisher
- Samuel Bagster the Younger (1800–1835), English printer and author
  - Bagster & Sons, the publishing house they founded
