= Early Modern English Bible translations =

English bible translations made between about 1500 and 1800

Early Modern English Bible translations are those translations of the Bible which were made between about 1500 and 1800, the period of Early Modern English. This was the first major period of Bible translation into the English language, including the King James Version and Douai Bibles. The Reformation and Counter-Reformation led to the need for Bibles in the vernacular with competing groups each producing their own versions.

Although Wycliffe's Bible had preceded the Protestant Reformation, England was actually one of the last countries in Europe to have a printed vernacular Bible. There were several reasons for this. One was that Henry VIII wanted to avoid the propagation of heresies - a concern subsequently justified by the marginal notes printed in Tyndale's New Testament and the Geneva Bible, for example. Another was the Roman Catholic doctrine of Magisterium which describes the Church as the final authority in the interpretation of the Scriptures; in the volatile years of the Reformation, it was not felt that encouraging private Scriptural interpretation, and thereby possible heresy, would be helpful.

Several of the early printed English Bibles were suppressed, at least temporarily. Henry VIII complained about Tyndale's "pestilent glosses", and only tolerated the Coverdale and Matthew Bibles because the publishers carefully omitted any mention of Tyndale's involvement in them. Later, the "authorised" Great Bible of 1539 was suppressed under Mary I because of her Roman Catholic beliefs.

== Process of publication ==
In this period the roles of printer and publisher were not necessarily as now, and the accuracy of the information given on title pages cannot be relied on. The person named as translator might at most be an editor, since all Bible versions depended heavily on Tyndale's and/or Coverdale's work. Printers and others involved in the publication sometimes worked under pseudonyms. Dates and places of publication might also be given incorrectly.

Identification of a particular Bible as belonging to a specific edition is complicated by the flexibility of the whole production process at the time. The text, being set in movable type, could be corrected or changed in the middle of a print run; thus copies of a given edition may differ on some pages. Also, at the binding stage, a title page from one edition might be combined with text from another edition. The exact origins of a Bible can therefore only be determined by detailed examination of the text. Print runs for early Bibles were relatively short by present-day standards; typically perhaps 1000 to 2500 copies.

Editions printed in England required a royal licence. Later the printing of Bibles in England became a monopoly shared between the Oxford University Press, the Cambridge University Press and the "King's Printers". This situation continued into the 20th century, at which time Eyre and Spottiswoode were the King's Printers.

Printers' errors inevitably escaped detection in some editions. Perhaps the most famous faulty edition is the so-called "Wicked Bible", a 1631 printing of the King James version (Herbert #444) in which Exod. 20:14 read: "Thou shalt commit adultery." For this the printer, Robert Barker, was fined heavily. Of the 1000 copies of the "Wicked Bible" only 11 survive.

== Versions ==
The nine versions summarized below are dealt with in separate articles. With the exception of Tyndale's Bible, all are complete Bibles, although usually the New Testament was also issued separately. The Apocrypha were normally included in Bibles of the Reformation period, although sometimes omitted if the book was subsequently re-bound. Psalters and prayer-books were often bound with the Bible.

In addition, there are a number of other translations of individual books. For example, George Joye's Protestant translations of the Psalms (1530), Isaiah (1531), Proverbs (1533), Ecclesiastes (1533), Jeremiah (1534) and Lamentations (1534), all executed in Antwerp, were the first printed English translations of these biblical books.

=== Tyndale's Bible ===
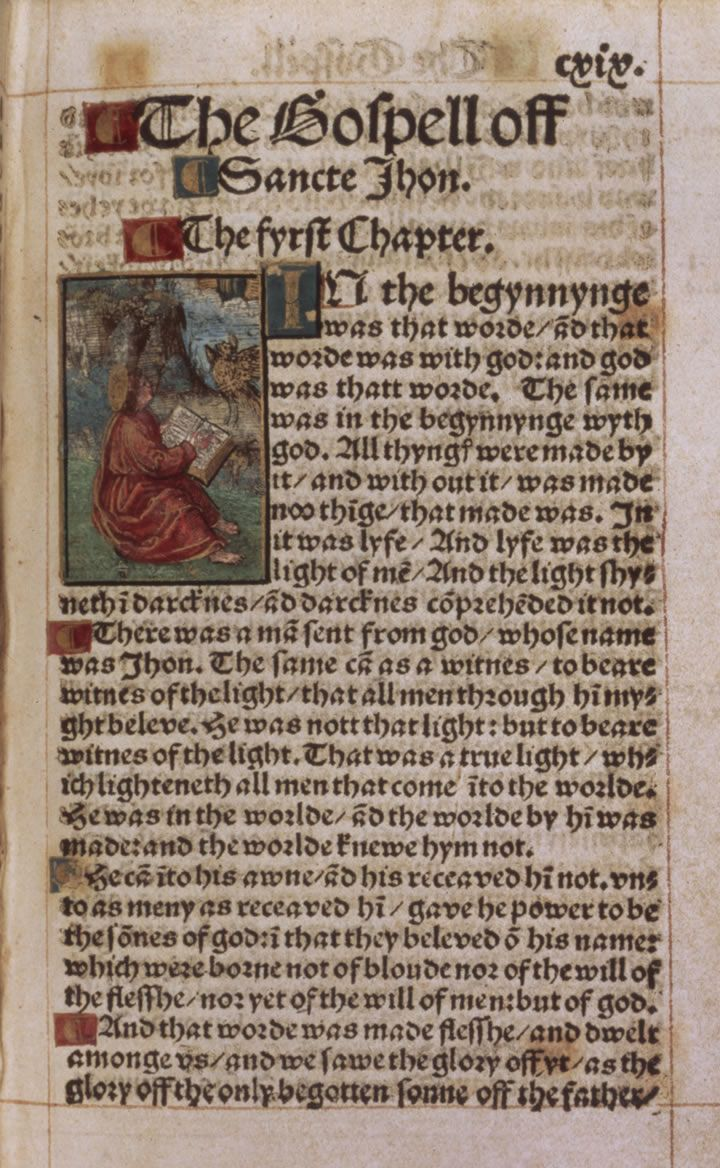
The first page of the Gospel of John, from William Tyndale's 1525 translation of the New Testament

William Tyndale was a scholar who graduated at Oxford, was a student in Cambridge when Martin Luther posted his theses at Wittenberg and was troubled by the problems within the Church. In 1523, taking advantage of the recent invention of the printing press, Tyndale began to cast the Scriptures into English. His aims were simple but ambitious (as expressed to an educated man): "I defy the Pope and all his laws: and if God spare my life, ere many years I will cause a boy that driveth the plough shall know more of the Scriptures than thou dost." Within his lifetime, only his New Testament and part of his Old Testament were published.

He set out to London fully expecting to find support and encouragement there, but he found neither. He found, as he once said, that there was no room in the palace of the Bishop of London to translate the New Testament; indeed, that there was no place to do it in all England. A wealthy London merchant subsidized him with the gift of ten pounds, with which he went across the Channel to Hamburg; and there and elsewhere on the Continent, where he could be hid and where printing facilities were more accessible than in England, he brought his translation to completion. Tyndale was compelled to flee at one time with a few printed sheets and complete his work on another press. Several times copies of his books were solemnly burned, and his own life was frequently in danger; he was eventually executed for his work.

The Church had objected to Tyndale's translations because offensive notes (the "pestilent glosses") and, in their belief, deliberate mistranslations had been included in the works in order to promote anticlericalism and heretical views. It is for this reason that Tyndale's earliest editions were so vigorously suppressed that few copies have survived.

There is one story that tells how money came to free Tyndale from heavy debt and prepare the way for more Bibles. The Bishop of London, Cuthbert Tunstall, was set on destroying copies of the English New Testament. He therefore made a bargain with a merchant of Antwerp, to secure them for him. The merchant was a friend of Tyndale, and went to him to tell him he had a customer for his Bibles, The Bishop of London. Tyndale agreed to give the merchant the Bibles to pay his debt and finance new editions of the Bible.

Ironically, Tyndale's was perhaps the most influential single translation of the Bible ever made into English. Several immediately subsequent publications, among them the Matthews and Great Bibles, relied heavily on Tyndale's wording while softening his radical Protestantism. The original 1611 version of the King James New Testament is reckoned to be nearly 90% unaltered Tyndale. 'A complete analysis of the Authorised Version, known down the generations as the AV or the King James, was made in 1998. It shows that Tyndale's words account for 84 per cent of the New Testament, and for 75.8 per cent of the Old Testament books that he translated.'

=== Coverdale's Bible ===
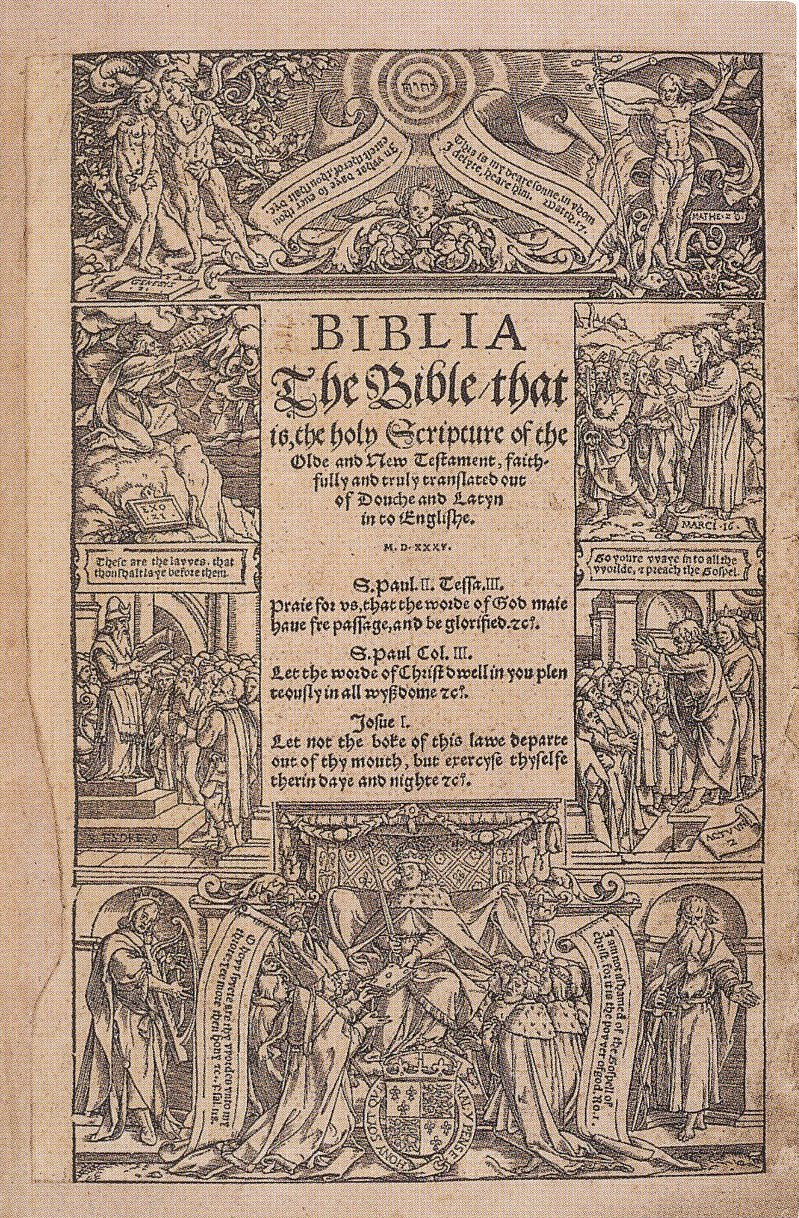
The title page of the Coverdale Bible

The first complete printed translation into English, and the first complete translation into Modern English, was compiled by Myles Coverdale and published in 1535. It was much influenced by Tyndale: Coverdale took Tyndale's New Testament and the published portions of his Old Testament, and translated the remainder of the Old Testament himself from Latin and German versions.

=== Matthew's Bible ===
Matthew's Bible was produced by John Rodgers, working under the pseudonym "Thomas Matthew" for safety, in 1537. It was based on Tyndale's previously published editions with the addition of his unpublished Old Testament material. The remainder used Coverdale's translation. It received the approval of Henry VIII.

=== Taverner's Bible ===
Taverner's Bible is a minor revision of Matthew's Bible edited by Richard Taverner and published in 1539.

=== Great Bible ===
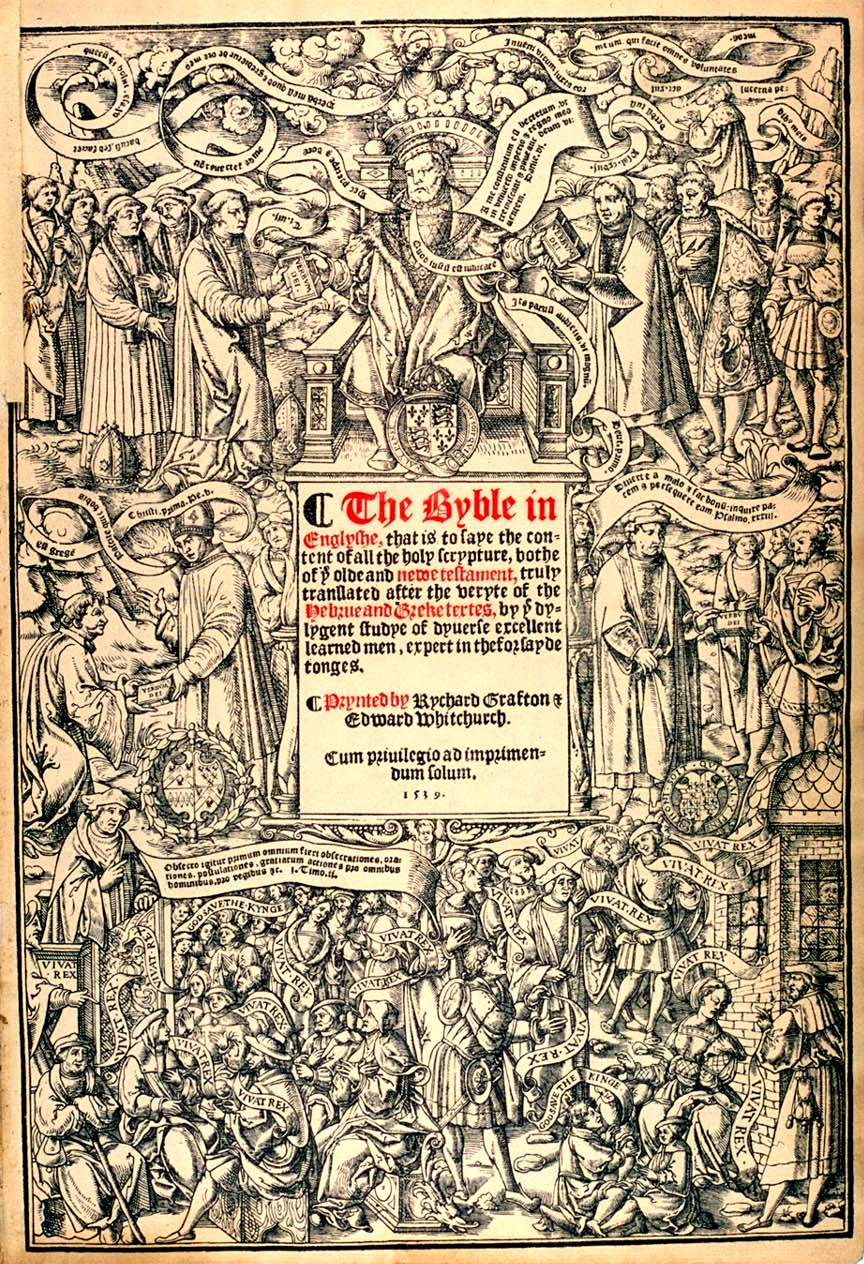
Title page of the Great Bible (1539)

There appeared what is known as the Great Bible in 1539, also compiled by Myles Coverdale. The Great Bible was issued to meet a decree that each church should make available in some convenient place the largest possible copy of the whole Bible, where all the parishioners could have access to it and read it at their will.

The version gets its name from the size of the volume. That decree dates 1538, twelve years after Tyndale's books were burned, and two years after he was burned. The installation of these great books caused tremendous excitement as crowds gathered everywhere. Bishop Bonner had six copies of the great volume located throughout St. Paul's. The Great Bible appeared in seven editions in two years, and continued in recognized power for thirty years. Much of the present English prayer-book is taken from it.

But this liberty was so sudden that the people naturally abused it. King Henry VIII became vexed because the sacred words "were disputed, rimed, sung, and jangled in every ale-house". King Henry began to put restrictions on the use of the Bible. There were to be no notes or annotations in any versions, and those that existed were to be blacked out. Only the upper classes were to be allowed to possess a Bible. Finally, the year before his death, all versions were again prohibited except the Great Bible, whose cost and size precluded personal use. The decree led to another great burning of Bibles in 1546—Tyndale, Coverdale, Matthew—all but the Great Bible. The leading religious reformers took flight and fled to European Protestant towns like Frankfurt and Strassburg.

Under Edward VI, the regency cast off all restrictions on translation and publication of the Bible; all the suppressed versions were republished. The order for a Great Bible in every church was renewed, and there was to be added to it a copy of Erasmus' paraphrase of the four gospels, in an English translation undertaken in part by Princess Mary, the King's Catholic sister. Nearly fifty editions of the Bible, in whole or in part, appeared in those six years. When Mary herself succeeded to the throne in 1553, she maintained her brother's policy of encouraging public reading of the Great Bible and Paraphrases; but versions with overtly Protestant notes were once again liable to be burned.

=== Geneva Bible ===
Queen Mary I temporarily restored the Church of England to allegiance to Rome. The secret use of Reformed translations of the Bible began again, despite official efforts to restore England to Roman Catholic unity. The only Bible translation published during Mary's reign was the Whittingham New Testament of 1557 printed in Geneva (Herbert #106). English scholarship was driven into exile, and found its way to Frankfurt and Geneva again. There the spirit of scholarship was untrammeled. They found material for scholarly study of the Bible, and there they made and published a new version of the Bible in English, the Geneva Bible. During Elizabeth's reign sixty editions of it appeared.

The Geneva Bible was first published in 1560 (Herbert #107). It made several changes: for one, the Geneva edition was the first to show the division into verses. The chapter division was made three centuries earlier, but the verses belong to the Genevan version, and are meant to make the book suitable for responsive use and for reader reference. They were taken in large part from the work of Stephanus (Robert Estienne of Paris), who had divided the Greek Testament into verses in 1551, during a journey which he was compelled to make between Paris and Lyon.

The Geneva version was printed both in Roman type and in the older typeface, black letter. It had full "notes on hard passages", some of which eventually proved controversial to King James and were thus a prompt to a new translation; the King James version. The work itself was completed after the accession of Elizabeth, when most of the religious leaders had returned to England from their exile under Mary.

The Geneva Bible was compiled by William Whittingham, who had succeeded John Knox as pastor of the English congregation at Geneva, Switzerland. Whittingham was married to John Calvin's sister and the translation was viewed as too Calvinist by the Church of England.

=== Bishops' Bible ===
During the reign of Elizabeth I it was found that two versions of the Bible were in common use, the old Great Bible and the new Geneva Bible. There could be no way of gaining approval for the Geneva Bible. For one thing, John Knox had been a party to its preparation; so had Calvin. The Queen and many of the bishops detested them both, especially Knox. For another thing, its notes were not favorable to royal sovereignty. Finally, it had been made in a foreign land and was under suspicion on that account.

The result was that Elizabeth's Archbishop of Canterbury, Matthew Parker, set out to have another official version made. He selected a revision committee, with instructions to follow closely wherever possible the Great Bible, to avoid contentious notes and to make such a version that it might be freely, easily and naturally read. The result is known as the Bishops' Bible. It was issued in Elizabeth's tenth year (1568), but there is no record that she ever noticed it, though Parker sent her a copy from his sick-bed. Its publication (as a complete Bible) ceased before the first issue of the new official (though not formally "authorized") version, the King James Version of 1611.

=== Douay–Rheims Version ===
New Testament title page of the 1582 Douay–Rheims Bible

The Douai (or Douay) version was the work of English Roman Catholic scholars connected with the University of Douai in France. The New Testament was issued at Rheims in 1582, and the Old Testament in two volumes, in 1609 and 1610, just before the King James version. It is made, not from the Hebrew and the Greek, though it refers to both, but from the Latin Vulgate. The result is that the Old Testament of the Douai version is a translation into English from the Latin, which in turn is, mostly, a translation from the Hebrew. Yet scholars are scholars, and it shows some influence of the Genevan version; and, indeed, of other English versions, especially that of Myles Coverdale. Its notes were strongly anti-Protestant, and in its preface it explains its existence by saying that Protestants have been guilty of "casting the holy to dogs and pearls to hogs."

The version's English was not colloquial, but ecclesiastical and highly latinate. In Hebrews 13:17, the version reads, "Obey your prelates and be subject unto them." In Luke 3:3, John came "preaching the baptism of penance." In Psalm xxiii:5, where the King James Version reads, "My cup runneth over", the Douai version, taking its cue from the Greek Septuagint, reads, "My chalice which inebriateth me, how goodly it is." There is a retention of ecclesiastical terms, and an explanation of the passages on which Protestants tended to differ rather sharply from Roman Catholics, as in the matter of the taking of the cup by the people, and elsewhere. In 1589, the Protestant scholar William Fulke issued a point by point refutation of the notes of the Rheims New Testament, in which he also printed the biblical text both of Rheims and of the Bishop's Bible in parallel columns. This work, which sold very widely, had the consequence of making the Rheims New Testament much more accessible than would otherwise have been the case.

The Douai translation was updated in 1750 by Bishop Challoner and while it continued to be known as the Douai version, many consider it to be equivalent to a separate translation. In various updates, this version remained the standard Catholic English-language Bible until 1941.

=== King James Version ===
The King James Version (KJV), or Authorized Version is an English translation of the Holy Bible, commissioned for the Church of England at the behest of King James I. First published in 1611, it has had a profound impact not only on most English translations that have followed it, but also on English literature as a whole.

The King James Version was first published in 1611 as a complete Bible (Herbert #309) and a New Testament (Herbert #310). Translated by 47 translators using the widest range of source texts, it became known as the "Authorised Version" in England and is the most widely used of the Early Modern English Bible translations. Its use has continued in some traditions up to the present. Even though modern scholarship continues to claim problems with some of the translation, it is widely admired for its style and use of language.

The edition of the King James Bible found in modern printings is not that of the 1611 edition, but rather an edition extensively modernised in 1769 (to the standards of the mid-18th Century) by Benjamin Blayney for the Oxford University Press.

A sample of the King James – as updated by Blayney – shows the similarity to modern English:

Our Father which art in heaven, Hallowed be thy name. Thy kingdom come. Thy will be done in earth, as it is in heaven. Give us this day our daily bread. And forgive us our debts, as we forgive our debtors. And lead us not into temptation, but deliver us from evil: For thine is the kingdom, and the power, and the glory, for ever. Amen.

— Matthew 6:9-13
