= Bagster =

Bagster may refer to:

- Samuel Bagster (disambiguation), several people
- Josiah Howell Bagster (1847–1893) South Australian politician
- Dr. George Bagster Phillips (1835–1897) Police Surgeon involved in Jack the Ripper investigation
- A French manufacturer of motorcycle equipment
