= Daily Light on the Daily Path =

Daily Light on the Daily Path or Daily Light is a Christian daily devotional scripture reading published by Bagster & Sons about 1875. It has been reprinted continually since then. It consists of brief groupings of scripture passages which speak to prominent Biblical themes—two themes (morning and evening) for each day of the year. It appends no commentary, but simply allows scripture to speak for itself.

Jonathan Bagster, the son of Samuel Bagster, created the work for his own family's daily devotion. Jonathan's son, Robert, published the devotional some years later with assistance from his daughter Ann.
