= John Galpine =

British botanist

John Galpine (1771 – 6 January 1806) was a British nurseryman and botanical writer.

Galpine was born at Blandford Forum, Dorset. He was elected an associate of the Linnean Society on 20 February 1798. He published Synoptical Compend of the British Flora, a translation of Sir James Edward Smith's Compendium florae Britannicae (1800): Galpine's preface was dated at Blandford, 1 January 1806, but he died on 6 January. After his death three enlarged editions of the work were printed by a London bookseller, dated respectively 1819, 1829, 1834.
