= Samuel Bagster the Younger =

British printer

Samuel Bagster the Younger (1800–1835) was an English printer and author.

Bagster was the eldest son of Samuel Bagster (1772–1851). He was born on 19 October 1800, and, after having been educated at a school at Oxford, conducted by the Rev. James Hinton, was articled to his father in 1815. From an early age on he showed a serious tendency, and in October 1822 joined the Baptist church in Blackfriars. Having acquired the necessary technical training in his father's establishment, young Bagster commenced business for himself in 1824 as a printer in Bartholomew Close.

He married Miss Elizabeth Hunt in June 1825. Samuel was well read in the natural history of bees, and during the summer of 1834 his popular book 'The Management of Bees' was published. Printed by himself and published jointly by his father and his father's business partner William Pickering, it was an attempt to distil the vast literature on bees, describing the work of his predecessor apiarists such as Francis Huber, and contemporaries such as Thomas Nutt. It sold well, and passed through two further editions published posthumously in 1838 and 1865.

The greater part of these reflections were reprinted by Bagster in a volume produced in the same style and at the same time as his own practical handbook. He contributed 'The Treasury of Scripture Knowledge' to his father's polyglot series. He projected a series of questions on the gospels for Sunday-school children, but the manuscript of the latter remained unfinished and unpublished. Although at first the progress of his business gave him cause for anxiety, it steadily increased in extent. Many of the polyglot bibles and other learned publications of Messrs. Bagster & Sons came from his press. His amiable and devout disposition is dwelt upon by his biographer, the Rev. John Broad, a Baptist minister, who reported that the subject of Bagster's memoir took an active part in the anti-slavery and temperance movements. For the latter cause he wrote several pamphlets. Shepherd's Bush, where he spent the last part of his life, was then a rural neighbourhood, and Bagster occupied some of his leisure in poultry-breeding and bee-keeping.

Though still a young man, ill health led to Samuel retiring from business well before his father, though he remained active in antislavery and temperance. He died at his residence, Aldine Cottage, on 1 July 1835, aged 34 years, leaving no children. He was buried at Tottenham Court Chapel, and his remains were removed in 1843 to the family vault in Abney Park Cemetery. His widow survived until 1879.

== Publications ==
Bagster's works include:

- 'The Treasury of Scripture Knowledge; consisting of a rich and copious assemblage of more than 500,000 scripture references and parallel passages from Canne, Brown, Blayney, Scott, and others, with numerous illustrative notes: adapted to be the companion of every biblical reader', London, Samuel Bagster [1834], foolscap 8vo and 4to, forming the second part of the 'Treasury Bible'.
- 'The Management of Bees, with a description of the "Ladies Safety-hive", with 40 illustrative wood engravings', London, Samuel Bagster, 1834, small 8vo. A second edition was published in 1838, and a third (also unaltered) in 1865.
- 'Spiritual Honey from Natural Hives, or Meditations and Observations on the Natural History and Habits of Bees, first introduced to public notice in 1657 by Samuel Purchas, M.A.', London, S. Bagster, 1834, small 8vo.
