= Samuel Bagster the Elder =

English publisher (1772–1851)

Samuel Bagster the elder (26 December 1772 – 28 March 1851) was the founder of the publishing firm of Bagster & Sons, known for printing Bibles such as the English Hexapla. Bagster's son Samuel Bagster the Younger was also a printer and author.

== Early life ==
Samuel Bagster was born on 26 December 1772, the second son of George and Mary Bagster, of St. Pancras. He was educated at Northampton under Rev. John Ryland, and after serving an apprenticeship with William Otridge, commenced business as a general bookseller on 19 April 1794 in the Strand, where he remained until 1816.

== Printing the Bible ==
=== The idea ===
A few years before he left, the rarity and consequent costliness of all polyglot bibles gave Samuel Bagster the idea of supplying a convenient and inexpensive edition. He first brought out a Hebrew Bible, which was followed by the Septuagint, both in foolscap octavo. The production of English bibles was a monopoly in the United Kingdom, confined in England to the king's printer and the two great universities, in Scotland to Sir D. H. Blair and John Bruce, and in Ireland to Mr. Grierson. It had been decided, however, that the patent did not apply to bibles printed with notes.

=== Bagster's polyglot bible ===
In 1816, Bagster brought out "The English version of the polyglot bible" (with a preface by T. Chevalier), in foolscap octavo size, containing a selection of over 60,000 parallel references, mainly selected and all verified by himself. The book was extremely successful. Every detail in its production was superintended by the publisher, who introduced a new style of binding in the best Turkey Morocco, with flexible tight backs, the sheets being sewed with thin thread or silk. He also used prepared sealskins, which, with their 'pin-head grain', were much admired.

=== Move and other printing ===
In 1816, Bagster moved to 15 Paternoster Row. The first issue of the Biblia Sacra Polyglotta Bagsteriana appeared between 1817 and 1828, four volumes in foolscap octavo and quarto form, containing, besides the prolegomena of Dr. Samuel Lee, the Hebrew Old Testament with points, the Samaritan Pentateuch, the Septuagint Greek version of the Old Testament, the Latin Vulgate, the authorised English version, the Greek Textus Receptus of the New Testament and the Peshito or ancient Syriac version. An edition was printed of a quarto French, Italian, Spanish and German Bible, which was destroyed by fire on the premises in March 1822, when only twenty-three copies of the New Testament portion were preserved. A folio edition of the polyglot was published in 1828, repeated in 1831, and subsequently, presenting eight languages at the opening of the volume, and including all the ancient and modern versions above mentioned. Copies of the different texts and translations were brought out separately and in various combinations. Although best known for publishing religious works, other books were sometimes issued, including 'A Synoptical Compend of British Botany, Arranged After the Linnean System' by John Galpine.

=== Regulation reform ===
In consequence of the arbitrary regulations of the excise authorities, paper could only be had in certain sizes and it was partially owing to Bagster's exertions that the rules were modified. Two other forms of the English bible were issued, and, all of them harmonising page for page, began what is known as the 'Facsimile Series.' The publication of the first volume of the polyglot was followed in 1821 by an octoglot edition of the liturgy of the Church of England in a handsome quarto. The eight languages were English, French, German, Italian, Spanish, ancient Greek, modern Greek and Latin.

=== William Greenfield ===
In 1822, Bagster made the acquaintance of the self-taught Orientalist, William Greenfield, of whose life he wrote an account in the Imperial Magazine (1834, pp. 9, 63). Greenfield had suggested a lexicon to the polyglot edition of the Hebrew Bible, which caused him to be engaged as a proof-reader to the various learned publications Bagster was then bringing out. In 1824, Bagster circulated the prospectus of a polyglot grammar in twenty or thirty languages upon the principles of comparative philology, also the suggestion of Greenfield, who in 1827 edited for the publisher his Comprehensive Bible, with 4,000 illustrative notes, 500,000 marginal references, a general introduction and a variety of other useful information. Bagster's Syriac New Testament (1828–29) Hebrew New Testament (1830), Polymicrian Greek Lexicon (1829), Schmidt's Greek Concordance (1829), and, in fact, all the small and beautifully printed Polymicrian series, were also edited by Greenfield.

=== Later printing ===
Many books were subsequently printed by Bagster. A quarto issued in 1841 is specially deserving of mention. It is the English Hexapla, giving six important versions of the New Testament in English—Wyclif (1380), Tyndale (1534), Cranmer (1539), the Genevan (1557), the Anglo-Rhemish (1582), and the Authorised (1611)—together with the Greek text based on Johann Martin Augustin Scholz's work, and a valuable historical account of the English translations. Another noteworthy publication was the Bible of Every Land, supplying specimens of over 270 different languages and versions.

The Methodist New Connection resolved at its annual Conference in 1865 that a copy of Bagster's Bible, the Conference Journal, the connection's deed poll and the general rules of the society should become the insignia of office of the president, to be handed down in succession.

== Firm motto ==
The well-known motto of the firm, "πολλαὶ μὲν θνητοῖς γλῶτται, μία δ'ἀθανάτοισιν" ("The inhabitants of earth have many tongues, those of heaven have but one"), is said to have been due to the Rev. H. F. Cary. The Bagster family said the Latin version, "multæ terricolis linguæ, cœlestibus una", was composed by William Greenfield. The two versions appear on Greenfield's tomb; according to Henry Richard Tedder in the Dictionary of National Biography, "it is very probable that they were both by him".

== Personal life ==
Bagster married Eunice Birch on 19 December 1797. She survived him by 26 years, dying on the eve of her 99th birthday. He died at his residence in Old Windsor on 28 March 1851, aged 78, and is commemorated with a large ledger slab memorial at Abney Park Cemetery. Eunice is interred with Samuel and their eldest son Samuel Bagster the Younger (1800–1835) who printed many of the firm's publications. Due to the younger Samuel's early death, his brother Jonathan (1813–1872) succeeded the elder Samuel as senior member of the firm.
