= William Alexander (poet) =

American poet and author

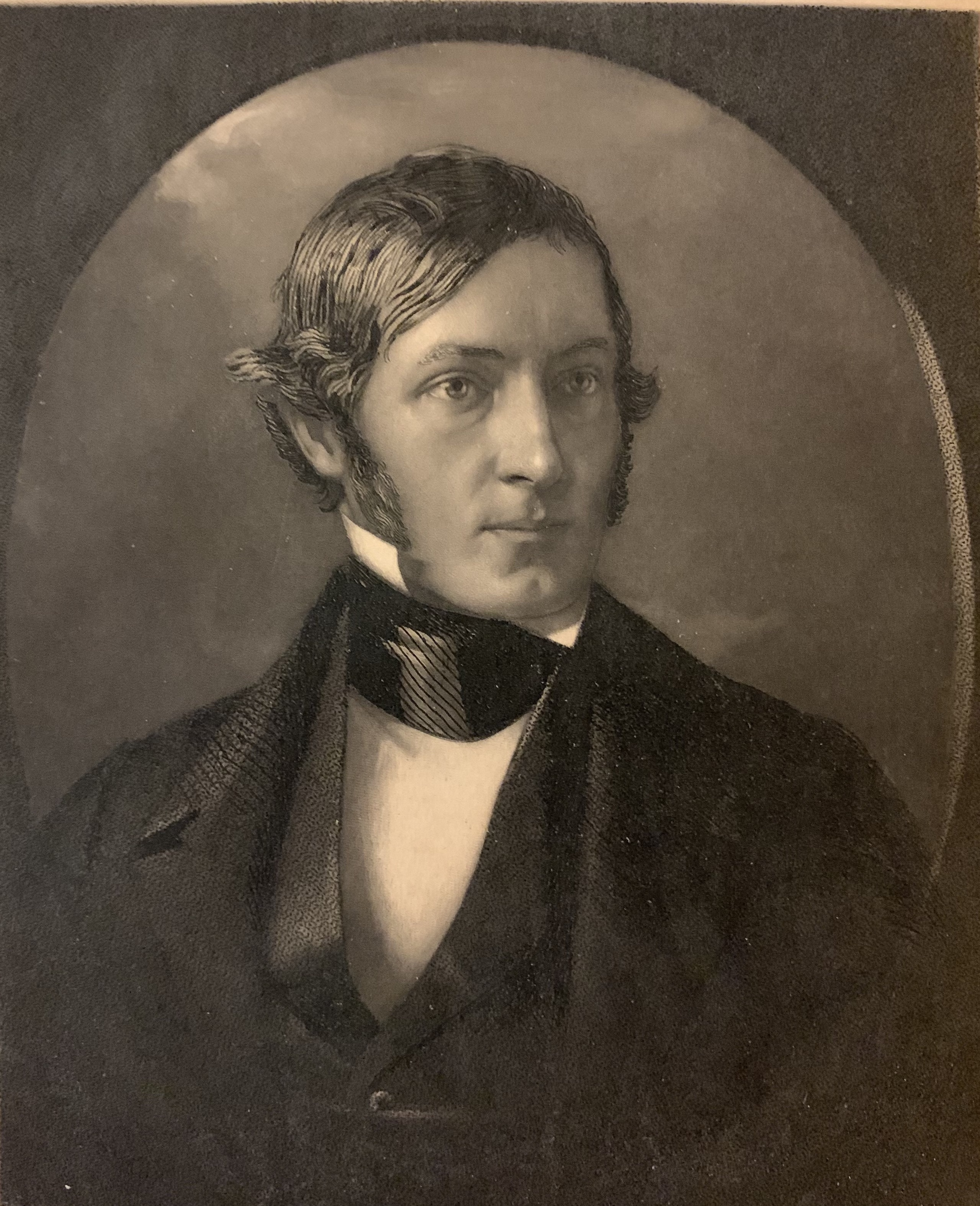
- Born: December 5, 1808
- Occupation: Author
- Writing career
- Genre: Poetry

William Alexander (1808–1875) was an American poet and author.

== Biography ==
William Alexander was born in Philadelphia, Pennsylvania, December 5, 1808, and graduated from the University of Pennsylvania in 1831 with a bachelor of arts degree. After graduation, he became an "usher in the grammar-school of the university." Three years later, Alexander opened an academy "of the classical order," where he remained for six years. Thereafter, he became teacher of Mathematics for two years. Upon leaving this profession, he turned toward private tutoring and writing.

Alexander is best known for his epic poem, The Christiad, and was a contributor to popular literary magazines such as Godey's Lady's Book and Graham's Magazine.

His only published book of poetry, The Poetical Works of William Alexander; Including His Christiad, Dramas, and Minor Poems, with Dissertations on Poetry, and a Sketch of His Life, received mixed reviews. The New York Commercial Advertiser commented, "We acknowledge...to having derived more amusement from the author's autobiography than from his metered lines." The criticism ends by remarking, "The gentleman is no poet, however; he would do wisely to abandon that path and adhere to the more practical justice of a good citizen."
