= American Catholic literature =

American Catholic literature emerged in the early 1900s as its own genre. Catholic literature is not exclusively literature written by Catholic authors or about Catholic things, but rather Catholic literature is "defined [...] by a particular Catholic perspective applied to its subject matter."

== Definition ==
"...Catholic imaginative literature—fiction, poetry, drama, and memoir—not theological, scholarly, or devotional writing. Surprisingly little Catholic imaginative literature is explicitly religious; even less is devotional. Most of it touches on religious themes indirectly while addressing other subjects—not sacred topics but profane ones, such as love, war, family, violence, sex, mortality, money, and power. What makes the writing Catholic is that the treatment of these subjects is permeated with a particular worldview."

Professor Dana Gioia mentions various types of Catholic writers: practicing Catholics, and cultural Catholics, "writers who were raised in the faith and often educated in Catholic schools. Cultural Catholics usually made no dramatic exit from the Church but instead gradually drifted away." There are also writers who have converted to Catholicism. A separate group are "...anti-Catholic Catholics, writers who have broken with the Church but remain obsessed with its failings and injustices, both genuine and imaginary." The latter are not, strictly speaking, "Catholic writers", having rejected traditional Catholic viewpoints and practices.

According to editor Joshua Hren, "Catholic writers tend to see humanity struggling in a fallen world. They combine a longing for grace and redemption with a deep sense of human imperfection and sin. Evil exists, but the physical world is not evil. Nature is sacramental, shimmering with signs of sacred things. Indeed, all reality is mysteriously charged with the invisible presence of God. Catholics perceive suffering as redemptive, at least when borne in emulation of Christ's passion and death."

== History ==
Orestes Brownson converted from Transcendentalism to Catholicism in 1844; his views held much in common with the Liberal Catholicism of Charles de Montalembert, and periodically got him in trouble, sometimes with the Catholic hierarchy. He published Brownson's Quarterly Review, a Catholic journal of opinion, including many reviews of "inspirational novels".

Throughout the 19th century Irish-American novelist commentated on the treatment of Irish immigrant communities. Novels produced throughout the period were often based the continued social prejudices which these communities endured. Works such as Peter McCorry's Mount Benedict, included violence directed at Irish immigrants and the links the violence to the shown in Charleston and the "attempted wreckings in the north of Ireland." which occurred in unison during the 1830s and 1840s.

In the years after the American Civil War, a young priest by the name of Isaac Hecker traveled around giving lectures with the aim of evangelizing both Catholics and non-Catholics alike. In 1865, Fr. Hecker started a periodical, which he named the Catholic World, and in 1867 he founded the Catholic Publication Society to help publish and distribute them on a national level. Brownson wrote a number of articles for the Catholic World.

In 1927, there was a growing curiosity toward the Catholic culture among the faith community. As Catholic literature was more readily accepted, more and more pieces of literature with Catholic themes and subjects were published.

The mid-twentieth century saw a number of Catholic writers prominent in American literature, such as Paul Horgan, Edwin O'Connor, Henry Morton Robinson, Caroline Gordon, and poet Phyllis McGinley. Between 1945 and 1965, Catholic novelists and poets received eleven Pulitzer Prizes and five National Book Awards.

J. F. Powers was an American novelist and short-story writer whose work has long been admired for its gentle satire and its ability to recreate with a few words the insular but gradually changing world of post-World War II American Catholicism. He is known for having captured a "clerical idiom" in postwar North America. His story "The Valiant Woman" received the O. Henry Award in 1947. His first novel was Morte d'Urban (1962), which won the 1963 National Book Award for Fiction. Evelyn Waugh, Walker Percy, and Frank O'Connor admired his work.

== See also ==
- Mary McCarthy
- Flannery O'Connor
