= David Daniell (author) =

British writer (1929–2016)

David John Daniell (17 February 1929 – 1 June 2016) was an English literary scholar who became Professor of English at University College London. He was founder of the Tyndale Society, a specialist in William Tyndale and his translations of the Bible, and author of a number of studies of the plays of Shakespeare.

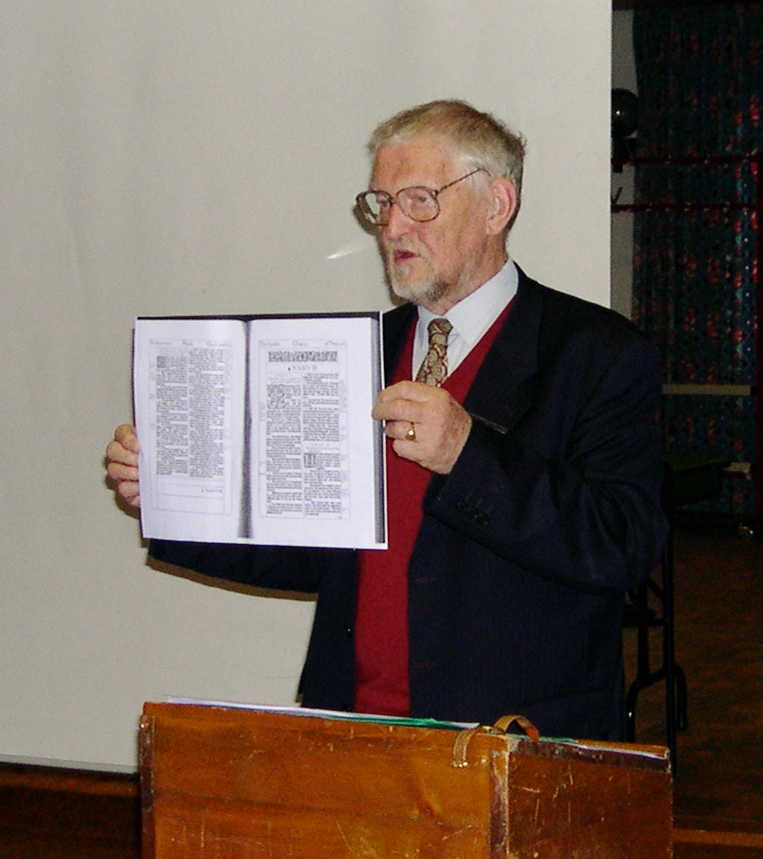
David Daniell

== Life ==
David Daniell was the son of Rev Eric Herbert Daniell (later minister at Grange Road Baptist Church, Darlington, 1941–1946) and his wife Betty, and was nephew to the mathematician Percy John Daniell. He was educated at Queen Elizabeth Grammar School in Darlington followed by St Catherine's College, Oxford, where he read English. He graduated with a Bachelor of Arts degree in 1952 (Master of Arts in 1954). Also in 1954 he was awarded a BA degree in theology. He studied from 1954 to 1955 at the University of Tübingen, receiving a postgraduate degree. In 1972 he received his PhD from the University of London, in Shakespeare studies.

In 1979, Daniell accompanied the Royal Shakespeare Company on a six-week tour of European cities.

In 1980 and 1982 he published two volumes of The Best Short Stories of John Buchan; in 1989, William Tyndale's New Testament, and in 1992 William Tyndale's Old Testament.

In 1994 he published a biography of William Tyndale and the following year (January 1995) became founder and first chairman of the Tyndale Society following a meeting the British Library.

1998 he published the Arden Third Series edition of Shakespeare's Julius Caesar. His book about the history of the English Bible (The Bible in English: History and Influence) appeared in 2003.

Daniell spent twelve years as a Sixth Form Master at Apsley Grammar School before moving to University College London where he was appointed a professor of English. He retired in 1994.

He was an honorary fellow of Hertford College, Oxford and of St Catherine's College, Oxford, and also visiting fellow and honorary member of the Senior Common Room at Magdalen College, Oxford.

== Family ==
Daniell married Dorothy Mary Wells in 1956 and they had two sons. His wife died on 25 November 2010.

== Death ==
The Tyndale Society gives the date of his death as 1 June 2016. A brief notice was also posted by Hertford College, Oxford.

== Selected works and edited books ==
- Daniell, David (1975), The Interpreter's House: A Critical Assessment of the Work of John Buchan, London: Nelson.
- John Buchan (1980), Daniell, David (ed.), The Best Short Stories of John Buchan (with introduction and notes), vol. I, London: Michael Joseph.
- ——— (1982), Daniell, David (ed.), The Best Short Stories of John Buchan (with introduction and notes), vol. II, London: Michael Joseph.
- Daniell, David (1980), 'Coriolanus' in Europe, London: Athlone Press.
- ——— (1989), The "Tempest" (Critics Debate), Basingstoke: Palgrave Macmillan.
- ——— (1994), William Tyndale: a biography, New Haven & London: Yale University Press.
- ——— (2003), The Bible in English: Its History and Influence, New Haven: Yale University Press.
- Daniell, David (interviewee); Noah, William H (producer/researcher/host) (c. 2004), William Tyndale: his life, his legacy (videorecording), Avalon.
- ———; Boulter, Russell (2005), William Tyndale: Man with a Mission (PDF) (videorecording), Christian History Institute.
- Ferrell, Lori Anne (lead researcher); Daniell, David (source author and interviewee) (April 2007), Secrets of the Dead: Battle for the Bible (videorecording), Educational Broadcasting Corporation and Pioneer Productions.
- Shakespeare, William (1998), Daniell, David (ed.), Julius Caesar, The Arden Shakespeare, Walton-on-Thames: Thomas Nelson & Sons.
- Tyndale, William (1989), Daniell, David (ed.), Tyndale's New Testament: Translated from the Greek by William Tyndale in 1534 (with an introduction) (modern spelling ed.), New Haven and London: Yale University Press.
- ——— (1992), Daniell, David (ed.), Tyndale's Old Testament: being the Pentateuch of 1530, Joshua to 2. Chronicles of 1537 and Jonah, translated by William Tyndale (with an introduction by David Daniell) (modern spelling ed.), New Haven and London: Yale University Press.
- ——— (2000), Daniell, David (ed.), The Obedience of a Christian Man (with an introduction and notes), London: Penguin Classics.
- ——— (2003), Daniell, David (ed.), Selected Writings (with an introduction and notes), Manchester: Carcanet Press.

== See also ==
- William Tyndale
- Tyndale Bible
- English translations of the Bible
- Luther Bible
- Matthew Bible
- King James Bible
- William Shakespeare
- John Buchan, 1st Baron Tweedsmuir
