= Tyndale Bible =

Early Modern English translation of the Bible

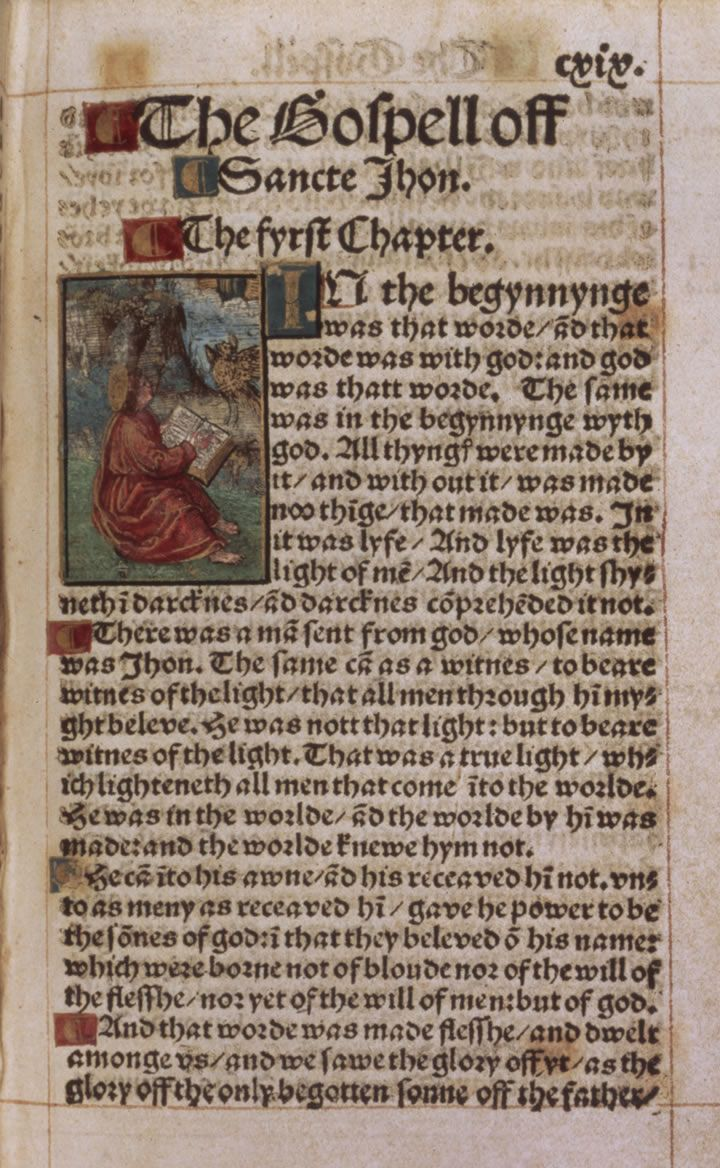
- The first page of the Gospel of John from Tyndale's 1526 New Testament (British Library)
- Abbreviation: TYN
- NT published: 1526
- Translation type: Formal equivalence
- Revision: 1534, 1535 (Note: The minor further revisions made by Tyndale in the 1535 "GH" (that is, the publisher: Godfried van der Haghen) New Testament edition were not used by future English Bible translations. Tyndale did not contribute to any further TYN revisions found in print due to his arrest on May 24, 1535, being subsequently imprisoned until his execution.)

The Tyndale Bible generally refers to the body of biblical translations by the English Biblical scholar and linguist William Tyndale, made in c. 1522–1535. Tyndale's biblical text is credited with being the first English-language Biblical translation to work directly from Greek and, for the Pentateuch, Hebrew texts. The Vulgate and German Bibles were also used. It was the first English Biblical translation that was mass produced as a result of new advances in the art of printing.

Tyndale never published a complete Bible in English. He translated the New Testament, the Pentateuch, and produced a now lost translation of the historical books of the Old Testament. Of these, the Pentateuch, the Book of Jonah, and a revised version of the Book of Genesis were all published during his lifetime. His other Old Testament works were used in the creation of the Matthew Bible. The remaining books of the Old Testament were translated by the English ecclesiastical reformer Myles Coverdale. He supplemented Tyndale's translations with his own to produce the first complete printed Bible in English in 1535. (Note: "Knowing neither Hebrew nor Greek, Coverdale consulted Latin (Vulgate and Pagninus’ Latin version of 1528), English (translations associated with Tyndale), German (Luther’s translation) and Swiss (Zurich Bible of 1531 and 1534) sources to guide him on those portions of the Old Testament that Tyndale had not finished (Matthew’s Bible, Introduction, ix) and to adapt those portions of the Old Testament that Tyndale had finished as well as the Tyndale New Testament of 1526.")

== History ==
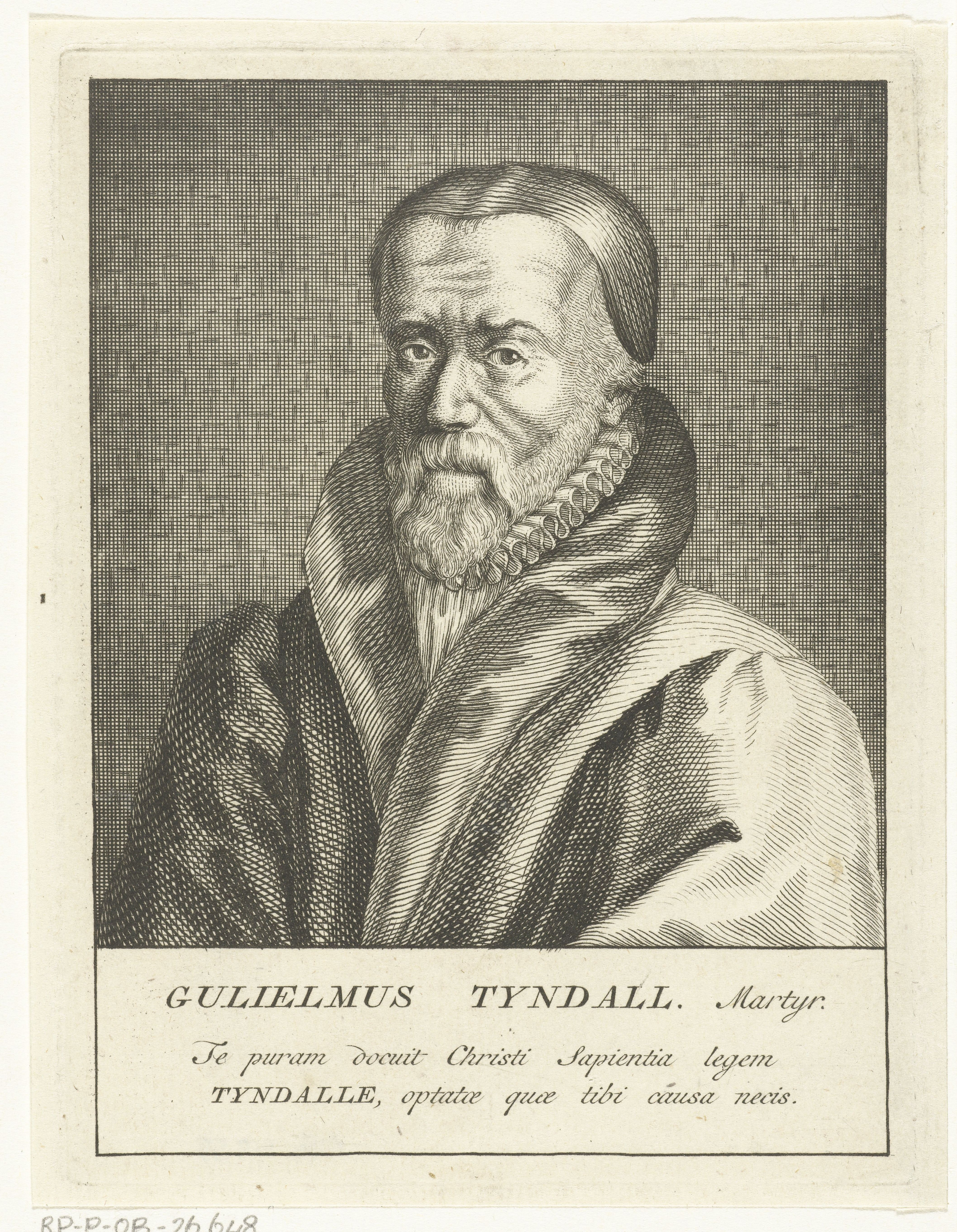
The portrait of William Tyndale, engraved by Frans van Bleyswyck (Rijksmuseum)

In 1522, the English linguist and scholar William Tyndale acquired a copy of Martin Luther's Bible. Tyndale began a translation of the New Testament into English, using Luther's Bible, the Latin Vulgate, (Note: Only Latin was used in church services, and so the Vulgate was the only translation in use by the Catholic Church.) the annotated Latin and Greek text compiled by the Dutch humanist Erasmus from several Greek manuscripts, and texts then thought to pre-date the Vulgate. Tyndale made his intention to translate the Bible into English known to Cuthbert Tunstall (the Bishop of London and Erasmus' collaborator). Tunstall refused to approve of or finance the project. Thwarted in England, Tyndale moved to Hamburg, where his New Testament was published in 1524.

A partial edition of the New Testament was printed in 1525 in Cologne, of which a single fragment survives, now kept in the British Library. But before the work could be completed, Tyndale was betrayed to the authorities and forced to leave the city. The first complete edition of his New Testament was published in 1526 by Peter Schöffer the Younger, Of the thousands of copies smuggled into England during Tyndale's lifetime, three have survived; these are held by St Paul's Cathedral, London, the British Library, and the Württembergische Landesbibliothek in Stuttgart. Revised editions were printed by Tyndale in 1534 and 1536.

Tyndale's translation of the Pentateuch was published at Antwerp by Merten de Keyser and Joannes Grapheus in 1530. His English translation of the Book of Jonah was published the following year. This was followed by his revised version of the Book of Genesis in 1534. He translated the Joshua, Judges, First and Second Samuel, First and Second Kings and First and Second Chronicles from the Old Testament. These remained unpublished until they were included in the Matthew Bible, printed by Tyndale's associate John Rogers in 1537; they have not survived in their original form.

When translating the New Testament, Tyndale possibly referred to the 1522 edition of Erasmus's Novum Instrumentum omne, as well as Luther's German version of the New Testament, and the Vulgate. It may be the case that Tyndale stayed away from using Wycliffite Bibles as a source because he did not want his Early Modern English to reflect the Middle English used prior to the Renaissance. It is unlikely, however, that he could avoid having read Wycliffe's work. Tyndale claimed he did not translate with an existing English "ensample", however almost three fifths of the pre-existing Wycliffite language was used by Tyndale.

Tyndale's works were influential in the creation of the Matthew Bible (1537), and are reflected in later versions of the Bible, such as the King James Version.

=== Catholic reaction ===
Tyndale's translations and polemical books were condemned and banned in England by the Catholic authorities. In particular almost all copies of his first 1526 New Testament, which authorities regarded as particularly flawed, were ordered by Tunstall to be bought up and burned. Thomas More, the Lord Chancellor of the English king Henry VIII, claimed that he had purposely mistranslated the ancient texts in order to promote anti-clericalism and heretical views. In particular they cited the terms "church", "priest", "do penance" and "charity", which became in the Tyndale translation "congregation", "senior" (changed to "elder" in the revised edition of 1534), "repent" and "love", challenging key doctrines of the Roman Catholic Church. Most of these ideas originated from More's best friend, the Catholic scholar Erasmus; however, More insisted that Erasmus' intent was to enrich the meaning and not to subvert Catholic teaching.

=== Trial and execution of Tyndale ===
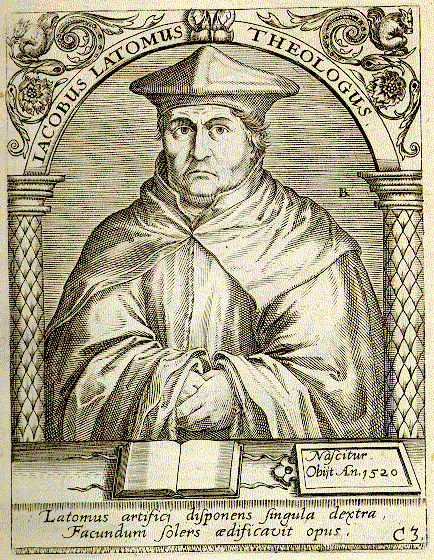
Jacobus Latomus

In 1535, Tyndale was arrested by the Antwerp authorities. He was imprisoned in the castle at Vilvoorde, during which time the Catholic theologian Jacobus Latomus and he spent almost a year and a half attempting to convince each other in a series of private books.

In August 1536 he was declared a heretic for his Lutheran advocacy and defrocked. Tyndale now being outside the derestriction of the Church. he was sentenced to be strangled to death and his body burned. Tyndale was not condemned because of translating or publishing Scriptures, which was not a crime in the Low Countries, but for the promulgation of Lutheran views that the Catholic states considered seditious or a threat to peace.

=== English ban ===
In 1543, The English Parliament enacted Henry VIII's Act for the Advancement of True Religion which banned keeping and using "books and writings in the English tongue, teaching or comprising any matters of Christian religion, articles of the faith, or Holy Scripture...", including Tyndale's translation of the New Testament.

== Challenges to Catholic doctrine ==
Tyndale's translation of the Bible had notes critical of the Roman Catholic Church.

The Catholic Church had long proclaimed that the only true Church was the Catholic Church. The word church in Catholic teaching could only be used of the Catholic Church, and there was no other organized religion in England at that time. Some radical reformers preached that the true church was the "invisible" church, that the church is wherever true Christians meet together to preach the word of God. To these reformers, the Catholic Church was unnecessary, and its very existence proved that it was in fact not the "true" Church. When Tyndale translated the Greek word ἐκκλησία (ekklēsía) as congregation, he was thereby undermining the entire structure of the Catholic Church.

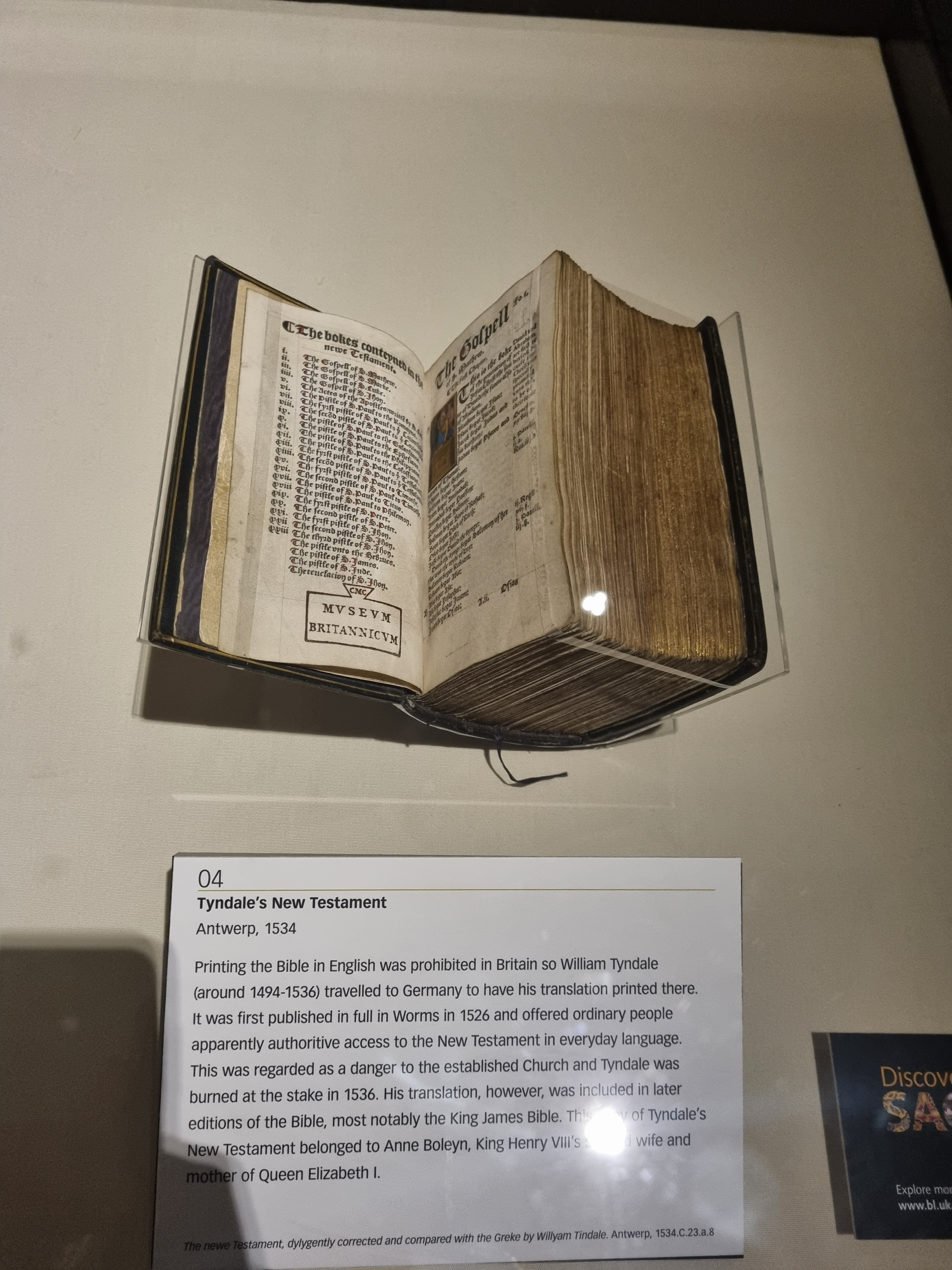
A Tyndale New Testament in the British Library, London.

Many of the reform movements believed in the authority of scripture alone. To them it dictated how a "true" church should be organized and administered. By changing the translation from church to congregation Tyndale was providing ammunition for the beliefs of the reformers. Their belief that the church was not a visible systematized institution but a body defined by believers, however organized, who held a specifically Protestant understanding of the Gospel and salvation was now to be found directly in Tyndale's translation of Scripture.

Tyndale's use of the word congregation conflicted with the Catholic Church's doctrine that the lay members and the clergy were two separate classes within the Church, and the Catholic teaching of the Sacrament of Ordination. If the true church is defined as a congregation, the common believers, then the Catholic Church's claim that the clergy were of a consecrated order different than the average Christian and that they had different functions within the Church no longer held sway.

Tyndale's translation of the Greek word πρεσβύτερος (presbúteros) to mean elder instead of priest also challenged the doctrines of the Catholic Church.

In particular, it undermined the Catholic Mass and its nature as a sacrifice. The role of the priest in the Catholic Church was to offer the sacrifice of Christ's body and blood in the ritual of the Mass, to bless, to conduct other religious ceremonies, to read and explain the scripture to the people, and to administer the other sacraments. In these ways they are different from the common believers.

In many reform movements a group of elders would lead the church and take the place of the Catholic priests. These elders were not a separate class from the common believers; in fact, they were usually selected from amongst them. Many reformers believed in the idea of the priesthood of all believers, which meant that every Christian was in fact a priest and had, for example, the right to read and interpret scripture. Tyndale's translation challenged the claim of scriptural basis for Catholic clerical authority.

Catholic doctrine was also challenged by Tyndale's translation of the Greek μετανοεῖτε (metanoeîte) as repent instead of do penance. This translation conflicted with the Catholic Sacrament of Confession.

Tyndale's translation of scripture was underpinned by the belief that it was Christ alone who had—by the giving of the Holy Spirit—given the power to forgive sins to his disciples.

Tyndale's position on Christian salvation differed from the views of the Catholic Church, which followed the belief that salvation was granted to the faithful who maintained the State of Grace by living in charity, faith and hope, and participating in the Church's seven Sacraments in the light of the Church's teaching. Tyndale's translation challenged the belief that a repentant person should still do penance for their sins after they were forgiven by God. According to Tyndale's New Testament translation and other Protestant reformers, a believer could repent with a sincere heart, and God would forgive without an intent of submission to some formal restitution.

Tyndale's translation of the Bible challenged the Catholic Church in many other ways. For example, Tyndale's translation of the Bible into a vernacular language made it available to the common English-speaking person. Tyndale wanted everyone to have access to scripture and gave the common people the ability to read it for themselves but with a decidedly Protestant orientation in the choice of words used and in its annotations, which were suffused with Tyndale's Protestant beliefs.

The greatest challenge that Tyndale's Bible caused the Catholic Church is summed up by a later story about Tyndale's reason for translating the Bible: to "cause a boy that driveth the plough to know more scripture than the clergy of the day", many of whom were poorly educated. (See Plowboy trope.) By this, Tyndale sought to undermine the Catholic Church's authority regarding the access to and interpretation of scripture, which he saw as detrimental. To Tyndale, a Roman Catholic priesthood was not needed as an intermediary between a person and God.

== Legacy ==
The importance of the Tyndale Bible in shaping and influencing the English language has been mentioned. According to one writer, Tyndale is "the man who more than Shakespeare even or Bunyan has moulded and enriched our language."

=== Impact on the English language ===
In translating the Bible, Tyndale invented new words into the English language; More pointed out this was problematic for a "vernacular" translation. Many were subsequently used in the King James Bible.

As well as individual words, Tyndale also is reported as having coined many familiar phrases, however, many of the claimed expressions turn out to have antecedents in the Middle English Bible translations or the German.

Many of the popular phrases and Bible verses that people quote today are in the language of Tyndale. An example of this is Matthew 5:9, "Blessed are the peacemakers." Such Germanic compound words as "peacemaker" are hallmarks of Tyndale's prose, and follow Middle English word-formation principles more than Modern English.

==== Words or terms ====
- Passover (as the name for the Jewish holiday, Pesach or Pesah)
- Scapegoat - When the Temple in Jerusalem stood, a portion of the Yom Kippur service was the lottery drawn on two goats, with one selected to be sacrificed as an offering and the other sent to Azazel to be thrown off a cliff, with the second goat translated as the "escapegoat", whose first letter was later omitted.
- atonement
  - A concatenation of the words 'At One' to describe Christ's work of restoring a good relationship—a reconciliation—between God and people) is also sometimes ascribed to Tyndale. However, the word was probably in use by at least 1513, before Tyndale's translation.
- mercy seat
  - Literal translation of Luther's German Gnadenstuhl.

==== Phrases ====
Phrases which seem to have come from Tyndale include:

- the word of God which liveth and lasteth forever
- let there be light
  - Wycliffe 1382: Liyt be maad
- the powers that be
- it came to pass
- the signs of the times
- filthy lucre
- fashion not yourselves to the world
- use of trespass in the Lord's Prayer

Phrases sometimes attributed to Tyndale but with very similar antecedents include:

- in the twinclinge of an eye
  - Pricke of Conscience c.1340: In þe space of a twynkellyng of ane eghe.
- my brother's keeper
  - Wycliffe 1382: the kepere of my brothir
- judge not that ye be not judged
  - Vulgate: Nolite judicare, ut non judicemini
- knock and it shall be opened unto you
  - Wycliffe 1382: knocke ye, and it schal be openyd to you
- a moment in time
  - Wycliffe 1382: a moment of tyme
- seek and ye shall find
  - Wycliffe 1382: seke ye, and ye schulen fynde
- ask and it shall be given you
  - Wycliffe 1382: Axe ye, and it schal be ȝovun to you
- the salt of the earth
  - Wycliffe 1382: salt of the erthe
- a law unto themselves
  - Wycliffe 1382: lawe to hem silf
- the spirit is willing, but the flesh is weak
  - Luther's translation of Matthew 26:41: der Geist ist willig, aber das Fleisch ist schwach
  - Wycliffe 1382: for the spirit is redi, but the fleisch is sijk (for the spirit is ready, but the flesh is sick).
- live, move and have our being
  - Wycliffe 1382: lyven, and moven, and ben

==== Controversy over new words and phrases ====
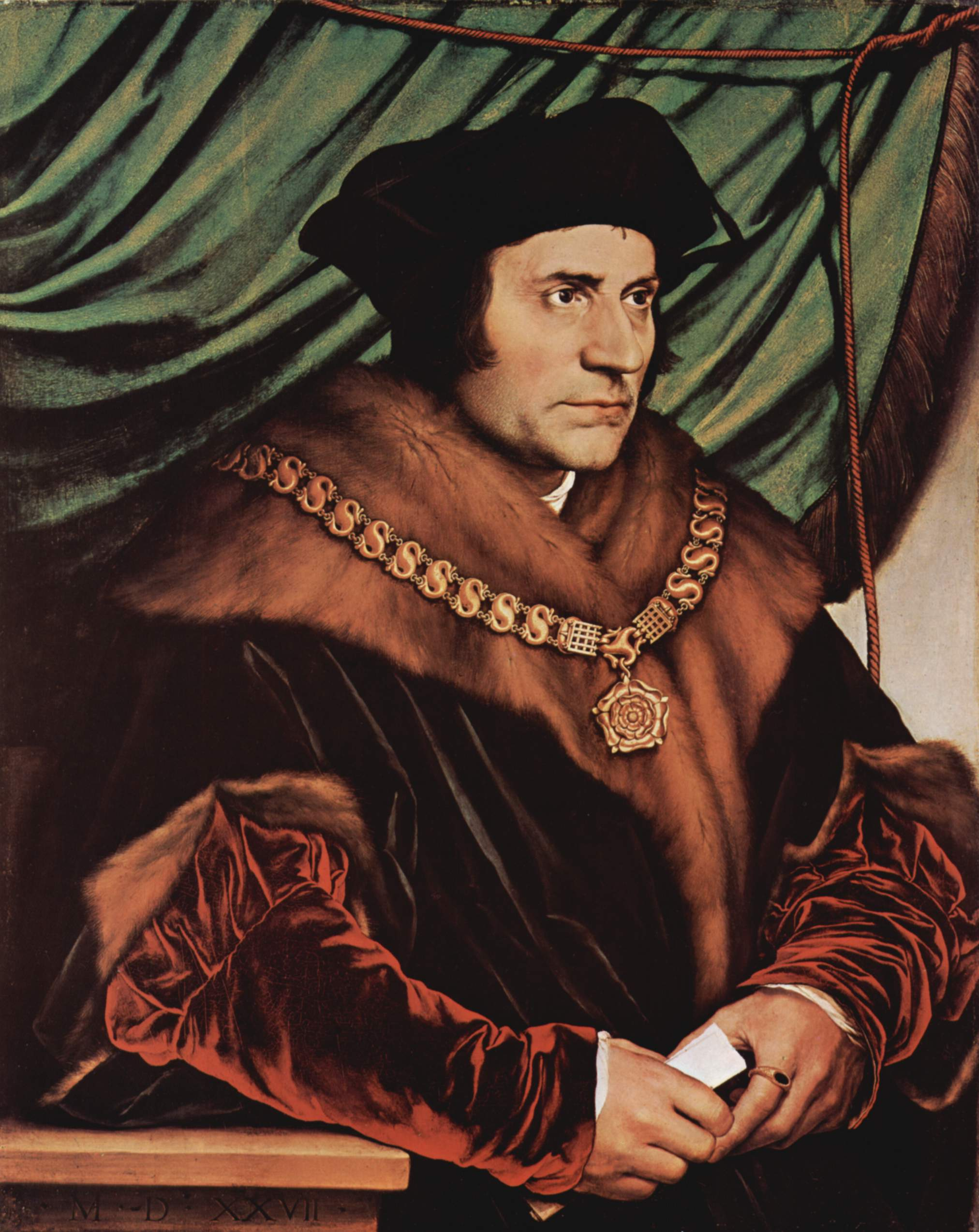
Portrait of Thomas More by Hans Holbein in the Frick Collection

The hierarchy and intelligentsia of the English Catholic Church did not approve of some of the words and phrases introduced by Tyndale, such as "overseer", where it would have been understood as "bishop", "elder" for "priest", and "love" rather than "charity". Tyndale, citing Erasmus (who was referring to the Latin not English), contended that the Greek New Testament did not support the traditional readings. Controversially, Tyndale translated the Greek ekklesia (Greek: εκκλησία), (literally "called out ones") as "congregation" rather than "church". It has been asserted this translation choice "was a direct threat to the Church's ancient – but, so Tyndale here made clear, non-scriptural – claim to be the body of Christ on earth. To change these words was to strip the Church hierarchy of its pretensions to be Christ's terrestrial representative, and to award this honor to individual worshipers who made up each congregation."

Tyndale used ester for páskha (πάσχα) in his New Testament, where Wycliffe had used pask. When Tyndale embarked on his Old Testament translation, he realised that the anachronism of ester could not be sustained; and so coined the neologism passover, which later Bible versions adopted, and substituted for ester in the New Testament as well. Its remnant is seen as Easter once in the King James Version in Acts 12:4 and twice in the Bishops' Bible, John 11:55 as well as Acts 12:4.

In the final verse of Matthew chapter 2, Tyndale used the phrase "of Nazareth" meaning from the town of Nazareth for "Nazōraios" ("Ναζωραῖος") in his 1525 translation where Wycliffe had used "a Nazarey", but in his 1534 revision Tyndale changed his translation of this word to "a Nazarite" referring to a person who has undertaken a vow of abstinence as detailed in chapter 6 of the Book of Numbers in the Old Testament. Tyndales's 1534 translation of this word in Matthew 2:23 was subsequently repeated in the 1535 Coverdale, 1537 Matthew, 1539 Taverner, 1540 Great, 1560 Geneva, 1568 Bishops', and 1582 Douay-Rheims Bibles, but was changed to "a Nazarene" in the 1611 King James Bible, in accordance with Strong's Concordance of the Bible. Today virtually all modern translations use the term "a Nazarene" (a person from the town of Nazareth) in Matthew 2:23; a notable exception is Julia Evelina Smith's 1876 translation in which she also used the phrase "a Nazarite".

Tyndale was accused of translation errors. Thomas More commented that searching for errors in (the first edition of) the Tyndale Bible was similar to searching for water in the sea and charged Tyndale's translation of The Obedience of a Christian Man with having about a thousand false translations. Bishop Tunstall of London declared that there were upwards of 2,000 errors in Tyndale's 1525/1526 Bible, having already in 1523 denied Tyndale the permission required under the Constitutions of Oxford (1409), which were still in force, to translate the Bible into English. Tyndale in the Prologue to his 1525 translation wrote that he never intentionally altered or misrepresented any of the Bible but that he had sought to "interpret the sense of the scripture and the meaning of the spirit."

While translating, Tyndale followed Erasmus's 1522 Greek edition of the New Testament. In his preface to his 1534 New Testament ("WT unto the Reader"), he not only goes into some detail about the Greek tenses but also points out that there is often a Hebrew idiom underlying the Greek. The Tyndale Society adduces much further evidence to show that his translations were made directly from the original Hebrew and Greek sources he had at his disposal. For example, the Prolegomena in Mombert's William Tyndale's Five Books of Moses show that Tyndale's Pentateuch is a translation of the Hebrew original. His translation also drew on the Vulgate and Luther's 1521 September Testament. Of the first (1526) edition of Tyndale's New Testament, only three copies survive. The only complete copy is part of the Bible Collection of Württembergische Landesbibliothek, Stuttgart. The copy of the British Library is almost complete, lacking only the title page and list of contents. Another rarity is Tyndale's Pentateuch, of which only nine remain.

=== Impact on English Bibles ===
Tyndale's Bible laid the foundations for many of the English Bibles which followed his. His work made up a significant portion of the Great Bible of 1539, which was the first authorized version of the English Bible.

The translators of the Revised Standard Version in the 1940s noted that Tyndale's translation, including the 1537 Matthew Bible, inspired the translations that followed: The Great Bible of 1539; the Geneva Bible of 1560; the Bishops' Bible of 1568; the Douay-Rheims Bible of 1582–1609; and the King James Version of 1611, of which the RSV translators noted: "It [the KJV] kept felicitous phrases and apt expressions, from whatever source, which had stood the test of public usage. It owed most, especially in the New Testament, to Tyndale".

Joan Bridgman comments on the Contemporary Review that, "He [Tyndale] is the mainly unrecognized translator of the most influential book in the world. Although the Authorised King James Version is ostensibly the production of a learned committee of churchmen, it is mostly cribbed from Tyndale with some reworking of his translation."

It has been suggested that around 90% of the King James Version (or at least of the parts translated by Tyndale) is from Tyndale's works, with as much as one third of the text being word-for-word Tyndale.

However, historians such as Richard Marsden have cautioned that much scriptural language is simple and "offers little scope for variation by translators," and note that Tyndale himself was not working from scratch with a tabula rasa.

Many of the English versions since then have drawn inspiration from Tyndale, such as the Revised Standard Version, the New American Standard Bible, and the English Standard Version. Even the paraphrases like the Living Bible have been inspired by the same desire to make the Bible understandable to Tyndale's proverbial plowboy.

The Tyndale Bible also played a key role in spreading Reformation ideas to England which had been reluctant to embrace the movement. By including many of Martin Luther's commentaries in his works, Tyndale also allowed the people of England direct access to the words and ideas of Luther, whose works had been banned in England. William Maldon's account of learning to read to directly access the Tyndale Bible testified to the sometimes violent opposition to the translation's use.

== Sources ==
- Arblaster, Paul; Juhász, Gergely; Latré, Guido, eds. (2002). Tyndale's Testament. Turnhout: Brepols. ISBN 978-2-503-51411-6.
- Bridgman, Joan (2000). "Tyndale's New Testament". The Contemporary Review. 277 (1619): 342–346 – via Wikipedia Library.
- Coggan, Donald (1968). The English Bible. London: Longmans, Green & Co. ISSN 0010-7565.
- Attar, Karen (2016). A Directory of Rare Book and Special Collections in the UK and Republic of Ireland. American Library Association. ISBN 9781783300167.
- Daniell, David (2001). William Tyndale: A Biography. Yale University Press. ISBN 9780300068801.
- Daniell, David (2003). The Bible in English: Its History and Influence. Yale University Press. ISBN 978-0-300-09930-0.
- Daniell, David (2011). "Tyndale, William". Oxford Dictionary of National Biography (online ed.). Oxford University Press. doi:10.1093/ref:odnb/27947. OCLC 56568095. (Subscription, Wikipedia Library access or UK public library membership required.) (subscription may be required or content may be available in libraries that are in the UK)
- Gillon, Campbell (1991). Words to Trust. Lanham, Maryland: Barnes & Noble. ISBN 978-0-389-20949-2.
- Juhász, Gergely; Arblaster, Paul (2005). "Can Translating the Bible Be Bad for Your Health?: William Tyndale and the Falsification of Memory". In Johan Leemans (ed.). More Than a Memory: The Discourse of Martyrdom and the Construction of Christian Identity in the History of Christianity. Peeters Publishers. ISBN 978-90-429-1688-3.
- Kenyon, Sir Frederic (1936). The Story of the Bible. New York: Dutton & Co. Inc. OCLC 931096149.
- Lindberg, Carter (1996). The European Reformations (2nd ed.). Malden, Massachusetts: Wiley-Blackwell. ISBN 978-1-4051-8068-9.
- McGrath, Alister E. (2000). Christian Literature: An Anthology. Wiley. ISBN 978-0-631-21606-3.
- Marsden, Richard (2000). "'In the Twinkling of an Eye': The English of Scripture before Tyndale". Leeds Studies in English. 3: 145–172.
- Moo, Douglas J. (1996). The Epistle to the Romans. Wm. B. Eerdmans. ISBN 978-0-8028-2317-5.
- Moynahan, Brian (2002), William Tyndale: If God Spare my Life, London: Abacus, ISBN 978-0-349-11532-0
- Moynahan, Brian (2003a). William Tyndale: If God Spare my Life - A Story of Martyrdom, Betrayal and the English Bible. London: Abacus. ISBN 034911532X.
- Moynahan, Brian (2003b), God's Bestseller: William Tyndale, Thomas More, and the Writing of the English Bible—A Story of Martyrdom and Betrayal, St. Martin's Press
- Naudé, Jacobus A. (2022). "Emergence of the Tyndale–King James Version tradition in English Bible translation". HTS Teologiese Studies / Theological Studies. 78 (1). doi:10.4102/hts.v78i1.7649.
- Norton, David (2000). A History of the English Bible as Literature (PDF). Cambridge University Press.
- Partridge, A.C. (1973). English Biblical Translation. London: André Deutsch Limited. ISBN 978-0-233-96129-3.
- Scheck, Thomas P. (2021). "Thomas More: First and Best Apologist for Erasmus". Moreana. 58 (1): 75–111. doi:10.3366/more.2021.0093. S2CID 236358666.
- Shaheen, Naseeb (2011). Biblical References in Shakespeare's Plays. University of Delaware. ISBN 978-1-61149-373-3.
- Teems, David (2012). Tyndale: The Man Who Gave God An English Voice. Thomas Nelson publishers.
- Thompson, Craig R. (1958). The Bible in English: 1525-1611. Washington, D.C.: Folger Shakespeare Library.
- Wickham, Glynne; Berry, Herbert; Ingram, William, eds. (2000). English Professional Theatre, 1530-1660. Cambridge, UK: Cambridge University Press. ISBN 9780521230124.
