= God's Outlaw (1986 film) =

1986 film by Tony Tew

God's Outlaw is a 1986 British historical film directed by Tony Tew and starring Roger Rees, Bernard Archard and Keith Barron. It depicts the historical figure of William Tyndale and his struggles with the authorities in the time of Henry VIII for translating the Bible into English.

== Cast ==
- Sebastian Abineri ... William Roye
- Anthony Allen ... Thomas Poyntz
- Bernard Archard ... Sir Thomas More
- Keith Barron ... Henry VIII
- Sharon Baylis ... Mrs Poyntz
- Alan Bennion ... Archdeacon Bell
- Terence Budd ... Stephen Vaughan
- David Chivers ... Old Priest
- Arthur Cox ... Peter Quentel
- Kenneth Gilbert ... Humphrey Monmouth
- Willoughby Goddard ... Cardinal Wolsey
- Terrence Hardiman ... Thomas Cromwell
- Stuart Harrison ... Henry Phillips
- Michael Haughey ... Jacques Masson
- Harold Innocent ... Doctor
- Timothy Kightley ... Priest
- Oona Kirsch ... Anne Boleyn
- Leon Lissek ... Herman Rincke
- Richard Mapletoft ... Simon Mourton
- Frank Moorey ... Johann Cochlaeus
- Steve Newman ... Richard
- Tony Phillips ... Messenger
- Gary Raymond ... Sir John Walsh
- Roger Rees ... William Tyndale
- Pamela Salem ... Lady Anne Walsh
- Paul Shelley ... John Frith
- Joanna Tew ... Girl
- Derek Ware ... Friar Stafford
- George Waring ... Bishop Tunstall
- Lydia Watson ... Lady in Waiting
- Jerome Willis ... Bishop Stokesley
