= Thomas Hitton =

English Protestant, executed 1530 CE

Thomas Hitton (died February 1530) is generally considered to be the first English Protestant martyr of the Reformation, although the followers of Wycliffe—the Lollards—had been burned at the stake as late as 1519.

Hitton was a priest who had joined William Tyndale and the English exiles in the Low Countries, returning to England briefly in 1529—to contact the supporters of Tyndale, and to arrange for the distribution of smuggled books such as the upcoming first English Psalter translated by George Joye.

Hitton believed in the supremacy of the Scriptures and denied the authority of bishops; only Scripture in good conscience was the basis for spiritual law (i.e. what is sinful), and all breaches of this law were mortal sins. He also argued that baptism "would be much better if it were spoken in English". This means he wanted baptism to be conducted in the common language of the Englishmen.

He was seized near Gravesend on his way to the coast to take a ship and was found to be in possession of letters from the English exiles. He was then arrested on the grounds of suspected heresy by a bailiff of the Archbishop of Canterbury. He was put through a formal series of five interviews by Archbishop William Warham at various intervals of a month or a week, forthrightly confirmed his belief in various heresies, given opportunities to amend the trial record to ensure it was accurate, admitted to previously importing two banned Tyndale New Testaments and Joye's Primer, would not say whom he had given them to, called the Pope the Anti-Christ, and refused to accept promises of mercy if he abjured or to be convinced otherwise. He was passed to Rochester Bishop John Fisher who confirmed with him again all the evidence and records, in English, and the consequences and ways to escape them, but Hitton refused to abjure. He was therefore determined to be a persistent heretic, outside the protection of the Church, and passed to the secular authority for punishment according to English law.

He was burned at the stake at Maidstone on 23 February 1530.

When Joye's second Primer (entitled Hortulus animae) appeared a year later, he included the feast of "Sainte Thomas mar." (referring to Hitton) in the calendar; new Lord Chancellor Thomas More had followed the case and saw this as an insult against his hero and name-saint, Thomas Becket, and described Hitton as "the devil's stinking martyr". He criticized George Joye for canonizing Hitton:

In theyr calendar before theyr deuout prayers, they haue sette vs a new saynt/ syr Thomas Hitton the heretyke that was burned in Kent, [...] they haue as I sayde sette his name in the calendar byfore a boke of theyr englyshe prayours, yn the name of saynt Thomas the martyr, in the vigyle of the blessed apostle saynte Mathye, the xxiii. daye of February.

Tyndale also referred briefly to Hitton's execution:

And More amonge his other blasphemies in his Dialoge sayth that none of vs dare abyde by our fayth vnto deeth: but shortlye therafter/ god to proue More/ that he hath euer bene/ euen a false lyare/ gaue strength vnto his servaunte syr Thomas Hitton/ to confesse and that vnto the deeth the fayth of his holie sonne Iesus/ whiche Tomas the bishopes of Caunterburye & Rochester/ after they had dieted and tormented him secretlye murthered at Maydstone most cruellye.

John Foxe does not allege torture, or the involvement of More.

== See also ==
- William Tyndale
- Thomas More
- John Fisher
- English Reformation
