= George Joye =

16th-century Bible translator

- Born: c. 1495; Bedfordshire, England
- Died: 1553
- Education: Christ's College, Cambridge
- Known for: Bible Translation

George Joye (also Joy and Jaye) (c. 1495 – 1553) was a 16th-century Bible translator who produced the first printed translation of several books of the Old Testament into English (1530–1534), as well as the first English Primer (1529).

== His life ==
=== Education ===
He was born at Salpho Bury, Renhold, Bedford, Bedfordshire, England, around 1495. He studied at Christ's College, Cambridge where he graduated as Bachelor of Arts (1513 or 1514). In 1515 he was ordained priest. In 1517 he obtained the degree of Master of Arts, was elected Fellow of Peterhouse and became "inceptor in arte." In 1525 Joye graduated as Bachelor of Divinity. During his years in Cambridge, he came into contact with several people who later became prominent figures of the Protestant Reformation. Under their influence Joye also embraced Luther's ideas. In 1526, when the premises of the university were searched and Joye's copy of Chrysostom's exegetical sermons on the Book of Genesis in Johannes Oecolampadius' translation was discovered, Stephen Gardiner's intercession saved Joye from the authorities, but the following year (1527) he had less luck. When John Ashwell, Augustinian Prior of Newnham Priory, denounced him as a heretic to John Longland, bishop of Lincoln, chancellor of Oxford and confessor to King Henry VIII, Joye was summoned before Cardinal Wolsey at Westminster together with Thomas Bilney and Thomas Arthur. Joye waited for several days in Wolsey's antechamber to be received by the Cardinal, and witnessed the interrogation of Bilney and Arthur, which made him realize that it was safer for him to flee to the Continent.

=== First exile in Antwerp ===
It is sometimes thought that he went first to Strasbourg, but in 1529 at the latest he must have moved to Antwerp, where many other English Protestants took refuge (e.g. William Tyndale, Thomas Hitton, Robert Barnes, William Roye, and Myles Coverdale). Like Coverdale, Joye was probably also employed in the printing business as proofreader, translator, and author of religious books.

His first, now lost publication was a Primer, the first Protestant devotional book ever published in English. Based on contemporary accounts, it probably contained the translation of the seven penitential psalms, "Mattens and Euensong" with the Commendations (Psalm 119). The book was criticized by Thomas More for omitting the Litany of the Saints, the hymns and anthems to the Blessed Virgin, and the Dirge.

After the publication of his Primer, containing perhaps as many as thirty psalms, Joye set out to translate the rest of the Book of Psalms, which appeared in 1530. Joye used Martin Bucer's recent Latin translation of the Hebrew text, which was published under the pseudonym Aretius Felinus. In the same year Joye produced a revised version of his earlier primer with the title Ortolus animae. The garden of the soule.

In 1531, Joye's translation of the Book of Isaiah appeared, which seems to have been intended as a twin volume to Tyndale's translation of the Book of Jonah. In 1531 Joye also published a defence countering the charges of heresy put against him by Ashwell in 1527.

By 1532 he married. Butterworth and Chester suggest that Joye published the translations of the Book of Proverbs and of Ecclesiastes in 1533 in Antwerp, of which only later London reprints have survived. It is now also believed that Joye is the author of an anonymously published treatise entitled The Souper of the Lorde, which was earlier attributed to Tyndale. In this Joye described his position on the Eucharist, based on that of Zwingli.

Joye's translation of the Book of Jeremiah, of Lamentations, and a new translation of the Psalter followed (this time from the Latin Psalter of Zwingli, whose Latin commentaries and translations had also served as source texts for Joye's translations of the other books of the Old Testament). All these translations were the first of these books ever printed in English.

In 1534 Joye undertook the proofreading of Tyndale's New Testament edition that had been reprinted three times without any English-speaking corrector by the Flemish printing firm of the family Van Ruremund. Joye, however, not only corrected the typographical errors, but he also changed the term "resurreccion" as found in Tyndale's text by expressions such as "the lyfe after this" in some twenty occurrences of the word. Joye believed, as he later explained, that the original term in the Bible in those places did not refer to the bodily resurrection but to the intermediate state of the soul. At the same time, Joye retained Tyndale's original formulation at the some 150 other occurrences of the word, where he agreed with Tyndale that the term did refer to the bodily resurrection. Tyndale reacted by bringing out his own revised version of his New Testament in November 1534, in which he inserted a second foreword attacking Joye and his editorial work. Tyndale accused Joye of promoting the heresy of the denial of the bodily resurrection and causing divisions among Protestants. After an inconclusive attempt to reconcile the parties, Joye published an apology to refute Tyndale's accusations in February 1535.

=== Return to England, second exile in Antwerp and final years again in England ===
In April 1535, Tyndale was betrayed by Henry Phillips, who also wanted to have Joye and Robert Barnes arrested, but Joye escaped and returned to England through Calais. Apart from the publication (1535) of an English translation of a Latin pamphlet, published a year earlier in Antwerp, there is nothing known about his years in England. Around the same time when Coverdale sought refuge again on the Continent, Joye, too, fled to Antwerp. During his second exile, he published apologetic works on various subjects, among which is a defense of the clergy's right to marry, against Stephen Gardiner. In several of his works, he emphasizes that Christ's true Church has always been persecuted. Joye, as many of his contemporaries, was convinced that they lived in apocalyptic times and that the Return of Christ was not far away. After Henry's death (1547), Joye returned to England. In May 1548, he published a translation of a book by Andreas Osiander about conjectures of the end of the world, in which he projected the end of the world between 1585 and 1625. In 1549, Joye debated the question of the preferred punishment of adulterers with John Foxe. In September 1549, Joye was given the Rectory of Blunham, Bedfordshire by Sir Henry Grey of Flitton, and in 1550 he was appointed Rector of Ashwell, Hertfordshire. George Joye died in 1553.

== Legacy ==
Joye's translations of Psalms, Isaiah, Proverbs, Ecclesiastes, Jeremiah and Lamentations, were the first English publications of these books of the Bible ever printed. His translations of the Psalter and his primer were repeatedly republished, and influenced the Anglican Book of Common Prayer and private Protestant devotion. His Biblical translations were used by Myles Coverdale (for the Coverdale Bible), and by others. Some of Joye's wordings were kept or reintroduced in later versions (e.g. "sauing helthe" (Psalms 67:2), "backslide" (Jeremiah 3:6,12,14,22), "a mess of pottage" (Proverbs 15:17), or the proverb "Pryde goth before a fall/ and a fall foloweth a proude mynde" (Proverbs 16:18). It was also Joye's translation of Psalms 91:5 in his first Psalter ("Thou shalt not nede to be afrayde of nyght bugges", where "bugges" refers to bogies or evils spirits), which was copied by Coverdale (1535) and by John Rogers in the Matthew Bible (1537), and which was retained even in the Great Bible (1539). Based on this expression these Bibles are sometimes called the "Bugge Bibles.".

== Works ==
- (lost primer) (Antwerp?, 1529).
- Ortulus anime. The garden of the soule: or the englisshe primers, Argentine: Francis Foxe (vere Antwerp: Merten de Keyser), 1530.
- The Prophete Isaye, Straszburg: Balthassar Beckenth (vere Antwerp: Merten de Keyser), 10 May 1531.
- The letters which IOHAN ASHWELL Priour of Newnham Abbey besids Bedforde/ sente secretly to the / in the yeare of our Lorde M.D.xvij. Where in the sayde priour accuseth George Joye that tyme being felawe of Peter college in Cambridge/ of fower opinions: with the answer of the sayed George vn to the same opinions, Straszburg (vere Antwerp: Merten de Keyser), 10 June 1531.
- The souper of the Lorde: wher vnto, that thou mayst be the better prepared and suerlyer enstructed: haue here firste the declaracion of the later parte of the .6. ca. of S. Johan, beginninge at the letter C. the fowerth lyne before the crosse, at these wordis: merely were. &c wheryn incidently M. Moris letter agenst Johan Frythe is confuted, Nornburg: Niclas twonson (vere Antwerp), 5 April 1533.
- The Subuersion of Moris false foundacion: where upon he sweteth to set faste and shoue vnder his shameles shoris/ to vnderproppe the popis chirche: Made by George Ioye, Emdon: Jacob Aurik (vere Antwerp: Catharine van Ruremund), 1534.
- Ieremy the Prophete/ translated into Englisshe: by George Ioye: some tyme felowe of Peter College in Cambridge. The songe of Moses is added in the ende to magnif ye our Lorde for the fallof our Pharao the Bisshop of Rome, (Catharine van Ruremund), Anno. M.D. and .xxxiiii. in the monthe of Maye.
- Dauids Psalter/ diligently and faithfully translated by George Ioye/ with brief Arguments before euery Psalme/ declaringe the effect therof, [Antwerp]: Martyne Emperowr (=Merten de Keyser), 1534.
- An Apologye made by George Ioye to satisfye (if it maye be) w. Tindale: to pourge & defende himself ageinst so many sclaunderouse lyes fayned upon him in Tindals uncheritable and unsober Pystle so well worthye to be prefixed for the Reader to induce him into the understanding of hys new Testament diligently corrected & printed in the yeare of oure lorde .M. CCCCC. and xxxiiij. in Nouember., (Antwerp?), 27 February 1535.
- A compendyouse Somme of the very Christen relygyon: gathered faythfully out of the holy scripture: necessary for all them that rede the olde and new Testament[...] Translated by George Ioye the yere of our lorde. M.D. xxxv. In Septembre, London: John Bydell, 1535.
- A frutefull treatis of Baptyme and the Lordis Souper/ of the vse and effect of them/ of the worthey and vnworthy receyuers of the Souper/ necessary to be knowne of all Christen men/ which yerely receyue the Sacrament, Grunning (vere Antwerp: Catharine van Ruremund), 27 April 1541.
- A very godly defense/ full of lerning/ defending the mariage of Preistes/ gathered by Philip Melanchthon/ & sent vnto the kyng of Englond/ Henry the aight/ tra[n]slated out of latyne into englisshe/ by lewes beuchame, the yere of the Lorde.M.CCCCC.XLI. in Auguste, Lipse: Ubryght Hoff (vere Antwerp: Catharine van Ruremund).
- The defense of the Mariage of Preistes: agenst Steuen Gardiner, Iames Sawtry (vere Antwerp: Catharine van Ruremund), August 1541.
- The exposicion of Daniel the Prophete gathered oute of Philip Melanchton/ Johan Ecolampadius/ Conrade Pellicane & out of Johan Draconite. &c. By George Joye. A prophecye diligently to be noted of al Emprowrs & kinges in these laste dayes, Geneue: G.J. (vere Antwerp, Catharine van Ruremund), 1545.
- A contrarye (to a certayne manis) Consultacion: That Adulterers ought to be punyshed wyth deathe. With the solucions of his argumentes for the contrarye, (London:) George Joye, 1549.

== Further references ==
- Gergely Juhász, "Translating Resurrection. The Importance of the Sadducees' Belief in the Tyndale–Joye Controversy", in Reimund Bieringer, Veronica Koperski & Bianca Lataire (eds.), Resurrection in the New Testament, FS Jan Lambrecht, (Bibliotheca Ephemeridum Theologicarum Lovaniensium 165), Leuven: University Press – Peeters, 2002, pp. 107–121.
