= Merten de Keyser =

French printer and publisher

Merten de Keyser (born Martin Lempereur; died 1536) was a 16th-century French printer and publisher, working mainly in Antwerp. He printed the first complete French and the first complete English Bible translations of several works by English Protestant authors.

== Life ==
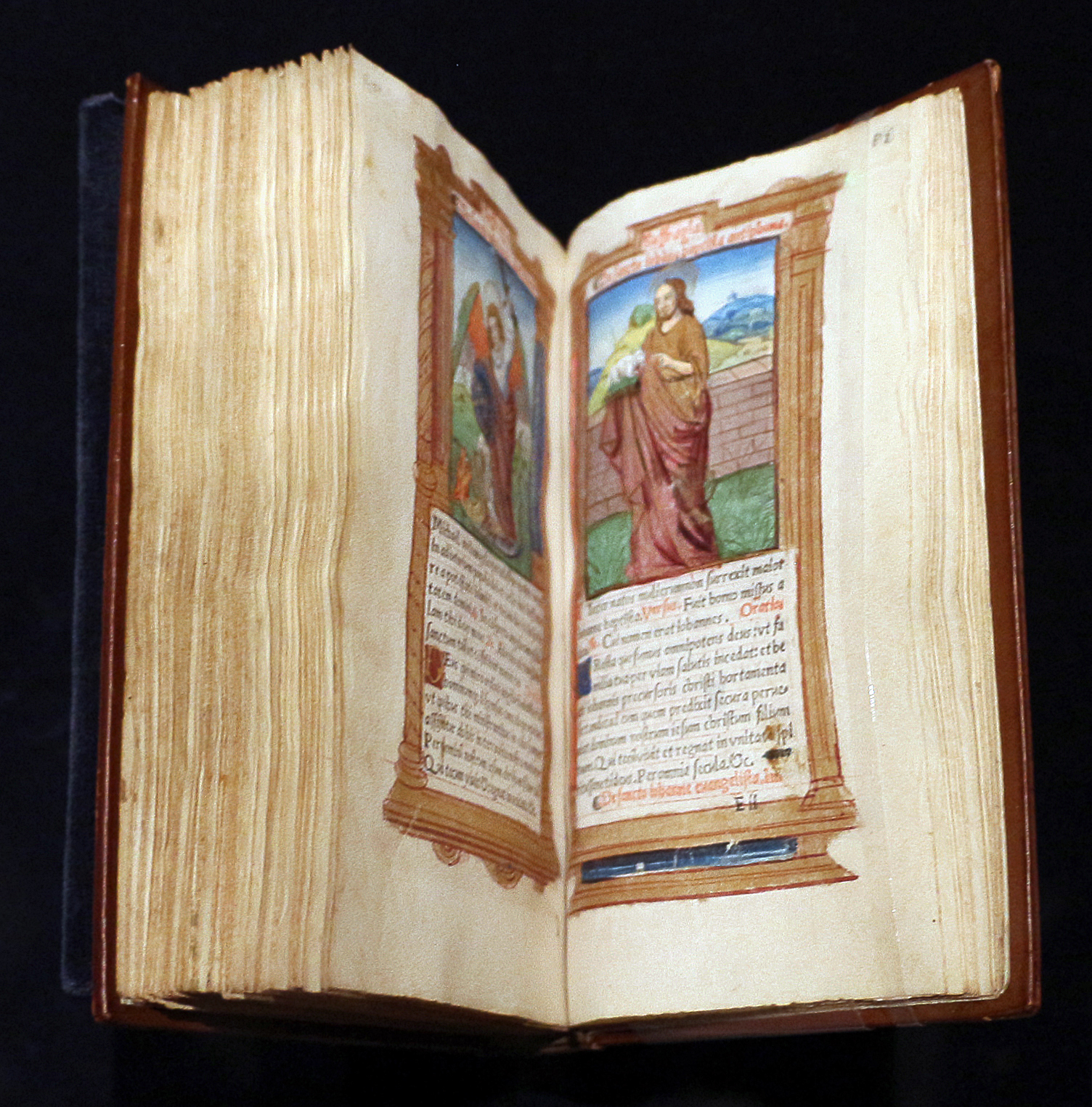
Bible (1510) by Guillaume Le Rouge; Cleveland Museum of Art

Not much is known about his life. He married Françoise La Rouge, the daughter of the Paris printer Guillaume Le Rouge, whose workshop he took over on Le Rouge's death in 1517. When a series of condemnations of evangelical works and a ban on Bible translations were issued in Paris in 1525, he moved to Antwerp.

In his Antwerp publications, he adapted his name to the language of the publication (using Martinus Caesar in the Latin volumes, Merten de Keyser in the Dutch books, and Martyne Emperowr in the English works). He died in Antwerp in 1536. After his death, his widow continued to run the workshop.

== Publications ==
De Keyser issued many works by the French humanist Jacques Lefèvre d'Étaples: his French Psalter (1525), his French Old Testament (1528), his French New Testament (1529, 1531, 1532, 1535) and his complete French Bible (1530 and 1534), the first French Bible ever in print. De Keyser published the second edition of Lefèvre's fivefold Psalter, the Quincuplex Psalterium, which contained the Psalms in five different Latin versions.

His Dutch publications included New Testaments (e.g. Dat nieuwe testament ons Heeren Jesu Christi met alder neersticheyt oversien, ende verduytst in 1525), Psalters, partial biblical translations and other religious works. His printer's device is included in the second complete Dutch Bible, published by his colleague Willem Vorsterman in 1528 in Antwerp, hinting at some co-operation between the two printers working in the same street.

Merten de Keyser was active in the English market, too. In 1528, he published William Tyndale's The obedience of a Christen man, and in 1530 Tyndale's The practyse of Prelates as well as Tyndale's translation of the Pentateuch. A year later (1531) he issued Tyndale's Exposition of the fyrste Epistle of seynt Ihon, George Joye's translation of Isaiah, and Tyndale's translation of Jonah, the latter two intended as a twin-publication. Thomas Abell's Invicta Veritas, criticising Henry VIII's divorce, also saw the light of day in the Merten de Keyser workshop in 1532.

In 1533, he posthumously printed John Frith's answer to Thomas More, which Frith composed while imprisoned in the Tower of London. In 1534, De Keyser printed the second, revised edition of Tyndale's New Testament as well as Joye's fresh edition of the Davids Psalter based on Zwingli's Latin Psalter, and Joye's translation of the book of Jeremiah. These Old Testament translations were the first English translations of these biblical books ever in print. Furthermore, according to the discovery of Guido Latré in 1997, it was also Merten de Keyser who printed the first complete English Bible, the Coverdale Bible.

Among de Keyser's Latin publications, we find Robert Estienne's Latin Bible (e.g. in 1534), a scholarly revision of the Vulgate based on various ancient manuscripts. De Keyser also issued reprints of Erasmus's Latin translation of the New Testament.

De Keyser also published at least one book in Leuven in 1532.
