= Statue of William Tyndale =

Bronze statue in London

Coordinates: 51.5051°N 0.1236°W

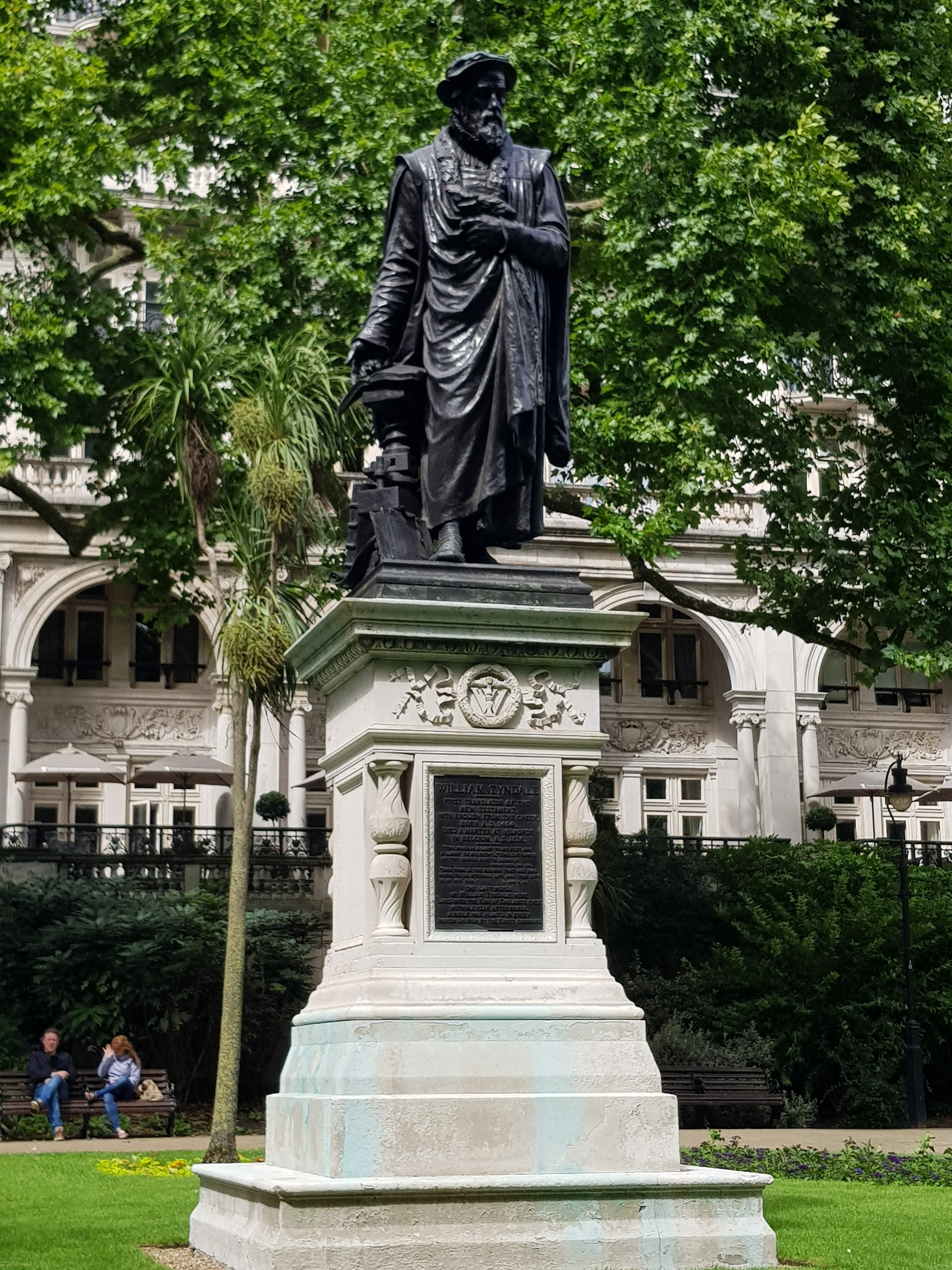
- Statue of William Tyndale, in London
- Artist: Joseph Edgar Boehm
- Completion date: 1884
- Subject: William Tyndale
- Location: London

Listed Building – Grade II
- Official name: Statue of William Tyndale
- Designated: 24 February 1958
- Reference no.: 1357350

The Statue of William Tyndale is a Grade II listed statue within the Victoria Embankment Gardens in London.

The monument celebrates William Tyndale, a bible scholar who was persecuted in his attempts to make readily available an English translation of the bible, a mission which the society believed mirrored their own aims. Tyndale was eventually tried for heresy and sentenced to death for his work. His last words were "Lord, open the king of England's eyes", and English bibles would become available in every parish church by order of the king shortly after his death. The King James Bible makes significant use of Tyndale's work.

The monument is by Joseph Edgar Boehm, unveiled in 1884 by Lord Shaftesbury. A bronze statue upon a Portland stone pedestal, Tyndale is shown with his right hand on his translation of the New Testament, that rests on a printing press of similar design to one which Tyndale may have used while in exile in Antwerp. The monument was dedicated by the British and Foreign Bible Society to mark their 80th anniversary, as well as possibly the 400th of Tyndale's birth, despite this date being disputed.

A portrait which hangs in the dining hall of Hertford College, Oxford, is said to have served as the inspiration for the depiction seen in Victoria Embankment Gardens.
