= Arnold Wathen Robinson =

British stained glass artist

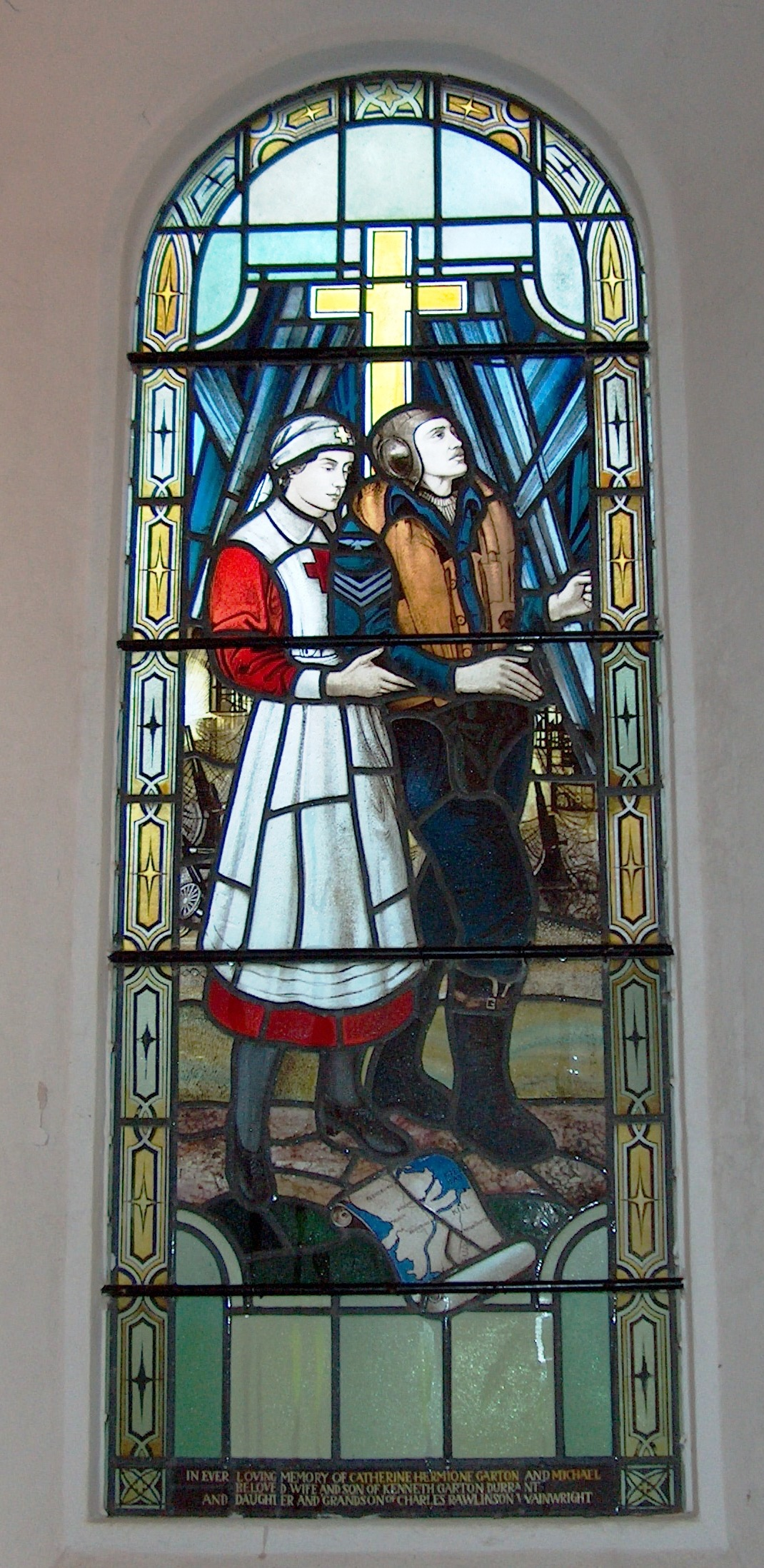
- Window in St Mary’s Church Christon.
- Born: 1888; Barton Regis. Gloucestershire
- Died: 1955 (aged 66–67)
- Education: Christopher Whall.
- Known for: Stained Glass

Arnold Wathen Robinson RWA, FMGP (1888–1955) was an English stained-glass artist. Although Robinson's family, on the paternal and maternal side were involved in local government, he sought a career as a stained-glass artist. During World War I he initially enlisted in the Artists Rifles, and was then released from military service to manage a shell factory. Three of his four younger brothers were to be killed in the Great War.

Robinson attended Clifton College and Royal West of England Academy, followed by an apprenticeship with Christopher Whall. Through his relationship with Joseph Bell & Son, Robinson received commissions for work, became a director at the firm and later became owner. He became part-owner of the flagging Bristol Guild of Applied Art, which then became a well-reputed and successful guild in Bristol.

== Early life and studies ==
Robinson was born on 17 December 1888, and his birth was registered in January 1889 in Barton Regis, Gloucestershire. He was the son of Kossuth Robinson and Mary Selina Wathen Robinson who lived in the Westbury area of Bristol until 1899. Then they moved to a newly built house in the Sneyd Park area. Kossuth Robinson was a justice of the peace for the County of Gloucestershire and at one time had kept a 100-acre farm. The family were reasonably well off and when he died on 9 February 1928 he left an estate worth some £27,000. Kossuth Robinson's father, Elisha Smith Robinson, had also been a justice of the peace as had his wife's adopted father Sir Charles Wathen. Elisha Smith Robinson was the Mayor of Bristol in 1866.

== World War I ==
Arnold Wathen Robinson was the eldest of five sons, and three of his brothers were to be killed in the Great War. (Note: Second Lieutenant Edward Colston Robinson served in the 8th Somerset Light Infantry and was killed in France on 26 September 1915 aged 21 years. He is remembered in panel 38 and 39 of the Loos Memorial. Lance Corporal Clifford Kossuth Robinson of the Canterbury Mounted Rifles, New Zealand Expeditionary Force died in Malta on 8 December 1915 aged 26 years and is buried in the Pieta Military Cemetery. He had been fighting in the Dardanelles. Before enrolling he had been training as a Chartered Accountant. Lieutenant Geoffrey Wathen Robinson served with the 10th Gloucestershire Regiment and was killed in France on 25 September 1915. He is buried in St Mary’s A.D.S. Cemetery in Haisnes, with the gravestone inscription: "I THANK MY GOD UPON EVERY REMEMBRANCE OF YOU". Robinson’s other brother, Gilbert Crescens, served with the provost marshal in Bangalore as a volunteer. He had been working as a forestry officer in Madras.) Arnold himself had joined the Artists Rifles but was released from military service provided he took up war work. On release from the Army, Arnold became the manager of a shell factory but still managed to go on making stained glass. In the Second World War Arnold worked as an Air Raid Warden during the blitzes that Bristol endured.

== Education ==
Robinson was educated at Clifton College and was to become an Academician of the Royal West of England Academy (RWA).

== Career ==
He started his working life serving as an apprentice to Christopher Whall from 1906 to 1912 and it was at Whall's studio that he was to meet and befriend Karl Parsons and Edward Woore. In around 1912 he started to work with the Glass House in Fulham, working with amongst others Edward Woore. Most of his early commissions were for churches and institutions in Bristol, where the Robinson family were well known and influential. In particular, and working with Woore, he undertook commissions for the firm Joseph Bell and Sons. (Note: From The Buildings of England. Somerset: North and Bristol.: "The firm of Bell & Son, the largest local producer, had followed Kempe’s silvery style until Arnold Robinson, its chief designer after the First World War, steered a new course. The result can be seen in the splendid collection of smoky and mottled glass at St Alban, Westbury Park, Bristol (1919 onward), and in smaller quantities elsewhere.")

Robinson became a director of the Bristol firm of Joseph Bell & Son, which carried out stained glass work for many West Country churches. Especially well known in Bristol are the Civil Defence windows that Arnold Robinson designed for Bristol Cathedral and his Bunyan and Tyndale windows in Tyndale Baptist Church. Joseph Bell & Son was initially established by Joseph Bell (1810–1895) and then run by his son, Frederick Henry Bell (1847–1899) and grandson, Frederick George Bell (1878–1967) until 1923 when it was sold to Arnold Robinson.

Arnold Robinson was also heavily involved with the Bristol Guild of Applied Art. Established in 1908 by followers of William Morris's Arts and Crafts creed, the Bristol Guild of Applied Art was a co-operative of skilled workers offering hand-crafted work to replace mass-produced goods, improving the relationship between the worker and his work. Initially the guild was unsuccessful. In 1918 it was bought as a business by three private owners, including Arnold Robinson; It was to become one of Bristol's most successful shops and the Guild Gallery on the shop's second floor an important Arts centre.

== Personal life ==
Arnold married Constance Burgess in 1925. They had three children, Daphne, Cecily and Geoffrey. Geoffrey followed in his father's footsteps as a stained glass artist. After his death in 1955 Arnold's son, Geoffrey took over the firm in 1959 until his retirement in 1996. (Note: Examples of Geoffrey Robinson's work can be seen in the Church of St Mary in Nash near Newport ("the Presentation of Christ in the Temple"), the Church of St Mary in Magor, Monmouthshire ("The Annunciation"), the Church of St Tysoi in Llansoy, also in Monmouthshire ("God’s Promise to Noah") and the Church of St Mary in Herbrandston in Pembrokeshire ("The Annunciation" and "Christ as the Tree of Life").)
