= John Ashwell =

- Occupation: Prior

John Ashwell (died 1541), was the prior of Newnham Abbey, in Bedfordshire.

Ashwell was best known for his opposition to the principles of the Reformation, was a graduate of Cambridge University. In 1504 it is probable that Ashwell, who was then a bachelor of divinity, became rector of Mistley in Essex, and held in subsequent years the benefices of Littlebury and Halstead in the same county. In 1515 he was appointed chaplain to Lord Abergavenny's troops in France (Brewer's Letters of Henry VIII, ii. part i. 137), and six years later a prebendal stall in St. Paul's Cathedral was conferred upon him.

He became prior of Newnham Abbey about 1527. In the same year he addressed a secret letter, written partly in Latin and partly in English, to John Longland, the Bishop of Lincoln, bitterly complaining of the heretical opinions held by George Joye, a bold advocate of Lutheranism, with whom he had lived on terms of great intimacy. The epistle unhappily fell into Joye's hands, and the reformer withdrew to Strasburg to escape the effects of the bishop's displeasure.

== Denunciation of George Joye ==
There, however, he published Ashwell's letter, together with an elaborate reply to all the charges preferred against him. The pamphlet, of which very few copies are now extant, bears the title The Letter whyche Johan Ashwell, Priour of Newnham Abbey besydes Bedforde, sente secretly to the Byshope of Lyncolne in the yeare of our Lord MDXXVII. Where in the sayde Priour accuseth George Joye, that tyme beyng fellow of Peter College in Cambridge of fower opinions; with the Answere of the sayde George unto the same opinions. The colophon runs: At Strazburge 10 daye of June. Thys lytell boke be delyvered to Johan Ashwell at Newnham Abbey besyde Bedforde with spede.

One of the most singular passages in the book is Ashwell's earnest entreaty to the bishop that no creature maye know that I or any of mine do shew you of these thinges, for then I shal leusse the favor of many in my contree — a passage clearly showing that the Reformation in England was eagerly expected by the prior's neighbours. A second edition of the pamphlet was published by Joye at Antwerp in 1531. Ashwell apparently somewhat modified his opinions with the times, and in 1534 he was among the first to take the oath of supremacy to Henry VIII as head of the church. But he appears to have resigned the post of prior of Newnham before 1539, when the monasteries were finally dissolved.

== Death ==
His death took place shortly before 23 August 1541, when the prebendal stall in St. Paul's Cathedral, which he had held for twenty years, was declared vacant and filled up.
