= Tyndale Baptist Church =

Baptist church in Bristol, England

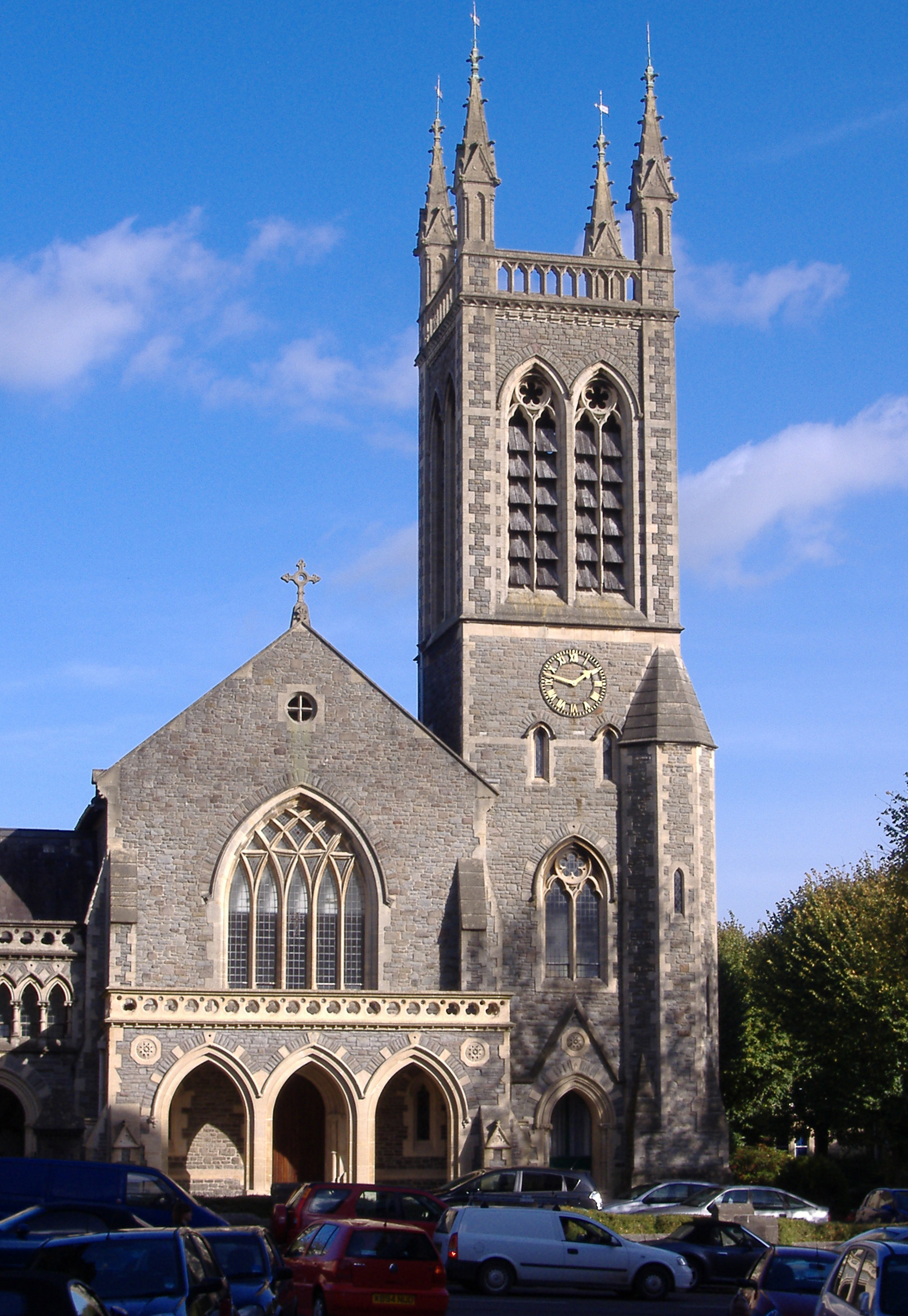

- Location within Bristol

General information
- Location: Bristol, England
- Coordinates: 51.46547°N 2.61009°W
- Completed: 1869

Tyndale Baptist Church is a Baptist church in Whiteladies Road, Redland, in Bristol, England.

The church was founded in 1869, following an initiative by Broadmead Baptist Church to establish a church to serve the growing population of Redland. Funds to build the new church were raised by a committee chaired by E. S. Robinson, founder of the paper and packaging business E. S. & A. Robinson, and mayor of Bristol in 1866. The first minister was the Revd Richard Glover (1837–1919), President of the Baptist Union in 1884 and active in promoting the work of the Baptist Missionary Society. Glover served the church until 1911.

Several members of the church were prominent in Bristol public life. The first Lord Mayor of Bristol in 1899, Sir Herbert Ashman, was baptized by Glover. Edward Robinson, a son of E. S. Robinson, was Lord Mayor in 1908. Charles Townsend, M.P. for Bristol North from 1892 to 1895, was church secretary for more than 20 years.

== Stained glass windows ==
The church was bombed in the Bristol Blitz in 1941. It was rebuilt and reopened in 1955. The new church houses some of the best work of the stained glass artist Arnold Robinson, grandson of E. S. Robinson. The finest windows are at each end of the transept, one depicting the Pilgrim's Progress of John Bunyan, and the other the life of William Tyndale.
