= Bristol Guild of Applied Art =

Department store on Park Street, Bristol, England (1908–2024)

Coordinates: 51°27′19″N 2°36′11″W

- Industry: Retailing
- Founded: 1908
- Defunct: 2024
- Headquarters: Bristol, England
- Area served: West Country
- Key people: Ken Stradling (Chairman); Mike Cannings (Managing Director)
- Products: Arts and Crafts Movement
- Website: bristolguild.co.uk

The Bristol Guild of Applied Art, more commonly referred to within Bristol as simply The Guild, was a privately held department store on Bristol's Park Street in the UK. Founded in 1908, the Guild was inspired by the philosophy of William Morris, and originally offered a place for artists and craftsmen to come together, learn from each other and sell their wares. It continued to showcase artists both local and foreign, while also operating as a more conventional small department store until its closure in 2024.

== History ==
The Guild was founded in 1908 as a guild in the true sense, a co-operative for local craftsmen to organise, work, learn and sell their handiwork. It was built on the principles behind William Morris's Arts and Crafts Movement and lasted in that form until 1918, when the enterprise folded. It was bought out by three local businessmen and turned into a fully commercial venture, importing glass from Sweden and crystal and pottery from elsewhere in the United Kingdom. Park Street was home of the Guild throughout its existence, originally at 75 Park Street and from 1933 at 68 Park Street. Since the 1940s, the Guild has survived the Bristol Blitz bombings in World War II and a Provisional IRA attack in 1974.

== Modern times ==
Since its inception the Guild has offered exhibitions of particular artists and craftspeople, both established names and newcomers, including Gillian Lowndes and Dan Arbeit, at its second floor public gallery. While he was a student at Bristol University, the Guild was a source of fascination and inspiration for the writer John Metcalf. In 2008, an extensive programme of refurbishment department by department, with a major overhaul of the layout and café began. In 2016 the Guild ceased to use the westernmost of the buildings it had previously occupied.

In May 2024 the Guild announced that it would close on 30 May.
