= Leonard Cox =

English humanist, author and scholar

Leonard Cox (or Coxe) (c. 1495 – c. 1549) was an English humanist, author of the first book in English on rhetoric. He was a scholar of international reputation who found patronage in Poland, and was friend of Erasmus and Melanchthon. He was known to contemporaries as a grammarian, rhetorician, poet, and preacher, and was skilled in the modern as well as the classical languages.

== Life ==
He matriculated at Tübingen in 1514, where he was a student of Johann Stöffler. He spent two periods at the University of Kraków (1518 to 1520 and 1525 to 1527), where he lectured on classical authors; and as a schoolmaster (in 1520 at Levoča, a position he obtained with the help of Johann Henckel, and in 1521 at Košice, both now in Slovakia). Carpenter takes a March 1519 reference to Leonard Cox in transit from Tournai to Antwerp to be him. John Leland wrote a Latin poem praising Cox, including references suggesting he had been at Paris and Prague.

His patrons in Poland included Krzysztof Szydłowiecki. In 1527 Cox had the opportunity to participate in a high-profile exchange of open letters, from Martin Luther to King Henry VIII. He printed the last two parts of the correspondence, adding an introduction glorifying Szydłowiecki, as well as a flattering poem by Stanislaus Hosius. Szydłowiecki and Jan Łaski gave Cox his introduction to Erasmus; he several times lectured on the De copia. Another patron was Piotr Tomicki. Cox had dedicated a 1518 book (an oration praising the university) to Justus Ludovicus Decius (Jost Ludwig Dietz) from Alsace, who had been in Kraków from 1505.

He graduated B.A. at the University of Cambridge on a visit to England 1526-7. He was incorporated as B.A. at Oxford on 19 February 1530, and he also supplicated that university for the degree of M.A. Hugh Cook Faringdon, abbot of Reading, appointed him master of the grammar school in Reading, Berkshire and associated with Reading Abbey, by 1530. Anthony Wood relates that Cox supported John Frith when he was apprehended as a vagabond at Reading. Faringdon was executed in 1539, and Cox went to Caerleon where he kept a school. He had a son, Francis, D.D., of New College, Oxford.

He was succeeded in the mastership of Reading school by Leonard Bilson in 1546.

== The Art or Crafte of Rhetoryke ==
He was author of The Art or Crafte of Rhetoryke, first edition 1524; and also London (Robert Redman), 1532. It was reprinted in 1899, edited by Frederick Ives Carpenter, and a facsimile edition appeared in 1977. This work is translated from part of Melanchthon's Institutiones Rhetoricae, in a pirated edition of 1521. It covers on the section on inventio. This makes it only a partial rendering of the five-fold scheme of classical rhetoric. The work is recognised as the first rhetoric book in English, and apparently was intended for a general readership; but there are aspects more clearly intended for the use of lawyers. On the other hand, it has been described as intended as a schoolbook; and Brian Vickers specifies that it was designed for use in a grammar school.

== Other works ==
He edited the Venatio of Adriano di Castello (1524). He translated from Greek into Latin Marcus Eremita de Lege et Spiritu, and from Latin into English Erasmus's Paraphrase of the Epistle to Titus, which in 1534 he asked the printer Robert Toy to convey to Thomas Cromwell, at a time when Cox hoped for Cromwell's influence to secure a move the free school at Bristol; it appeared again in 1549, with a dedication to John Hales, clerk of the hanaper. Commentaries upon Will. Lily's Construction of the eight parts of Speech, 1540 was a version of William Lilye's basic Latin grammar, again dedicated to Cromwell. He also wrote verses prefixed to the publications of others, including the Hyperaspistes of Erasmus and the French grammar of John Palsgrave.
