= Thomas Abel (martyr) =

English Roman Catholic priest and martyr

Blessed Thomas Abell

Martyr
- Born: ca. 1497 unknown
- Died: 30 July 1540 (aged 42 - 43); Smithfield, London, England
- Venerated in: Roman Catholic Church
- Beatified: 29 December 1886, Rome, Italy, by Pope Leo XIII
- Feast: 4 May, 30 July
- Patronage: Oxford Gregorian Chant Society

Thomas Abel (or Abell) (ca. 1497 – 30 July 1540) was an English priest who was martyred during the reign of Henry VIII. The place and date of his birth are unknown.

He was educated at Oxford, where in 1516 he took the degree of Master of Arts, and subsequently acquired a doctorate in theology. He entered the service of Queen Catherine as her chaplain some time before 1528 and appears to have taught the queen modern languages and music. Catherine sent him to Spain in 1528 to the emperor Charles V on a mission relating to the proposed divorce. On his return she presented him with the parochial benefice of Bradwell, in Essex, and he remained to the last a staunch supporter of the unfortunate queen in the case of the validity of her marriage with Henry VIII.

In 1532, he published his Invicta veritas. An answere, That by no manner of law, it may be lawfull for the most noble King of England, King Henry the eight to be divorced from the queens grace, his lawfull and very wife. B.L.. Abel's treatise was printed by Merten de Keyser in Antwerp with the fictitious pressmark of Luneberge, to avoid suspicion. The work contained an answer to the numerous tracts supporting Henry's ecclesiastical claims. The king bought up copies of the book in order to destroy them.

For this he was thrown into the Beauchamp Tower in the Tower of London, and after a year's liberation again imprisoned, in December 1533, on the charges of disseminating the prophecies of the Maid of Kent, encouraging the queen "obstinately to persist in her wilful opinion against the same divorce and separation", and maintaining her right to the title of queen. He was kept in close confinement until his execution at Smithfield, two days after the execution of Thomas Cromwell. There is still to be seen on the wall of his prison in the Tower of London a rebus consisting of the symbol of a bell with an A upon it and the name Thomas above, which he carved during his confinement. There is extant a very pious Latin letter written by him to a fellow-martyr, and another to Cromwell, begging for some slight mitigation of his "close prison"; "license to go to church and say Mass here within the Tower and for to lie in some house upon the Green". It is signed "by your daily bedeman, Thomas Abell, priest".

His act of attainder states that he and three others "have most traitorously adhered themselves unto the bishop of Rome, being a common enemy unto your Majesty and this your Realm, refusing your Highness to be our and their Supreme Head of this your Realm of England". Abel was sentenced to "be drawn on a hurdle to the place of execution, there to be hanged, cut down alive, your members to be cut off and cast in the fire, your bowels burnt before your eyes, your head smitten off, your body to be quartered at the King's will, and God have mercy on your soul."

== Veneration ==
Thomas Abel was beatified by Pope Leo XIII as one of a group of fifty-four English Martyrs on 29 December 1886.

He is a patron of the Oxford Gregorian Chant Society, a student society of Oxford University.
