= The Obedience of a Christian Man =

1528 book by William Tyndale

The Obedience of a Christen man, and how Christen rulers ought to govern, wherein also (if thou mark diligently) thou shalt find eyes to perceive the crafty convience of all iugglers. is a 1528 book by the English Protestant author William Tyndale. The spelling of this title is now commonly modernized and abbreviated to The Obedience of a Christian Man. It was first published by Merten de Keyser in Antwerp, and is best known for advocating Caesaropapism: the ideology that the King of a country was the head of that country's church, rather than the Holy See, and to be the first instance, in the English language at any rate, of advocating the divine right of kings, a concept mistakenly attributed to the Catholic Church.

It is believed that the book greatly influenced Henry VIII's decision in declaring the Act of Supremacy, by which he became Supreme Head of the Church of England, in 1534. Tyndale's opposition to Henry's divorce from Catherine of Aragon earned him the king's enmity, but when Tyndale was arrested by the Roman Catholic authorities in Antwerp in 1535, Henry's chief minister Thomas Cromwell attempted unsuccessfully to intervene on his behalf. Tyndale was executed for heresy the following year.

== The text ==
The Obedience of a Christian Man (from here on abbreviated as Obedience) was first printed in Antwerp on October 2, 1528 (viii). Despite being officially banned, Obedience was still widely read throughout England and, later on, was even mentioned in the works of Shakespeare (xxvii). Anne Boleyn, (later Henry VIII's second wife) owned a copy. As Henry was trying to obtain permission from the Pope to divorce his first wife, Catherine of Aragon, Anne asked Henry to read Obedience. Afterward, Henry exclaimed, "This is a book for me and all kings to read" (xxiv).

Obedience is divided into five overall sections. The first two are preliminary introductions: the first introduces Tyndale's central concept of experiencing God through the reading of scripture; the second discusses the church's disobedience (of God) in teaching ecclesiastical law rather than scripture. The book proper contains three overall topics: God's laws of obedience, how one should obey and rule in life (addressed to all of English society), and a discussion on the literal interpretation of scripture. Throughout the text, Tyndale also discusses the intrusion into daily life, on both local and national levels by the church and, especially, the Pope, and how the church actively distorts scripture to fulfill its own needs.

The tone of Obedience is low-key, despite containing radical ideology. For the first time, the concept of the supreme authority of the Bible in church is combined with the supreme authority of the king in state (the latter is what inspired Henry VIII). Although Tyndale complains about the lack of scripture in English life, his text features prose inspired by scripture and is abundant with direct quotes and references from the New Testament. He documents the origin of the direct quotes, but not his references, many of which would not have been recognized by the average person who read an original edition of Obedience, then or now.

=== Advocacy for an English-language Bible ===
"How can we whet God's Word (that is put into practice, use and exercise) upon our children and household, when we are violently kept from it and know it not?" (16). Tyndale accuses the church of keeping the people away from, and claiming all authority over, scripture. He believes that the reading of scripture directly reveals the power of God to the individual, without any need of an intermediary, like a priest. One of his principal concerns revisited throughout the text is the availability of an English-language Bible for the common people to read. Latin was, at the time, the official language of the church: All services and ceremonies were conducted in Latin, and as a result, the Bible too was only available in Latin. In fact, the church discouraged people from reading the Bible at all. Tyndale criticizes the church for allowing the English people to be ignorant of the Bible, and replacing the teaching of scripture with ceremonies or ritual superstition. "On the holy days which were ordained to preach God's word, set up long ceremonies, long matins, long masses and long evensongs, and all in Latin that they understand not, and roll them in darkness, that ye may lead them whither ye will" (90). According to Tyndale, church authorities adduce that a man must have a pure and quiet mind to read and fully comprehend scripture, and that the average man is too encumbered with worldly matters to do so. Tyndale counters this argument stating no one is as occupied with worldly matters as the church. Authorities also postulate that if every man were able to read scripture, every man would interpret it for himself, leading to widespread non-conformity and insurrection. Tyndale considers this claim to be ridiculous. As an example in the text, Tyndale defends Martin Luther against the published criticisms of Thomas More, who accused Luther of being the impetus of the German Peasants' War (1524–1525).

Tyndale asks if the church is so concerned about Biblical misinterpretation, why does it not teach scripture? Would teaching scripture be more effective if every man possessed a copy of the Bible from which he could study? Tyndale asserts the true reason the church does not provide scripture in English is that the people might determine how the church manipulates scripture to its own benefit: that, in fact, the church does not practice what it preaches. Tyndale goes as far as to claim the church is as interested in scripture as "the Turks" (17). He states that Jesus had commanded the people to read scripture for themselves so they would know if "false prophets" (22) were trying to deceive them and reminds us that the apostles preached in local languages, and therefore, as a matter of custom, the English people should receive scripture in English.

Tyndale asks if (Saint) Jerome could translate scripture into his own language, why not the English people? Tyndale says the church authorities feel that English is "rude" (19), i.e., undeveloped. He responds by asking if indeed did not God "make the English tongue?" (24), and reminds us that an earlier English monarch, King Athelstan, had scripture translated into Old English. He also states that God Himself provided His law to the Israelites in Hebrew. Tyndale quotes Paul from scripture, "And yet Paul […] forbiddeth to speak in the church or congregation save in the tongue that all understand" (90).

=== English society realigned to coincide with biblical law ===
"Who slew the prophets? Who slew Christ? Who slew his Apostles? Who the martyrs and all the righteous that ever were slain? The kings and the temporal sword at the request of the false prophets" (98).

As indicated by its title, the central theme of Obedience is obedience, as designated by scripture onto all levels of English society. The first three sections discuss obedience as it applies to the family: Tyndale says that wives must be subordinate to their husbands, always, and that a "grudge against husband is a grudge against God" (34), and husbands are to help their wives overcome their "infirmities" (61). Servants must be obedient to their masters, not as sycophants, but as servants of Christ, as they are doing the will of God, and in return, their masters must be nurturing, "that they [servants] may see in Christ a cause why they ought lovingly to obey" (61).

More significantly, in the section titled, "The Obedience of Subjects unto Kings, Princes and Rulers," Tyndale states that the "powers that be" (36) are powers ordained by God, and that resistance to earthly authority is resistance to God's authority, but the bishops have usurped earthly authority from secular rulers, and therefore, they must be resisted, as God has appointed the kings, princes, and other secular leaders as his representatives on earth. He reiterates that whoever resists the king resists God, whether they are layman or clergy: "The higher powers are the temporal king and princes unto whom God hath given the sword to punish whosoever sinneth" (40–41). In "The Duty of Kings and of the Judges and Officers," Tyndale says that the people, the subjects of the English kingdom, belong to God, and not the king. All men, including the king, must perform their earthly duties or answer to God; but the king is controlled by the Pope, creating a situation for like that of living in two nations, not one; that split between church and state has allowed the church to intervene at every level of English society. Tyndale reminds us that the Pope claims to be authorized by the New Testament; a claim first challenged by, as Tyndale credits, Martin Luther.

Within Tyndale's political theories are the conceptual emergence of the modern state and nationalism. He says the state should not be divided into the monarchy and the church, with each fighting for supremacy, although he is not what is termed an "Erastian": someone who believes that the church should be subordinate to the state. But Tyndale does not call for sedition. In Tyndale's political system, the king is supreme in the state: "To preach God's Word is too much for half a man. And to minister a temporal kingdom is too much for half a man also. Either other requireth an [sic] whole man" (68). The king is to enforce the law as it is written in scripture. The king is not more important than the church: he is its facilitator and supreme authority. The king is to ensure that ministers are preaching properly and to maintain the integrity of the church. Tyndale states that it is the king's responsibility to serve others, and not for others to serve him, but the bishops have corrupted kings into considering otherwise. The king is required to swear his allegiance to the bishops and the Pope, which causes Tyndale to ask, "How hath the Pope the such temporal authority over king and emperor?" (124).

"Let the temporal power to whom God hath given the sword to take vengeance, look or ever that they leap, and see what they do. Let the causes be disputed before them, and let him that is accused have room to answer for himself" (106). Tyndale restates the king's authority over the kingdom, that the king "is ordained to take vengeance and hath a sword in his hand and not peacock's feathers. Fear him therefore and look on him as thou wouldest look on a sharp sword that hanged over thy head by an [sic] hair" (54–55). If the king is an evil king, he is evil because God has deemed it so. "And whatsoever is done unto us by them, that doeth God, be it good or bad" (55). Resisting an evil king is as evil as a child resisting his parents. If the people overthrow their king, a new, non-ordained king will replace him.

Tyndale then asks what to do with the Pope's false authority. He accuses the Pope (then Clement VII) of inverting God's law: making what is a sin not, and that which is not a sin, sin. The Pope has unrightfully taken the authority to damn people to purgatory. "How hath he authority above God's laws and to command the angels, the saints and God himself?" (124). Tyndale asks the church, "Who gave the Pope the authority to command God to damn people?" Tyndale states that God commanded the clergy to bless the people, and the church asks God to damn them. "Paul also in many things which God had made free, gave pure and faithful counsel without tangling of any man's conscience and without all manner commanding under pain of cursing, pain of excommunication, pain of heresy, pain of burning, pain of deadly sin, pain of hell and pain of damnation" (77).

=== Criticisms of the Church ===
"Make themselves holier than the lay people and take so great lands and goods" (112).

In his third argument, Tyndale lists the abuses of the common people by the church. Tyndale accuses the church of being more concerned with performing ceremonies than living by the laws set by Christ in scripture. In terms of sacraments, like other Protestant reformers, Tyndale believes that baptism and the Eucharist are the only true sacraments, as both were performed by Christ in the New Testament (227). Tyndale feels that the church should preach rather than perform superstitious ceremonies, like confession: "Moreover if any man have sinned yet if he repent and believe the promise, we are sure by God's word that he is loosed and forgiven in Christ" (124). In other words, acknowledge your sins to God. Priests should only preach and provide counseling, as they are not a mediator between the people and God. The clergy are only representatives of Christ, not Christ Himself. Tyndale, like Luther, believes that every Christian has a direct relationship with God; that a Christian's own salvation is within him. Only prayer can bring true faith. "Paul in every epistle warneth us that we put no trust in works, and to beware of persuasions or arguments of man's wisdom, of superstitiousness, of ceremonies of popeholiness and of all manner disguising. And exhorteth us to cleave fast onto the naked and pure word of God" (131).

Tyndale also condemns the church for creating and enforcing ecclesiastical law rather than teaching God's law, as it is written in scripture. As a result of ecclesiastical law, the church separates itself from the people it is supposed to serve. According to Tyndale, the New Testament, not church doctrine, contains all the laws by which a good Christian should abide. "[O]ne king, one law, is God's ordinance in every realm" (96). Tyndale states that, ironically, the church forbids that which Jesus promoted and promotes that which Jesus forbade. Unfortunately, Tyndale does not provide any specific examples to support this claim (however obvious it may appear), and this lack of evidence weakens the potential strength of his argument, even if we consider the historical context in which this argument was originally made.

"They preach it were better for thee to eat flesh on Good Friday than to hate thy neighbor: but let any man eat flesh but on a Sunday or break any other tradition of theirs, and he shall be bound and not loosed, till he have paid the utmost farthing, other with shame most vile or death most cruel, but hate thy neighbor as much as thou wilt and thou shalt have no rebuke of them, yea rob him, murder him, and then come to them and welcome" (99).

Tyndale denies the authority and infallibility of the Pope (and, indirectly, attacks the church hierarchy, too): according to Tyndale's interpretation of scripture, the foundation of the church is the apostle Peter's faith, not himself. Peter's successor has no authority other than to preach the gospel: "Our hypocrites boast themselves of the authority of Peter and of Paul and the other Apostles, clean contrary unto the deeds and doctrine of Peter, Paul and of all the other Apostles" (104). As Christians, Tyndale says, all are equal in the eyes of God, including the clergy. The clergy may have a special calling as preachers, but they are not superior to any other Christian: "So it was in the manner to call Peter chief of the Apostles for his singular activity and boldness, and not that he should be lord over his brethren contrary to his own doctrine" (76).
