= Gillian Lowndes =

English ceramics sculptor

Gillian Lowndes (19 June 1936 – 2 October 2010) was an English ceramics sculptor.

Born in West Kirby, Cheshire in 1936, she spent much of her childhood in British India. She studied at the Central School of Arts and Crafts beginning in 1957 and spent a year at L'École des Beaux-Arts in Paris in 1960. In the early 1970s she travelled to Nigeria with her husband, Ian Auld, a trip that would prove to be influential in her subsequent work. From 1975 until the early 1990s, she taught part-time at Camberwell College of Arts and Central Saint Martins College of Art and Design.

== Work and influences ==
Since the early 1960s and 70s her work has challenged the traditional notions surrounding the form of a vessel and fine art. Through her non-traditional experimental methods of incorporating found objects and materials such as wire and various objects from found in everyday life into her ceramic work, she continually challenges the orthodox world of pure ceramics.

Her mixed-media sculptures have been referred to as bricolage, or sculptures that use found objects to construct new meaning. "Bricolage sculpture converts the inertia and exhaustion of found materials into new conduits of meaning…the idea of a Bricolage image…depends on the use of the found object wrenched from its original context, used as visual or tactile element but stripped of all but residual meaning". "Lowndes is keenly aware of the periodically changing objects that have furnished [her house] over time, and admits to a particular fondness for the usually taken for granted things that surround us in contemporary life: bulldog clips, can openers, forks, and pliers."

Lowndes' affinity and approach to basic, used materials and their inherent materiality calls to mind Arte Povera. "The found materials [Lowndes employs] are poor, low-status ones – old bricks, clinker, granite clippings, mild steel strip, cheap industrially made cups and tiles." Povera artists explore the relationship between art and life through the use of such everyday materials in contrast to "quasi-precious" ones like oil paint or marble that are traditionally used in "fine art." These materials also imply issues pertaining to class and the differentiation between "high" and "low" art. However, Arte Povera "denotes not an impoverished art, but an art made without restraints, a laboratory situation in which a theoretical basis was rejected in favor of a complete openness towards materials and processes."

Lowndes' approach and experimentation with form and materials is much like that of the Process Artists of the 1960s as well. Lowndes believes that "materials are the source of the ideas as well as their expression." Lowndes said of her own work that "...it is the methods and materials that produce the ideas, not the other way round. The choice of materials and the assemblage of pieces lead her towards the object and this process gives her work a strangeness that is visually rich, yet her work is still rooted with the ceramic process and material."

Lowndes used many different combinations and amalgamations of clay from fiberglass dipped in liquid porcelain slip to Egyptian paste in her work. Lowndes would often bury work made of Egyptian paste in sand during the firing using a saggar. After the initial firing she would then smash the pieces with a hammer and reassemble them with ceramic mortar or Nichrome wire. Cups and tiles are added with extra glaze and act as "an affectionate backward glance at the pottery traditions (that of the Leach tradition) of form and technique from which Lowndes emerged." Through the firing process, her work goes through odd, curious metamorphosis. When the work is finished, the fusion of the disparate parts rarely resembles the original piece with which she began.

Previously, Lowndes had already possessed an affinity towards ethnographic objects. Ethnography is an anthropologic description of individual cultures and "human social phenomena". Her visit to Nigeria codified her curiosity in the ethnographic aspects surrounding certain objects. However, she wasn't particularly drawn to the Nigerian pots, but to the non-ceramic materials they used. The seeming haphazard nature with which the materials were juxtaposed was broad and diverse. Nigeria's influence is seen through Lowndes' own use of diverse materials. The speed in which they worked was influential as well. "African expediency and improvisation appealed to her…[as well as] the poetic content of the artefacts." Specifically, the Yoruba, who live in southwestern Nigeria near Ife University where Lowndes' husband worked during their time there, are known for their new styles and approaches to art. Yoruba artwork, which takes numerous forms, is deeply imbedded in a philosophical discourse pertaining to "deep talk". This conversation includes resemblance, balance, clarity, completeness, insight, aliveness, and durability. "Yoruba art might be defined summarily as 'evocative form' that is meant to be generative and transformative…at the core of Yoruba aesthetics is the saying 'character (or essence) is beauty'. This refers to the essential nature of a thing or person. When art captures the essential nature of something, the work will be deemed 'beautiful'."

Upon her return from Africa, Lowndes' "impatience with clay" and the so-called "craftsmanly side of her art" is apparent through her combination of "mainstream" sculpture materials "…that put the concept before the material." As a result of Lowndes' open approach to working, leaving room for reworking and rediscovery, her work vacillates between and perhaps challenges the "undefined space between craft and fine art." Her materially based experimentation and intuitive approach to making with a material that is traditionally seen as a purveyor of craft defines Lowndes' work as art that "…occupies an undefined space between the craft and fine art worlds.”

== Additional information ==
Her work is represented in many collections in Britain and she has had major shows at the Crafts Council (1987) and Contemporary Applied Arts (1994) and major exhibitions such as The Raw and the Cooked (1993–1994).

She lived for a time in Toppesfield, Essex, then following the death of her husband in 2000 she moved to Spitalfields in London.

== Death ==
Gillian Lowndes died on 2 October 2010, aged 74, from cancer.

== Sources ==
- S. Harley. "Ian Auld and Gillian Lowndes", Ceramic Review No. 44 (March/April 1977), pp. 4–5
- Elisabeth Cameron. "Gillian Lowndes", Ceramic Review No. 83, September/October 1983), p. 11
- Angus Suttie. "The Dangerous Edge of Things", Crafts No. 75 (1985), pp. 49–50
- Gillian Lowndes. Ceramics Monthlyvol 36, part 4 (April 1988), pp. 28–29
- Victor Margrit. "Gillian Lowndes", Studio Pottery # 9 (June/July 1994), pp. 34–38
- Palmer, D. "Tradition and Originality: Bernard Leach and the New Ceramics", Ceramics (Sydney, Australia) #60 (2005), pp. 101–103
