= William Tyndale =

English biblical scholar, translator, and reformer (1494–1536)

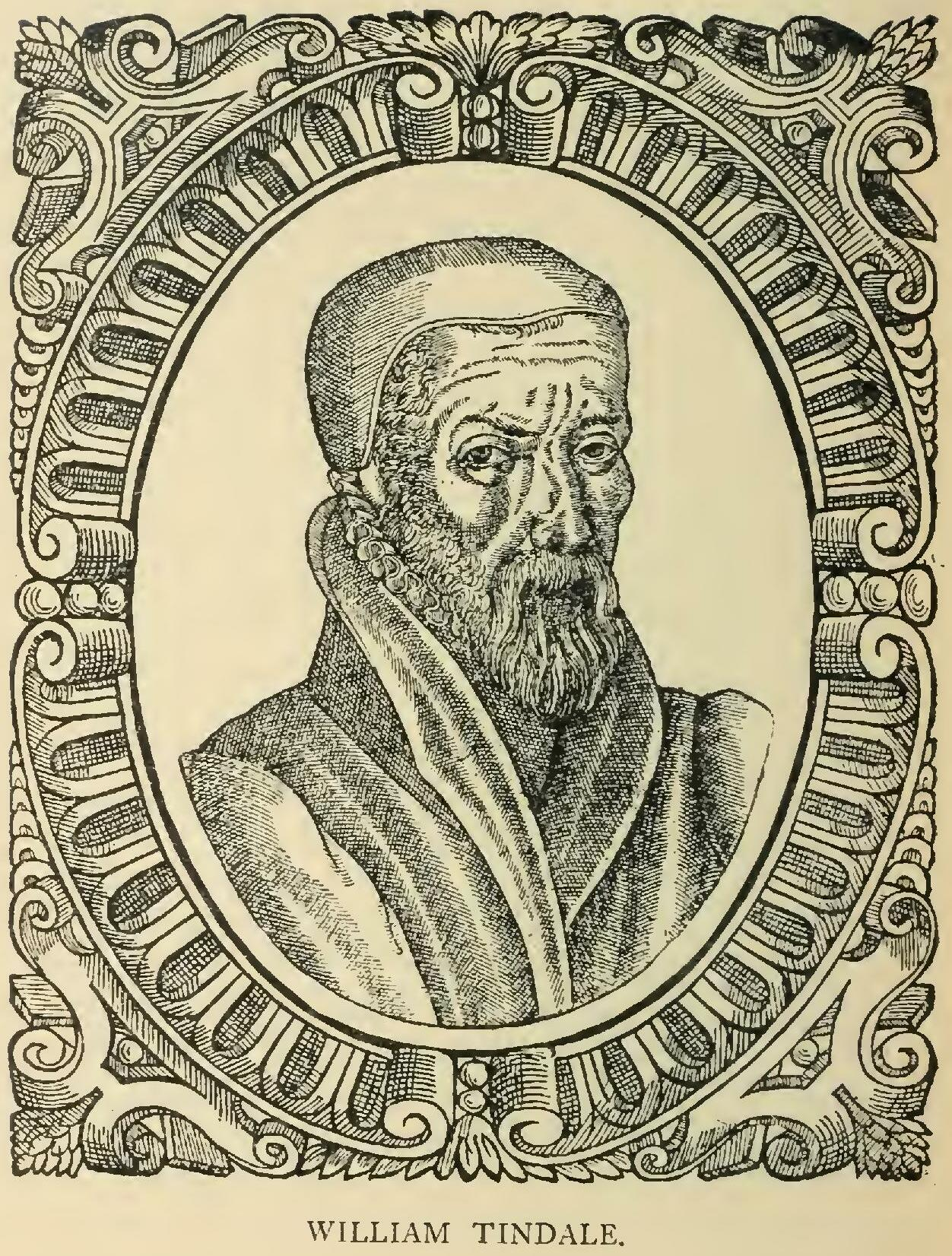
- 16th-century engraving of Tyndale
- Born: c. 1494; Gloucestershire, England
- Died: October 1536 (aged 42) near Vilvoorde, Duchy of Brabant, Habsburg Netherlands
- Cause of death: Execution by strangulation then burning
- Education: Katharine Lady Berkeley's School, Wotton-under-Edge; Magdalen Hall, Oxford, University of Cambridge
- Years active: 1521 to 1536
- Known for: Translation of the Pentateuch and New Testament into Early Modern English
- Notable work: Tyndale Bible

William Tyndale (/ˈtɪndəl/; sometimes spelled Tynsdale, Tindall, Tindill, Tyndall; c. 1494 – October 1536) was an English Biblical scholar and linguist who became a leading figure in the Protestant Reformation in the years leading up to his execution. He translated much of the Bible into English and was influenced by the works of prominent Protestant Reformers such as Martin Luther.

Tyndale's translations were the first English scriptures to draw directly from Hebrew and Greek texts, the first English translation to take advantage of the printing press, the first of the new English Bibles of the Reformation, and the first English translation to use Jehovah ("Iehouah") as God's name. (Note: In the seventh paragraph of Introduction to the Old Testament of the New English Bible, Sir Godfry Driver wrote, "The early translators generally substituted 'Lord' for [YHWH]. [...] The Reformers preferred Jehovah, which first appeared as Iehouah in 1530 A.D., in Tyndale's translation of the Pentateuch (Exodus 6.3), from which it passed into other Protestant Bibles.") It was taken to be a direct challenge to the authority of the Catholic Church and of those laws of England maintaining the church's position. The work of Tyndale continued to play a key role in spreading Reformation ideas across the English-speaking world.

In The Obedience of a Christian Man (1528), Tyndale argued for Caesaropapism, the idea that the monarch rather than the Pope should control a country's church. This was the first instance of advocating the divine right of kings in England (sometimes mistakenly attributed to the Catholic Church). The book came into the hands of King Henry VIII, providing a rationale for separating the church in England from the Catholic Church in 1534. In 1530, Tyndale wrote The Practice of Prelates, opposing Henry's plan to seek the annulment of his marriage on the grounds that it contravened Scripture. This work made him enemy of both the state and the church, therefore he fled England and sought refuge in the Flemish territory of the Catholic Charles V, Holy Roman Emperor. In 1535 Tyndale was arrested and jailed in the castle of Vilvoorde (Filford) outside Brussels. The following year he was convicted of heresy and executed by strangulation, after which his body was burnt at the stake.

Tyndale's translation choices of biblical phrases were substantially also adopted by subsequent English editions.

== Background ==
Tyndale lived and worked during the era of Renaissance humanism and the revival of Biblical scholarship, which were both aided by both the Gutenberg Revolution and the ensuing democratisation of knowledge; for example, the publication of Johann Reuchlin's Hebrew grammar in 1506. Notably, Erasmus compiled, edited, and published the Koine Greek scriptures of the New Testament in 1516. Luther's translation of the Christian Bible into German appeared between 1522 and 1534.

Partial Old English translations had been made from the 7th century onwards, and by the 14th century contemporary vernacular translations were available in most other major European languages. However the religious foment and violent rebellion of the Lollards resulted in heresy being treated as sedition under English law, which bore the death penalty. Lollardy was associated by authorities with the possession and public readings of Wycliffite Bibles in the newly emerged Middle English; manuscripts with Wycliffite material were destroyed; the possession of Wycliffite material could be used as information in investigations and inquisitions though not used as a proof of heresy.

By the early 16th century, the Wycliffite translations were becoming less and less comprehensible as the English language changed from Middle English to Early Modern English. Classical and Koine Greek texts became widely available to the European scholarly community for the first time in centuries, as it welcomed Greek-speaking scholars, philosophers, intellectuals, and the manuscripts they carried to Catholic Europe as refugees following the fall of Constantinople in 1453.

== Life ==
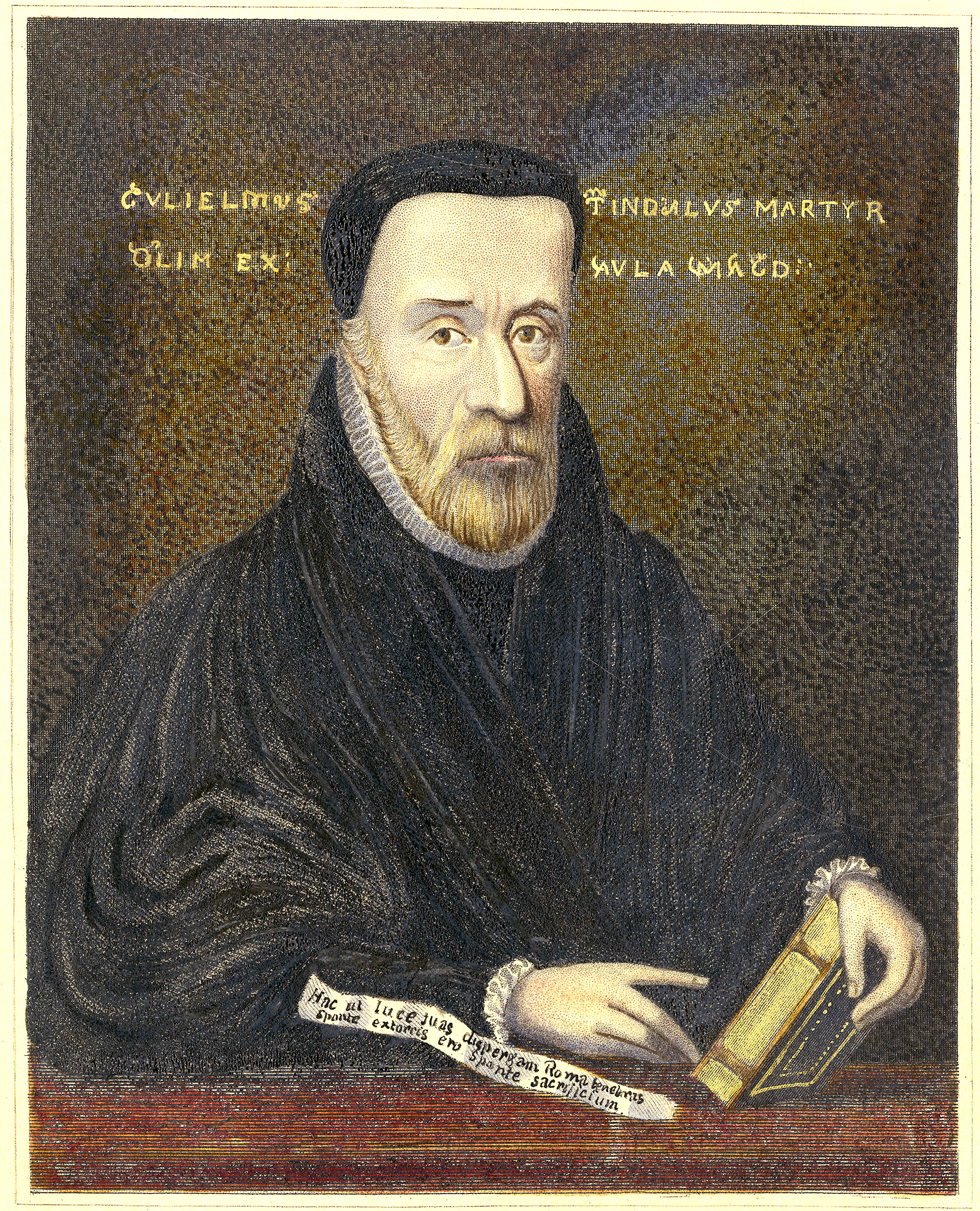
Portrait of William Tyndale (1836)

The Tyndale family also went by the name Hychyns (Hitchins), and it was as William Hychyns that Tyndale was enrolled at Magdalen Hall, Oxford. Tyndale's brother Edward was receiver to the lands of Lord Berkeley, as attested to in a letter by Bishop Stokesley of London. William Tyndale's niece Margaret Tyndale was married to Protestant martyr Rowland Taylor, burnt during the Marian Persecutions.

=== Theories about his origins ===
Tyndale may have been born around 1494 (Note: Tyndale's birth was about 1494 according to History of the Revised Version in 1881.) in Melksham Court, Stinchcombe, a village near Dursley, Gloucestershire. A conjecture is that Tyndale's family had moved to Gloucestershire at some point in the 15th century, probably as a result of the Wars of the Roses. The family may have originated from Northumberland via East Anglia. Tyndale is recorded in two Victorian genealogies which claim he was the brother of Sir William Tyndale of Deane, Northumberland, and Hockwold, Norfolk, who was knighted at the marriage of Arthur, Prince of Wales to Catherine of Aragon. If this is true then Tyndale's family was thus descended from Baron Adam de Tyndale, a tenant-in-chief of Henry I.

=== At Oxford and Cambridge ===
After schooling at Katharine Lady Berkeley's School, Wotton-under-Edge in Gloucestershire Tyndale began studies at Magdalen Hall (later Hertford College) of Oxford University in 1506 and was awarded a Bachelor of Arts degree in 1512, the same year being ordained a subdeacon. He was made Master of Arts in July 1515 and was held to be a man leading an unblemished life. The Master of Arts degree qualified him to begin preparation for the advanced degree of Doctor of Divinity, involving a systematic course of theological studies though not systematic biblical studies in a modern sense. Tyndale later lampooned this curriculum in scathing terms:

They have ordained that no man shall look on the Scripture until he is modeled in heathen learning eight or nine years and armed with false principles, with which he is clean shut out of the understanding of the Scripture.

He was a gifted linguist and became fluent over the years not only in Latin and Greek but also in Hebrew, as well as in French, German, Italian and Spanish. Between 1517 and 1521, he studied at the University of Cambridge. While Erasmus had been the leading teacher of Greek at Cambridge from August 1511 to January 1512, this did not coincide with Tyndale's residence there.

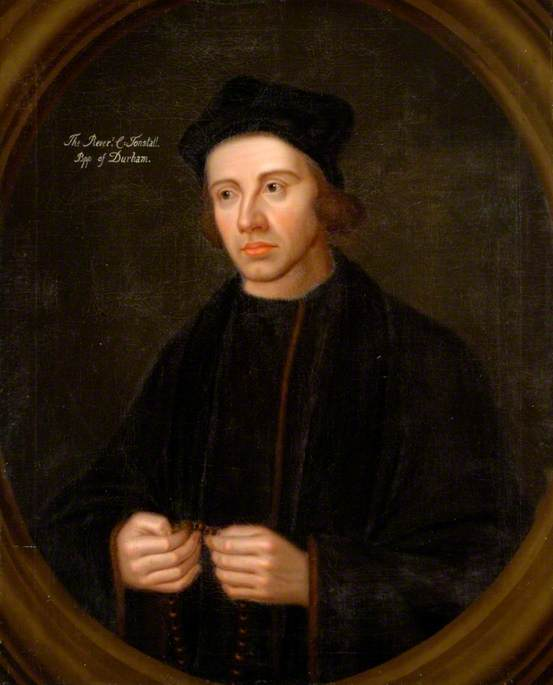
Cuthbert Tunstall (1474–1559), Bishop of Durham

Tyndale became chaplain at the home of Sir John Walsh at Little Sodbury in Gloucestershire and tutor to his children around 1521. His opinions proved controversial to fellow clergymen, and the next year he was summoned before John Bell, the Chancellor of the Diocese of Worcester, although no formal charges were laid at the time. After the meeting with Bell and other church leaders, Tyndale, according to John Foxe, had an argument with a "learned but blasphemous clergyman", who allegedly asserted: "We had better be without God's laws than the Pope's", to which Tyndale allegedly responded: "I defy the Pope and all his laws; and if God spares my life, ere many years, I will cause the boy that driveth the plow to know more of the Scriptures than thou dost!"

Tyndale left for London in 1523 to seek sponsorship and permission to translate the Bible into English. He applied to join the household of the Bishop of London, Cuthbert Tunstall, a well-known humanist who had worked with Erasmus, his friend of his, on the second edition of his Latin/Greek New Testament. The bishop, however, declined to fund Tyndale, on the grounds that his household was already full with scholars. Tyndale preached and studied "at his book" in London for some time, relying on the help of cloth merchant Humphrey Monmouth. During this time, he lectured widely, including at St Dunstan-in-the-West at Fleet Street in London.

=== In Europe ===
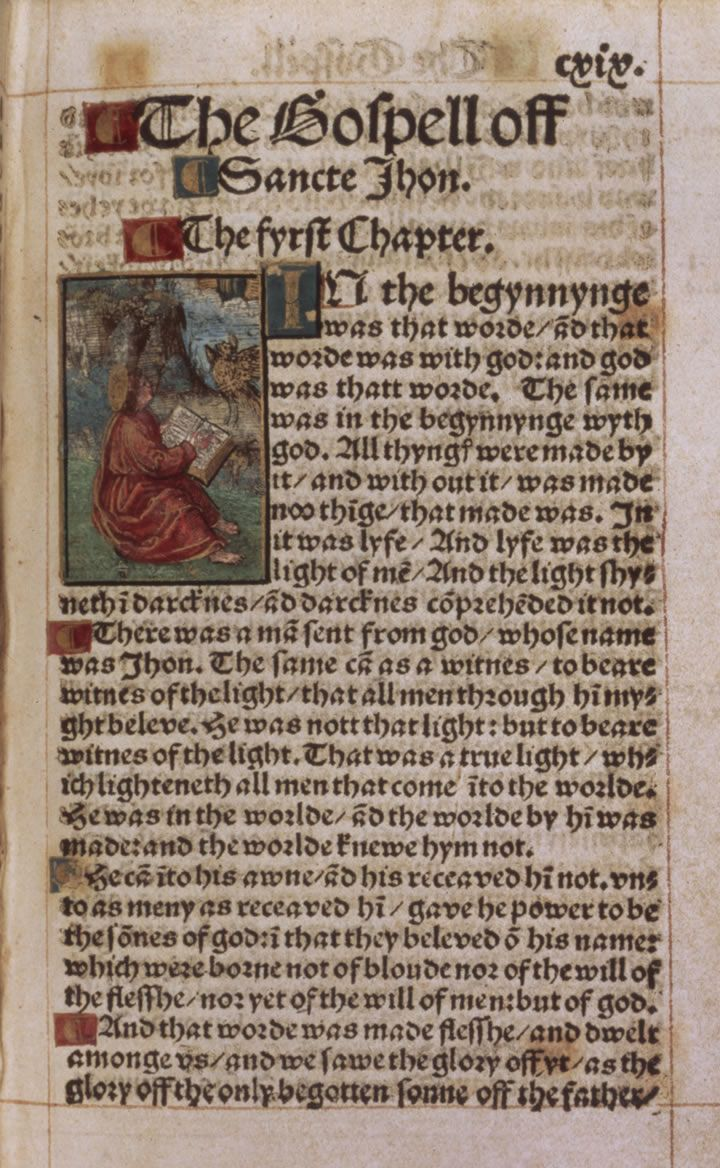
The beginning of the Gospel of John, from Tyndale's 1525 translation of the New Testament.

In the spring of 1524 Tyndale left England for continental Europe, perhaps staying first in Hamburg, before possibly traveling on to Wittenberg. There is an entry in the matriculation registers of the University of Wittenberg mentioning the name "Guillelmus Daltici ex Anglia", and this has been taken to be a Latinisation of "William Tyndale from England". Tyndale began translating the New Testament at this time, possibly in Wittenberg, completing it in 1525 with assistance from Observant Friar William Roy.

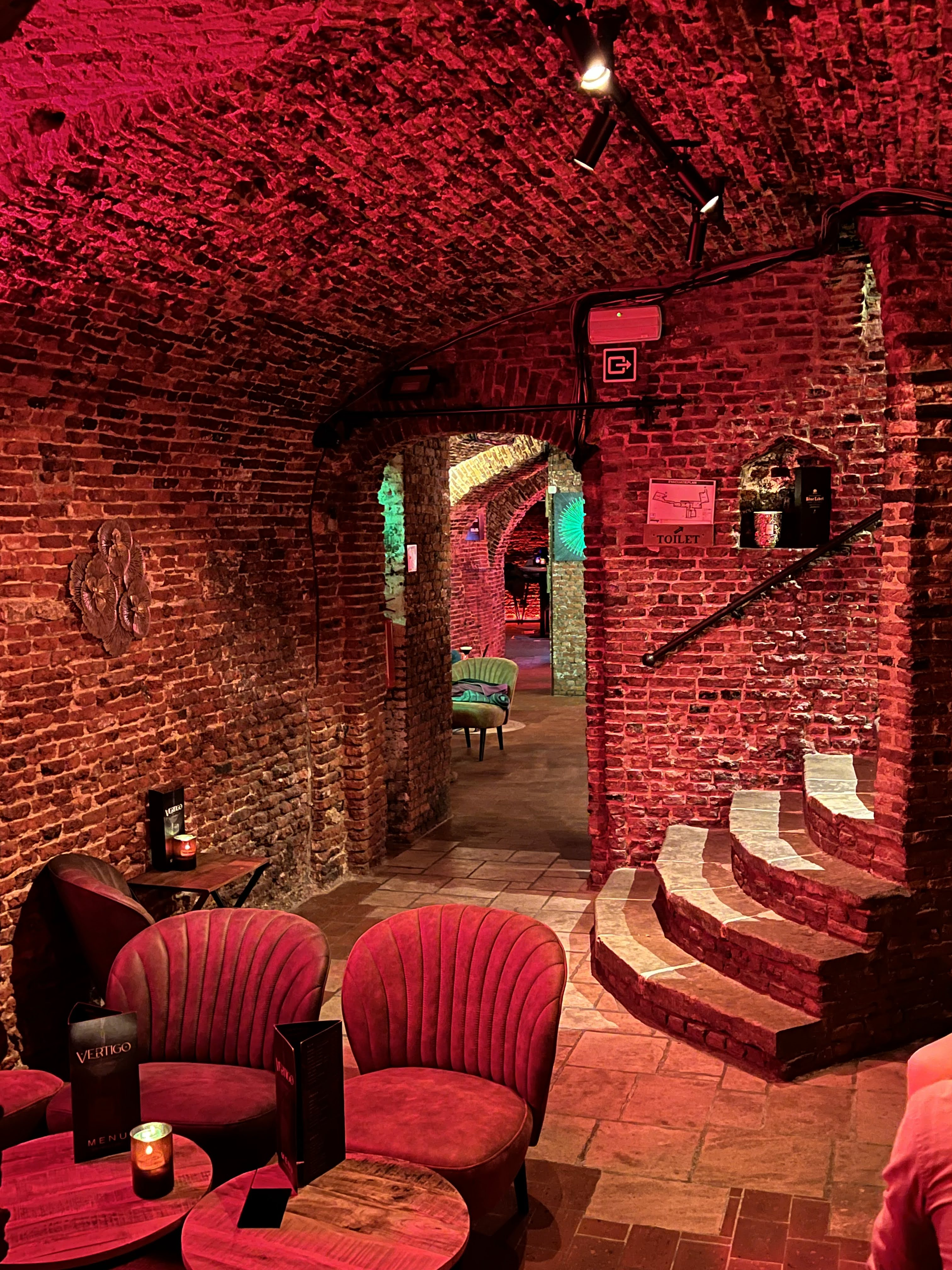
A former underground smuggler's cellar in Antwerp

In 1525 the publication of the work by Peter Quentell in Cologne was interrupted by the impact of anti-Lutheranism. A full edition of the New Testament was produced in 1526 by printer Peter Schöffer the Younger in Worms, a free imperial city then in the process of adopting Lutheranism. More copies were soon printed in Antwerp. The work was smuggled from continental Europe into England and Scotland by putting pages in between other legal books. The translation was condemned in October 1526 by Bishop Tunstall, who issued warnings to booksellers, bought up all the available copies, and had them burned in public. Marius notes that the "spectacle of the scriptures being put to the torch... provoked controversy even amongst the faithful." Cardinal Wolsey condemned Tyndale as a heretic, first stated in open court in January 1529.

From an entry in George Spalatin's diary for 11 August 1526, it would appear that Tyndale remained at Worms for about a year. It is not clear exactly when he moved to Antwerp, where he stayed at the house of Thomas Poyntz. The colophon to Tyndale's translation of Genesis and the title pages of several pamphlets from this time purported to have been printed by Hans Lufft at Marburg, but this is patently false, since Lufft, the printer of Luther's books, never operated a printing press at Marburg.

Henry VIII asked Emperor Charles V to have the writer apprehended and returned to England under the terms of the Treaty of Cambrai; however, the emperor responded that formal evidence was required before extradition. (Note: "Henry claimed that Tyndale was spreading sedition, but the Emperor expressed his doubts and argued that he must examine the case and discover proof of the English King's assertion before delivering the wanted man.") In 1531 he asked Stephen Vaughan to persuade Tyndale to retract his heretical opinions and return to England. Vaughan tried to persuade Tyndale, and forwarded copies of his books, but this did not satisfy the king.

Tyndale developed his case in An Answer unto Sir Thomas More's Dialogue.

==== Opposition to Henry VIII's annulment ====
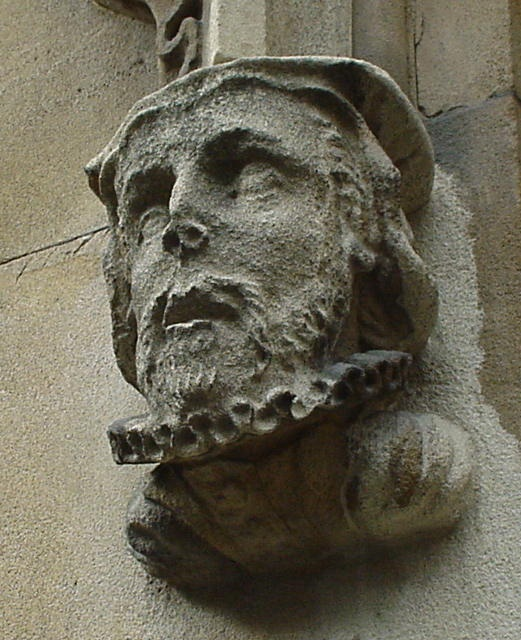
Sculpted Head of William Tyndale from St Dunstan-in-the-West Church, London

In 1530, from exile, he wrote The Practice of Prelates, opposing Henry VIII's desire to secure the annulment of his marriage to Catherine of Aragon in favour of Anne Boleyn, on the grounds that it was unscriptural and that it was a plot by Cardinal Wolsey to get Henry entangled in the papal courts of Pope Clement VII. (Note: "...English kings on one side and the wicked popes and English bishops on the other. Cardinal Wolsey embodies the culmination of centuries of conspiracy, and Tyndale's hatred of Wolsey is so nearly boundless that it seems pathological.")

Historian Bruce Boehrer writes that for Tyndale the issue related to the perspicuity of literal scripture: "I suspect he (Tyndale) undercut the arguments of both Church and King because he found both to be based upon an objectionable premise: that the word of God should be subject to the final arbitrament of a single man."

==== Betrayal and death ====
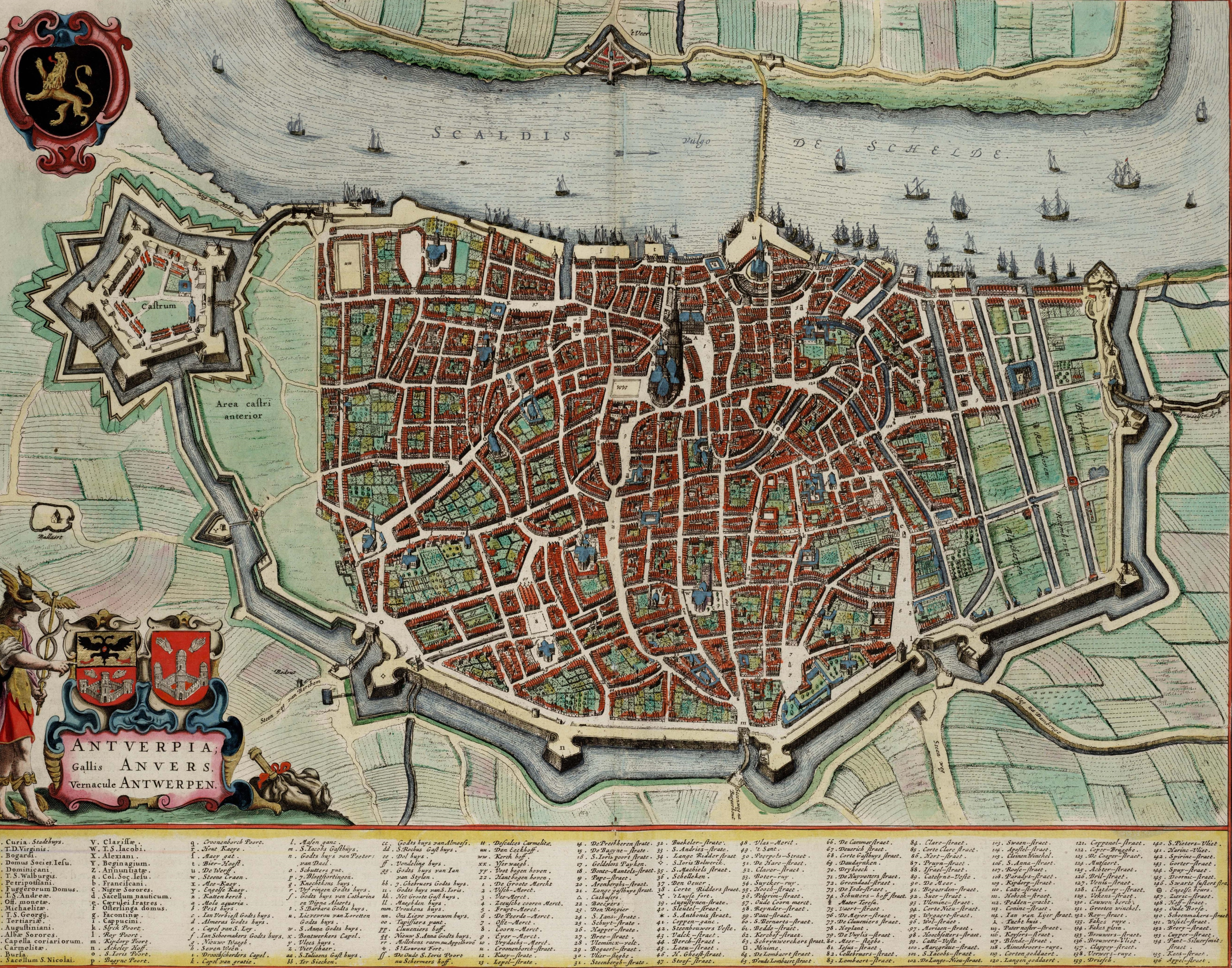
Location of English House on Housing Block between Numbers 147 & 148 of this HR Vintage Map of the City of Antwerp

Eventually, Tyndale was betrayed by Henry Phillips to ducal authorities representing the Holy Roman Empire. He was seized at the English House in Antwerp in 1535, situated in the same block of houses as the world's first stock exchange and held in the castle of Vilvoorde (Filford) near Brussels.

Tyndale writes from his cell in 1535; in the original Latin with English subtitles

Following the insurrections of the Albigensians, the Lollards, the Hussites, the German Peasants' War, the Münster Anabaptist rebellion, etc., heresy was connected by states with sedition and possible regicide; it carried, at worst, the death penalty of burning at the stake. The Church could usually protect someone accused of heresy from being charged by the state, if that person satisfied the appointed theologian inquisitor, in a formal process, that he or she did not (now) hold heretical views.

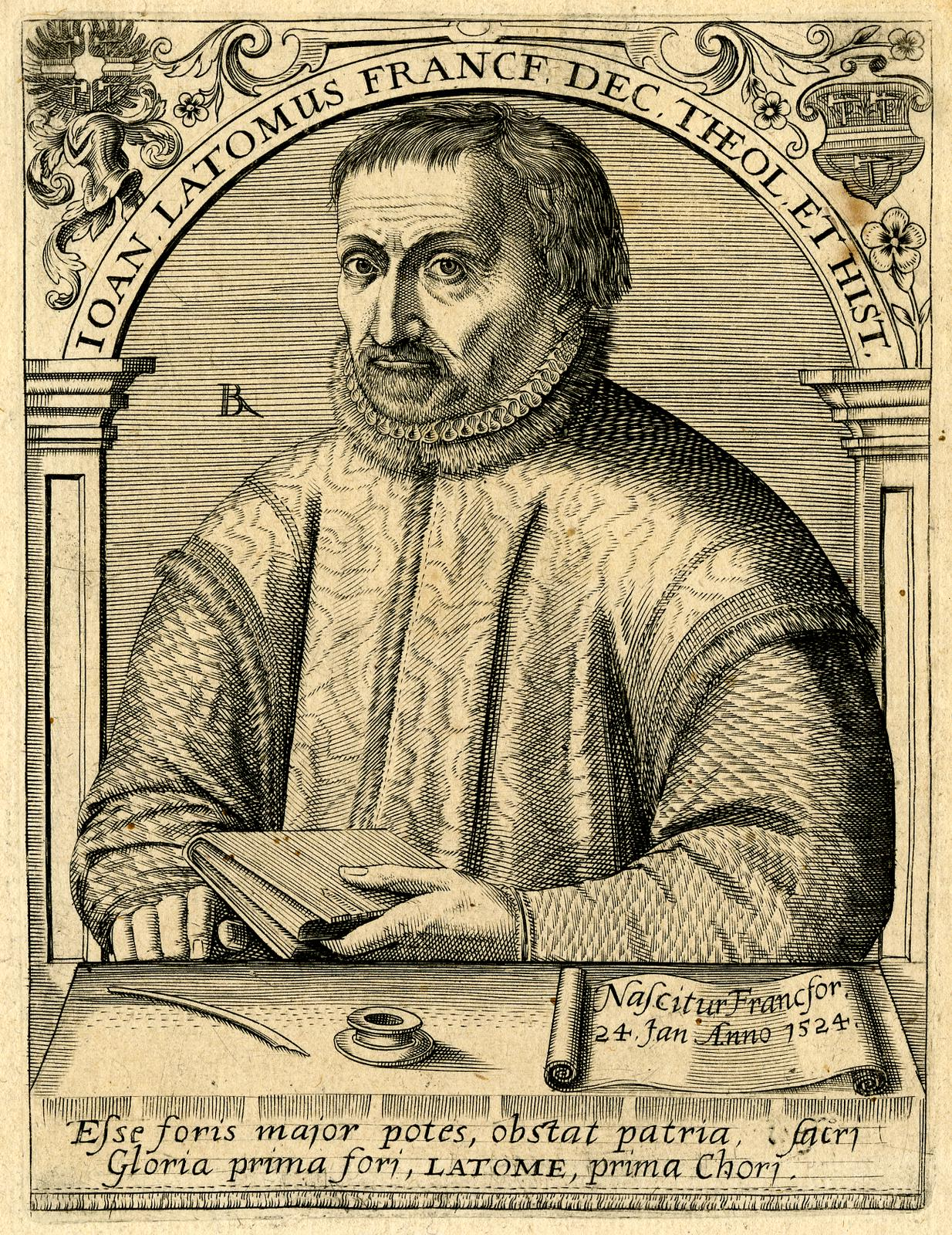
Latomus

In Tyndale's case, he was held in prison for a year and a half: his Roman Catholic inquisitor, Jacobus Latomus, gave him the opportunity to write a book stating his views; Latomus wrote a book in response to convince him of his errors; Tyndale wrote two in reply; Latomus wrote two further books in response to Tyndale. Latomus' three books were subsequently published as one volume: in these it can be seen that the discussion on heresy revolves around the contents of three other books Tyndale had written on topics like justification by faith, free will, the denial of the soul, and so on. (See Latomus' report of Tyndale's beliefs below.) Latomus makes no mention of unauthorized Bible translation; indeed, it seems that in prison, Tyndale was allowed to continue making translations from the Hebrew. Thomas Cromwell was involved in some intercession or plans such as extradition.

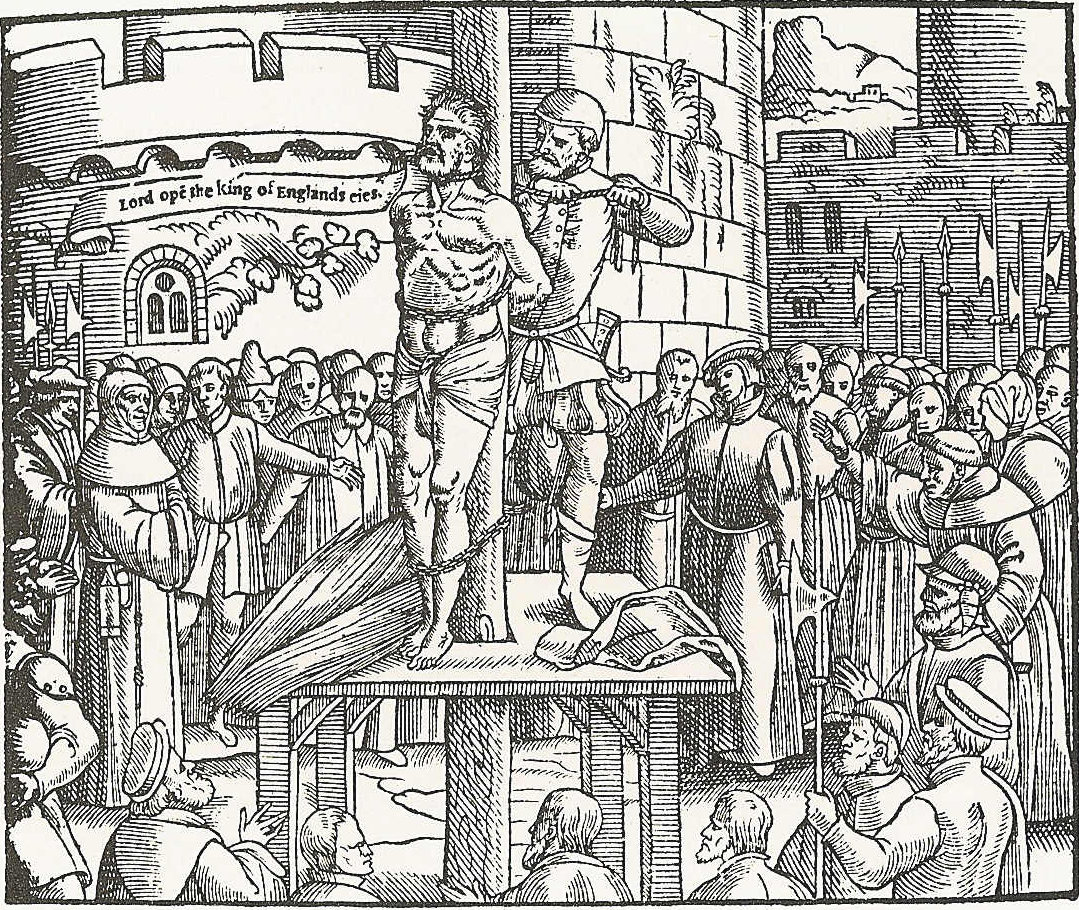
Tyndale, before being strangled and burned at the stake in Vilvoorde, cries out, "Lord, open the King of England's eyes". Woodcut from Foxe's Book of Martyrs (1563) which is the earliest source of the quote.

When Tyndale could not be convinced to abjure, he was handed over to the Brabantine secular arm and tried on charges of Lutheran heresy in 1536. The charges did not mention Bible translation, which was not illegal in the Netherlands.

He was found guilty by his own admission and condemned to be executed. Tyndale "was strangled to death (Note: This was the custom in Flanders, a mercy. Schofield, John (2011). The Rise and Fall of Thomas Cromwell: Henry VIII's Most Faithful Servant. The History Press. ISBN 978-0-7524-7292-8.) while tied at the stake, and then his dead body was burned". His final words, spoken "at the stake with a fervent zeal, and a loud voice", were reported later as "Lord! Open the King of England's eyes." The traditional date of commemoration is 6 October, but records of Tyndale's imprisonment suggest that the actual date of his execution was some weeks earlier. Foxe gives 6 October as the date of commemoration (left-hand date column), but gives no date of death (right-hand date column). Biographer David Daniell states his date of death only as "one of the first days of October 1536".

==== Sequelae ====
Within four years of Tyndale's death, a sequence of four English translations of the Bible were published in England at the king's behest, revising Tyndale's versions of the New Testament and Pentateuch with various objectionable features removed: Miles Coverdale's, Thomas Matthew's, Richard Taverner's, and the Great Bible.

== Theological views ==
Tyndale was conjectured by Donald Smeeton to have come out of the Lollard tradition, which Smeeton argued was strong in Gloucestershire, but later scholars have cast doubt on these claims. Tyndale denounced the practice of prayer to saints. He also rejected the view that the scriptures could be interpreted only by approved clergy. While his views were influenced by Luther, Tyndale also deliberately distanced himself from the German reformer on several key theological points, adopting a more symbolical interpretation of the Lord's Supper in opposition to Luther's doctrine of the real presence of Christ in the Eucharist.

Tyndale was very much interested in what has become known as covenant theology ("Seek therefore in the scripture, as thou readest it, chiefly and above all, the covenants made between God and us"), and took what has come to be thought of as a Calvinist stance on many issues, including the atonement ("Christ's blood only putteth away all the sin that ever was, is, or shall be, from them that are elect"). His Reformation sacramentology may surprise some modern evangelicals: "the sacraments which Christ ordained preach God's word unto us, and therefore justify, and minister the Spirit to them that believe".

— Dr Lee Gatiss

=== Latomus' report of Tyndale's beliefs ===
The following section is mainly based on the English version of Jacob Latomus His Three Books of Confutations Against William Tyndale. The books of Tyndale's replies were never published and have not survived, but the particular views that lead to his conviction as a heretic may be gleaned from Latomus' summary and responses.

Jacobus Latomus began his initial book, attempting to get Tyndale to abjure his Lutheranism, by stating six broad beliefs which he believed both Tyndale and Catholics held:

- "that all Holy Writ is divinely inspired, and that every part thereof is true, as being divinely revealed
- that predestination, election, vocation, and justification,... occur freely and are not subject to human deserving
- that the grace which is given to those who worthily (i.e. sincerely) receive the sacraments of baptism or penance is not subject to human merit, but is simply given freely by God through Christ from the merit of his Passion
- (adults) that faith does not justify them unless they acknowledge their sin:... unless condemning themselves and their sins they flee to the refuge of Christ's blood
- (that is it false that) an evil life can consist with the best faith
- that justifying faith is not simply any faith, but that faith which works through love...a solitary faith, without the accompaniment of other virtues, does not justify.
- that the Apostle in saying that man is justified by faith without the works of the Law ... does not mean this only of the written law proper to the people of the Jews, i.e. ceremonial and judicial laws, but of moral laws... such knowledge did not suffice to fulfil the Law without the grace and spirit of Christ, and that this grace and spirit are given by Christ to whomsoever they are given."

The first book of Latomus then gives numerous descriptions of where Tyndale's opinion, as he understood it, differed from Catholic dogma or doctrine.

In Latomus' second book he quotes Tyndale that "God the Father so grants all things freely through Christ that he gives nothing in respect of any work or because of any work inward or outward" and comments that, while it is so for predestination, election, and adoption, Catholic doctrine is that human merit has a place in beatification, crowning, and rewarding.

Latomus' third book is divided into topics whose headings can be taken as his summary of Tyndale's divergence from pre-Tridentine Catholic dogma or doctrine, ending his lengthy inquiry. Due to these, in combination, Latomus was unable to pronounce Tyndale an orthodox Catholic, or to convince him to abjure, and so could not prevent Tyndale from being executed by the state as a recruiting Lutheran threat.

- On faith
- On charity
- On the keys
- On bishops, priests and deacons
- On obedience even to a bad prelate
- On vows
- On oaths
- On fasting
- On the saints reigning with Christ
- On the relics of saints
- On images of Christ and the saints
- On purgatory
- On the justification of the impious
- On sacraments
- He who worthily receives sacraments receives grace
- The authority of the pope over the church and any member of it

== Printed works ==
Although best known for his translation of the Bible, Tyndale was also an active writer and translator. As well as his focus on how religion should be lived, he had a focus on political issues.

Year Printed	Name of Work	Place of Publication	Publisher
1525	The New Testament translation (incomplete)	Cologne	
1526*	The New Testament translation (first full printed edition in English)	Worms	Peter Schöffer the Younger
1526	A compendious introduction, prologue, or preface into the epistle of Paul to the Romans		
1527	The parable of the wicked mammon	Antwerp	Benjamin Mathew
1528	The Obedience of a Christen Man (and how Christen rulers ought to govern...)	Antwerp	Merten de Keyser
1530*	The five books of Moses [the Pentateuch] translation (each book with individual title page)	Antwerp	Merten de Keyser
1530	The practice of prelates	Antwerp	Merten de Keyser
1531	The exposition of the first epistle of Saint John with a prologue before it	Antwerp	Merten de Keyser
1531?	The prophet Jonah translation	Antwerp	Merten de Keyser
1531	An answer to Sir Thomas More's dialogue		
1533?	An exposition upon the. v. vi. vii. chapters of Mathew		
1533	Erasmus: Enchiridion militis Christiani translation		
1533	The Souper of the Lorde	Nornburg	Niclas Twonson
1534	The New Testament translation (thoroughly revised, with a second foreword against George Joye's unauthorized changes in an edition of Tyndale's New Testament published earlier in the same year)	Antwerp	Merten de Keyser
1535	The testament of master Wylliam Tracie esquire, expounded both by W. Tindall and J. Frith		
1536?	A pathway into the holy scripture		
1537	The Matthew Bible, which is a Holy Scripture translation (Tyndale, Rogers, and Coverdale)	Hamburg	Richard Grafton
1548?	A brief declaration of the sacraments		
1573	The whole works of W. Tyndall, John Frith, and Doct. Barnes, edited by John Foxe		
1848*	Doctrinal Treatises and Introductions to Different Portions of the Holy Scriptures, edited by Henry Walter.		Tindal, Frith, Barnes
1849*	Expositions and Notes on Sundry Portions of the Holy Scriptures Together with the Practice of Prelates, edited by Henry Walter.		
1850*	An Answer to Sir Thomas More's Dialogue, The Supper of the Lord after the True Meaning of John VI. and I Cor. XI., and William Tracy's Testament Expounded, edited by Henry Walter.		
1964*	The Work of William Tyndale		
1989**	Tyndale's New Testament		
1992**	Tyndale's Old Testament		
*These works were printed more than once, usually signifying a revision or reprint. However, the 1525 edition was printed as an incomplete quarto and was then reprinted in 1526 as a complete octavo. **These works were reprints of Tyndale's earlier translations revised for modern spelling.

== Legacy ==
=== Impact on English Bibles ===
Tyndale's translations of biblical books were re-used by subsequent English editions (often without his sectarian prefaces or annotations) including the Great Bible and the Bishops' Bible, authorized by the Church of England. In 1611, after seven years of work, the 47 scholars who produced the King James Version of the Bible drew extensively from Tyndale's original work and other translations that descended from his. Estimates have suggested that the New Testament in the King James Version is between 55% and 83% of the words in Tyndale's version, and the first half of the Old Testament 76%. In 2002, Tyndale was placed 26th in the BBC's poll of the 100 Greatest Britons.

The translators of the Revised Standard Version in the 1940s noted that Tyndale's translation, including the 1537 Matthew Bible, inspired the translations that followed: The Great Bible of 1539; the Geneva Bible of 1560; the Bishops' Bible of 1568; the Douay-Rheims Bible of 1582–1609; and the King James Version of 1611, of which the RSV translators noted: "It [the KJV] kept felicitous phrases and apt expressions, from whatever source, which had stood the test of public usage. It owed most, especially in the New Testament, to Tyndale".

George Steiner in his book on translation After Babel refers to "the influence of the genius of Tyndale, the greatest of English Bible translators."

=== Memorials ===
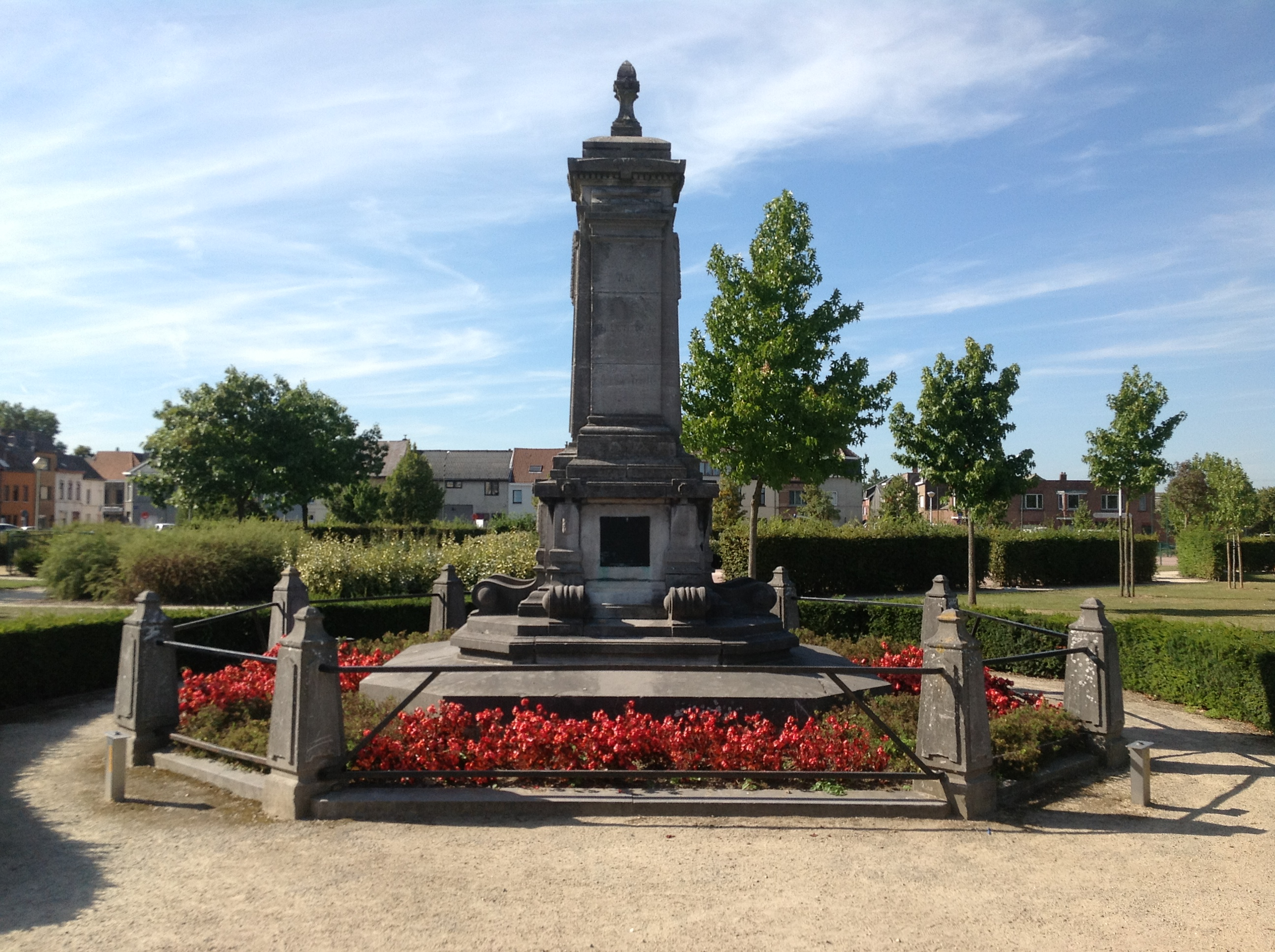
Memorial to William Tyndale in a public garden in Vilvoorde in Belgium, where he was executed

A memorial to Tyndale stands in Vilvoorde, Flanders, where he was executed. It was erected in 1913 by Friends of the Trinitarian Bible Society of London and the Belgian Bible Society. There is also a small William Tyndale Museum in the town, attached to the Protestant church. A bronze statue by Sir Joseph Boehm commemorating the life and work of Tyndale was erected in Victoria Embankment Gardens on the Thames Embankment, London, in 1884. It shows his right hand on an open Bible, which is itself resting on an early printing press. A life-sized bronze statue of a seated William Tyndale at work on his translation by Lawrence Holofcener (2000) was placed in the Millennium Square, Bristol, United Kingdom.

The Tyndale Monument was built in 1866 on a hill above his supposed birthplace, North Nibley, Gloucestershire. A stained-glass window commemorating Tyndale was made in 1911 for the British and Foreign Bible Society by James Powell and Sons. In 1994, after the Society had moved their offices from London to Swindon, the window was reinstalled in the chapel of Hertford College in Oxford. Tyndale was at Magdalen Hall, Oxford, which became Hertford College in 1874. The window depicts a full-length portrait of Tyndale, a cameo of a printing shop in action, some words of Tyndale, the opening words of Genesis in Hebrew, the opening words of St John's Gospel in Greek, and the names of other pioneering Bible translators. The portrait is based on the oil painting that hangs in the college's dining hall. A stained glass window by Arnold Robinson in Tyndale Baptist Church, Bristol, also commemorates the life of Tyndale.

Several colleges, schools and study centres have been named in his honour, including Tyndale House (Cambridge), Tyndale University (Toronto), the Tyndale-Carey Graduate School affiliated to the Bible College of New Zealand, William Tyndale College (Farmington Hills, Michigan), and Tyndale Theological Seminary (Shreveport, Louisiana, and Fort Worth, Texas), the independent Tyndale Theological Seminary in Badhoevedorp, the Netherlands, Tyndale Christian School in South Australia, Tyndale Park Christian School in New Zealand, and Tyndale Christian School in Arlington County, Virginia, in the United States. An American Christian publishing house, also called Tyndale House, was named after Tyndale.

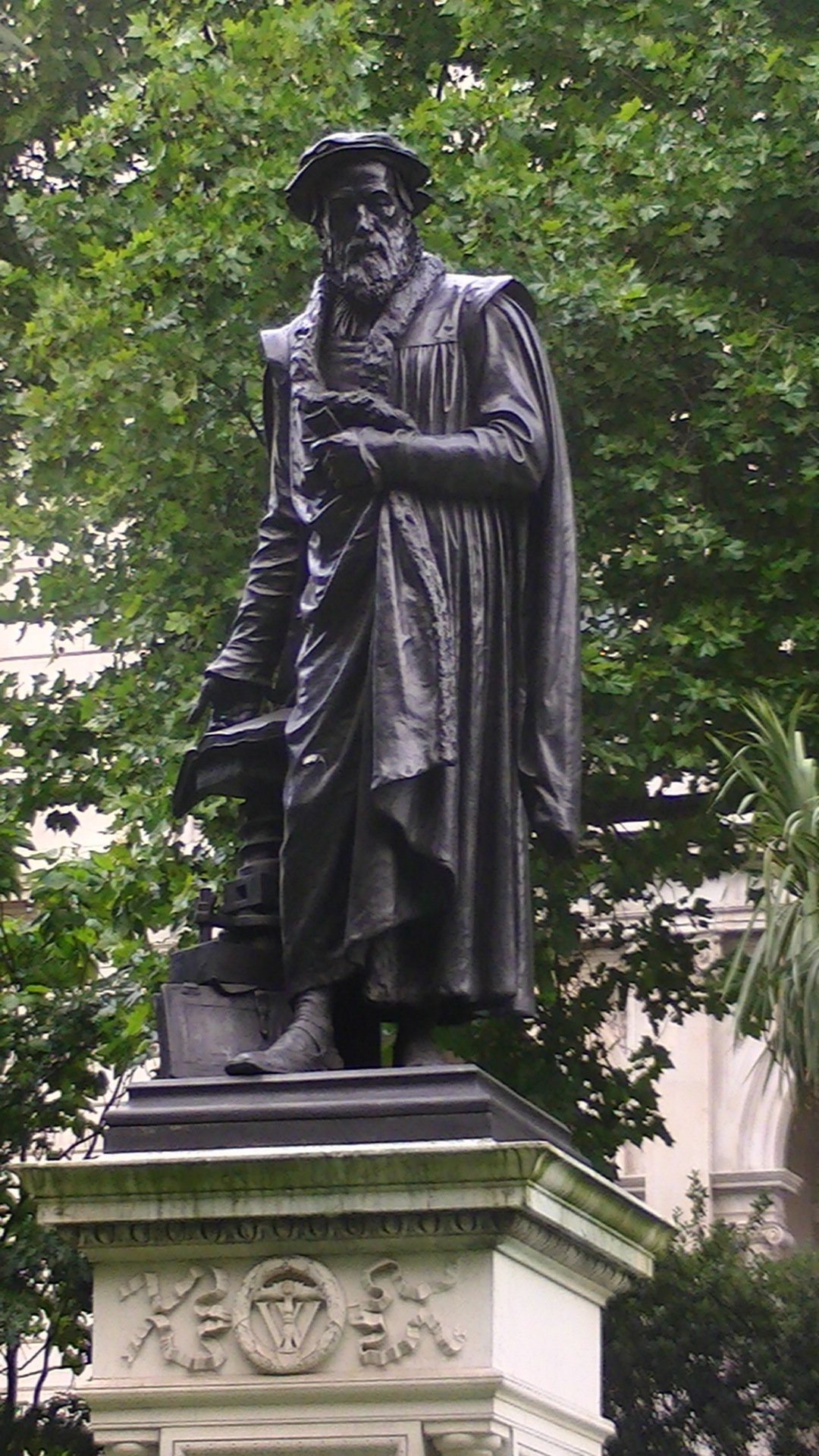
Statue of William Tyndale on the Victoria Embankment in London

There is an Anglican communion setting in memoriam William Tyndale, The Tyndale Service, by David Mitchell.

=== Liturgical commemoration ===
By tradition Tyndale's death is commemorated on 6 October. There are commemorations on this date in the church calendars of members of the Anglican Communion, initially as one of the "days of optional devotion" in the American Book of Common Prayer (1979), and a "black-letter day" in the Church of England's Alternative Service Book. The Common Worship that came into use in the Church of England in 2000 provides a collect proper to 6 October (Lesser Festival), beginning with the words:

Lord, give your people grace to hear and keep your word that, after the example of your servant William Tyndale, we may not only profess your gospel but also be ready to suffer and die for it, to the honor of your name;

Tyndale is honored in the Calendar of saints of the Evangelical Lutheran Church in America as a translator and martyr the same day.

== Personality and character ==
In his own words, Tyndale was "evil-favoured in this world, and without grace in the sight of men, speechless and rude, dull and slow-witted".

Tyndale wrote it had been his duty to translate the New Testament and reveals a confrontational style, saying, "In burning the New Testament they did none other thing than I looked for; no more shall they do, if they burn me also, if it be God's will it shall be so. Nevertheless, in translating the New Testament I did my duty..."

His contemporary theological opponent Thomas More, who never met Tyndale personally, charitably described Tyndale as "a man of sober and honest living who was well educated, well liked, and a good preacher."

Tyndale fought with another reformer George Joye who wrote in 1535: "Let every man be ware how he medle with Tin[dale]," finding him disdainful, conceited, hypocritical and unwilling to have his Bible translations corrected.

John Foxe, writing in around 1562, considered Tyndale "simple and inexpert" in "the wily subtleties of this world."

The view of Tyndale given by a recent biography has been summarized as a "difficult, aggressive, unworldly and monomaniacal man."

Another modern biographer alludes to Tyndale's reputation as a "trouble-maker". The famous ploughboy story attributed to him takes place as a heated argument at a dinner party.

== Works about Tyndale ==
The first biographical film about Tyndale, titled William Tindale, was released in 1937. Arnold Wathen Robinson depicted Tyndale's life in stained glass windows for the Tyndale Baptist Church ca. 1955. The 1975 novel The Hawk that Dare Not Hunt by Day by Scott O'Dell fictionalizes Tyndale and the smuggling of his Bible into England. The film God's Outlaw: The Story of William Tyndale, was released in 1986. The 1998 film Stephen's Test of Faith includes a long scene with Tyndale, how he translated the Bible, and how he was put to death.

A cartoon film about his life, titled Torchlighters: The William Tyndale Story, was released ca. 2005. The documentary film, William Tyndale: Man with a Mission, was released ca. 2005. The movie included an interview with David Daniell. In 2007, the 2-hour Channel 4 documentary, The Bible Revolution, presented by Rod Liddle, details the roles of historically significant English Reformers John Wycliffe, William Tyndale, and Thomas Cranmer. The "Battle for the Bible" (2007) episode of the PBS Secrets of the Dead series, narrated by Liev Schreiber, features Tyndale's story and legacy and includes historical context. This film is an abbreviated and revised version of the PBS/Channel 4 version.

He has also appeared as a character in two plays dealing with the King James Bible, Howard Brenton's Anne Boleyn (2010) and David Edgar's Written on the Heart (2011).

In 2011, BYUtv produced a documentary miniseries, Fires of Faith, on the creation of the King James Bible, which focused heavily on Tyndale's life. In 2013, BBC Two aired a 60-minute documentary The Most Dangerous Man in Tudor England, written and presented by Melvyn Bragg.

Another known documentary is the film William Tyndale: His Life, His Legacy.

Further short documentary is They Valued the Bible—Excerpt (William Tyndale)

== Tyndale's pronunciation ==
Tyndale was writing at the beginning of the Early Modern English period. His pronunciation must have differed in its phonology from that of Shakespeare at the end of the period. In 2013 linguist David Crystal made a transcription and a sound recording of Tyndale's translation of the whole of the Gospel of Matthew in what he believes to be the pronunciation of the day, using the term "original pronunciation". The recording has been published by The British Library on two compact discs with an introductory essay by Crystal.

== See also ==
- Luther Bible
- Textus Receptus
