= Humphrey Monmouth =

English merchant (died 1537)

- Died: 23 November 1537
- Occupation: merchant

Humphrey Monmouth (died 23 November 1537) was an English merchant in London who was an acquaintance of Bible translator William Tyndale. Monmouth was a wealthy member of the Drapers' Company and served as an alderman and sheriff of London from 1535 to 1536.

Monmouth had Lollard connections and was an early convert to Protestantism. He was a benefactor of William Tyndale as he was working on his English translation of the Bible. Tyndale lived in Monmouth's household for several months before he was exiled to Germany. In 1528, Monmouth was arrested and placed in the Tower of London, for his possession of certain heretical books and on account of his association with Tyndale.
