= John Frith (martyr) =

English Protestant priest, writer, and martyr

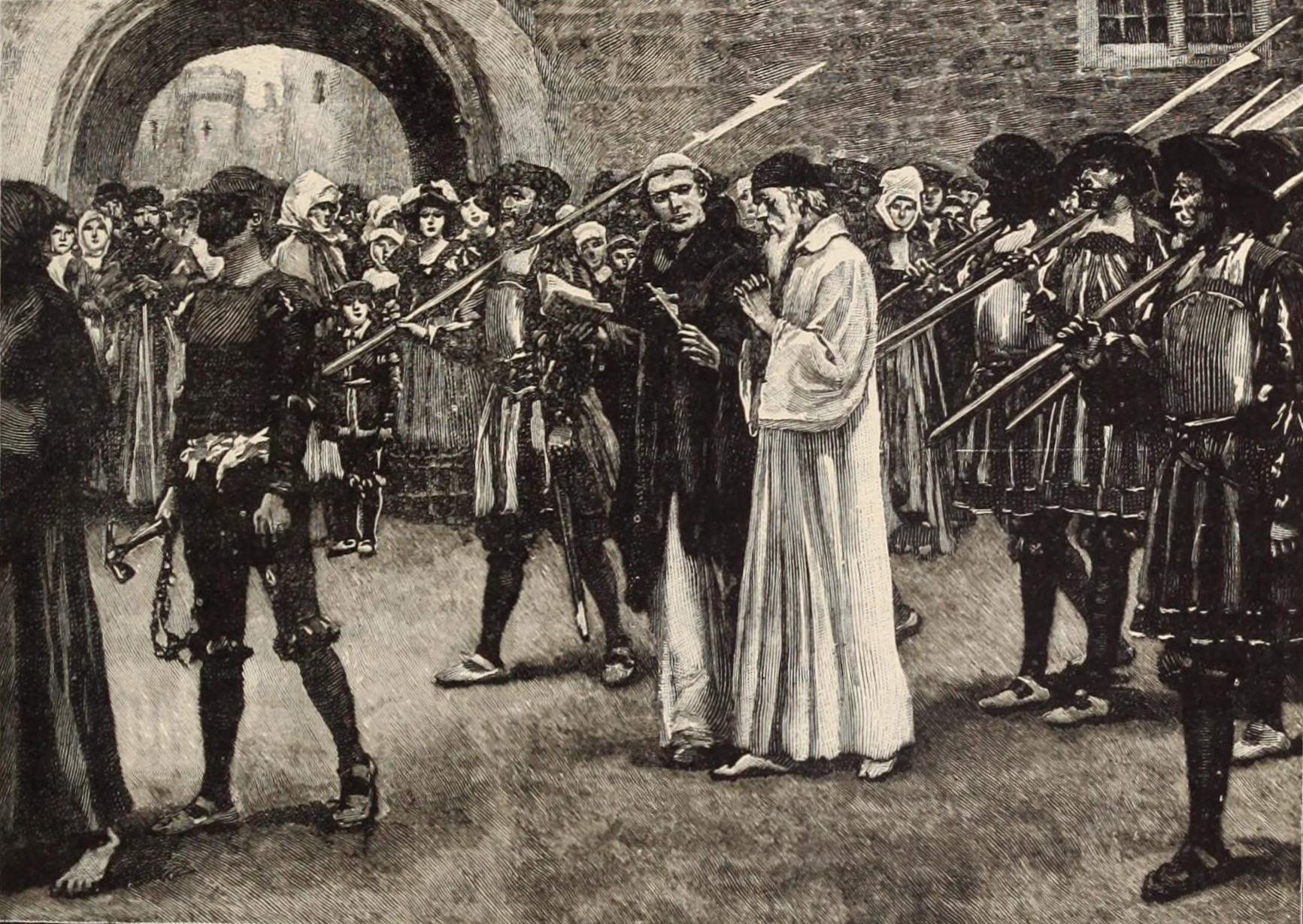
John Frith going to martyrdom (19th-century illustration)

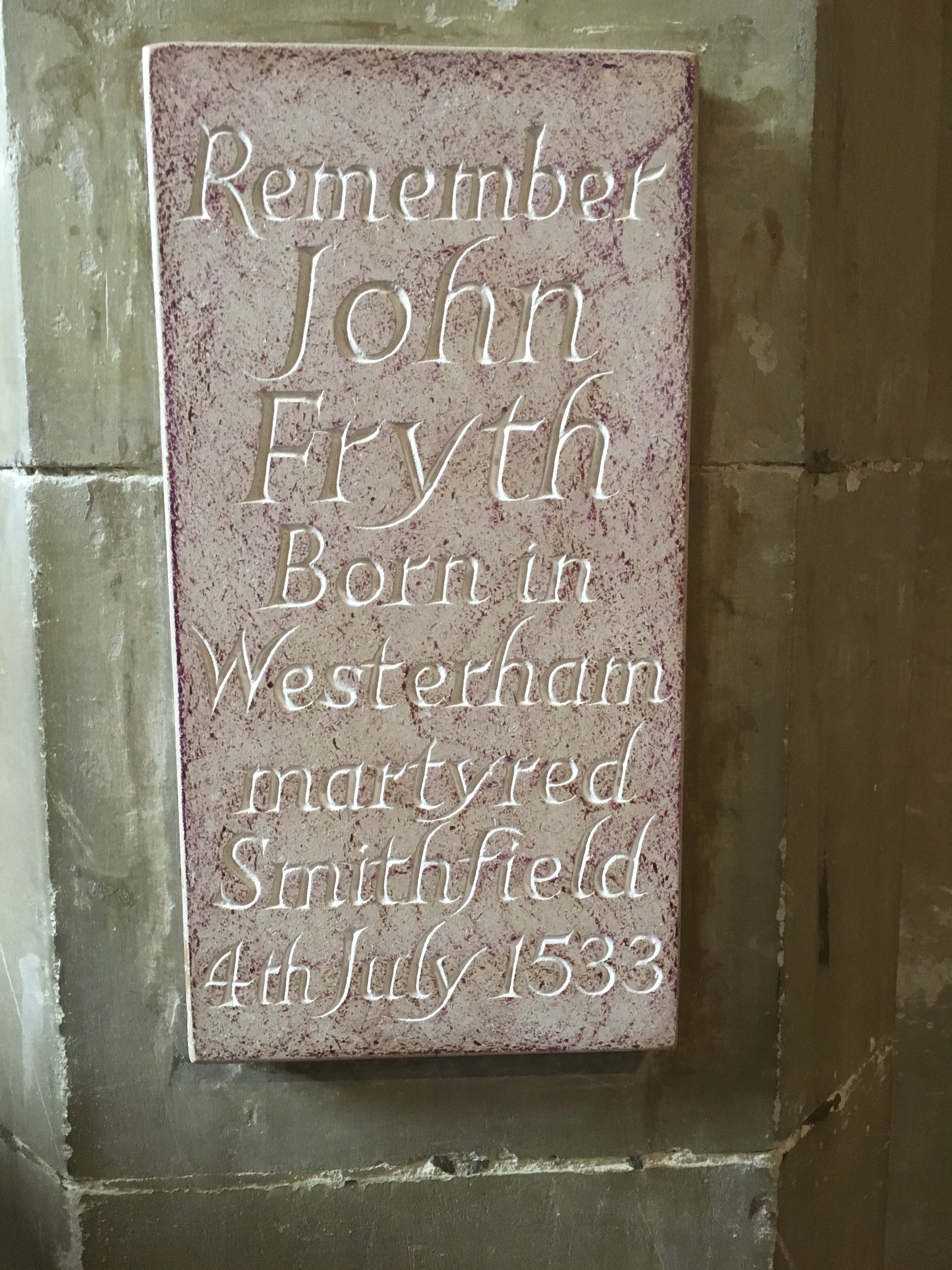

John Frith (1503 – 4 July 1533) was an English Protestant priest, writer, and martyr.

Frith was an important contributor to the Christian debate on persecution and toleration in favour of the principle of religious toleration. He was 'perhaps the first to echo in England' of that 'more liberal tradition' of Zwingli, Melanchthon and Bucer. As his ministry progressed, Frith took greater risks with his stance against the Catholic teachings of Purgatory and Transubstantiation. He was eventually brought before Thomas Cranmer and the Inquisition for his teachings and condemned to be burned at the stake for heresy.

In his revision of Foxe's Book of Martyrs, author Harold Chadwick writes the following about John Frith: "Master Frith was a young man noted for his godliness, intelligence, and knowledge. In the secular world, he could have risen to any height he wished, but he chose, instead, to serve the Church and work for the benefit of others and not himself." During his studies, he became acquainted with William Tyndale who deeply influenced Frith's beliefs. Like Tyndale and Luther, Frith played an influential role in the Protestant Reformation.

== Biography ==
=== Early life and education ===
John Frith (John Fryth) was born in 1503 in Westerham, Kent, England to Richard Frith the innkeeper of White Horse Inn (now known as Church Gate House.) The house still stands at the gates of the Westerham Parish Church of St Mary the Virgin. His name is recorded in the baptism registry of St Mary's Church in 1503. Though much of the church has been renovated several times over the centuries, the original 14th-century font in which Frith was baptised is still used today. The John Fryth Room was added in the 1960s as a meeting room and there is a stone commemorative plaque in the church surrounds. The extended church choir are known as The John Fryth Singers.

He went to Sevenoaks Grammar School. He was further educated at Eton College before being admitted as a scholar to Queens' College, Cambridge, although he received his Bachelor of Arts degree as a member of King's. While Frith was at Cambridge, his tutor was Stephen Gardiner, who would later take part in condemning him to death. He became proficient in Latin, Greek, and Mathematics.

He also met Thomas Bilney a graduate student of Trinity Hall, and began to have meetings concerning the Protestant Reformation. It may have been at one of these meetings that Frith met with William Tyndale. After graduating in 1525, Frith became a junior canon at Thomas Wolsey's Cardinal College, Oxford. While in Oxford, Frith was imprisoned, along with nine others, in a cellar where fish was stored, due to his possession of what the University's officers considered "heretical" books. Frith was released and fled England, joining Tyndale who was then residing in Antwerp.

=== Residence in continental Europe ===
In 1528 he went to Marburg, where he translated Places by Patrick Hamilton. One year later, Frith translated A Pistle to the Christian Reader: The Revelation of the Anti-Christ; An Antithesis between Christ and the Pope. He also published A Disputacion of Purgatorye, divided into thre bokes in response to Thomas More, John Rastell, and Bishop John Fisher. Rastell was persuaded by this publication and adhered to the Protestant Reformation until his death. Frith explains in his A Disputation of Purgatory, that there are two purgatories, "God hath left us two purgatories; one to purge the heart and cleanse it from the filth which we have partly received of Adam … and partly added thereto by consenting unto our natural infirmity. This purgatory is the word of God, as Christ saith." The second purgatory is Christ's cross. "I mean not his material cross that he himself died on, but a spiritual cross, which is adversity, tribulation, worldly depression, [etc]." During this year of 1528 Frith also got married and had children.

=== Travels and acquaintances ===
When John Frith first began his studies at Cambridge University; he was tutored by Stephen Gardiner, who later became the Bishop of Winchester. Gardiner instilled a "love of learning" in the young Frith, and developed a so-called great loyalty and admiration for the youth. In later years, this loyalty toward Frith ended when Gardiner and Sir Thomas More began to criticize the church, but stopped when they realized that they were only adding fuel to the fire of the heretics. Frith was called out of Cambridge to attend Oxford University by Thomas Wolsey, who personally gathered young men who excelled in learning and knowledge. Oxford was the first place in which Frith was apprehended and committed to prison under suspicion of being in favor of Luther's doctrine. He was released a short time later.

After this, Frith went to London where he made acquaintance with William Tyndale. Tyndale had a huge influence on Frith's religious views, and the two encountered much danger for their stance on purgatory. The second time that Frith was imprisoned was when he went to see the Prior of Reading, a friend to whom he retreated when he ran out of money to live on. Upon arriving in Reading, Frith was taken for a vagabond and a rogue. Frith was arrested and put in the stocks. Frith was released with the help and persuasion of Leonard Coxe, who was schoolmaster in Reading, with whom he met and discussed topics such as education, Universities, languages, etc. Coxe went to the magistrates and got him freed because of his pity and admiration for Frith's intelligence and eloquence.

Sir Thomas More was the Chancellor of England at the time that Coxe had pushed for and gained Frith's freedom from imprisonment. He issued a warrant for Frith's arrest on a charge of heresy. Frith was sent to the Tower of London when he was caught trying to escape to Holland. While imprisoned in the Tower, Frith composed a book on his views of purgatory and presented it to a tailor named William Holt, a man who made his acquaintance there. Holt made out to be a friend and supporter of Frith's ideas, only to take the composition given him by Frith himself and bring it to the hands of More. Upon reading Frith's book, More wrote his own composition in response. Later More would condemn Frith to death, eventually burning him at the stake. Ironically, More was later imprisoned in that same Tower of London for refusing to acknowledge King Henry VIII as supreme head of the Church of England. He was found guilty of treason and beheaded.

=== Return to England and arrest ===
In 1532, he returned to England, and warrants for his arrest were issued by Thomas More (who at the time was Lord Chancellor). In October he was arrested by the local authorities before he could arrange passage to Antwerp, wearing an elaborate disguise at Milton. While imprisoned for approximately eight months in the Tower of London, Frith penned his views on Communion, fully knowing that it would be used "to purchase me most cruel death." John Foxe writes of John Frith and his works and writings and of the great chains that were piled onto his body. Frith, in his last days in London's Tower, writes a final book, the Bulwark. It has been suggested that Rastell is persuaded to convert to Frith's views on Christianity because of the meetings they had together, as well as this final book. Rastell was converted through Frith's final arguments in the Bulwark. The Bulwark is an impressive book in its theological content and in its style, at times relaxed, and at other times serious. Frith claims that men sin if the motives behind their good works were to gain favour with God. The emphasis, then, is placed on justification by faith.

Eventually transferred from the Tower to Newgate Prison, Frith refused to stop his controversial writing. When William Tyndale learned of Frith's plight, he tried to bolster the prisoner's spirits with a pair of letters that still survive. "If your pain", Tyndale counseled, "proves to be above your strength, pray to your Father in that name, and he will ease it."

=== Trial and death ===
Frith was tried before many examiners and bishops, including Thomas Cranmer, the recently appointed archbishop of Canterbury. He produced his own writings as evidence for his views that were deemed as heresy. He was sentenced to death by fire and offered a pardon if he answered positively to two questions: Do you believe in purgatory, and do you believe in transubstantiation? He replied that neither purgatory nor transubstantiation could be proven by Holy Scriptures, and thus was condemned as a heretic and was transferred to the secular arm for his execution on 23 June 1533. He was burned at the stake on 4 July 1533 at Smithfield, London, for, he was told, his soul's salvation. Andrew Hewet, an apprentice tailor, was burned with him. Henry VIII was excommunicated one week later.

== Polemical style ==
John Frith's writings are in answer to, or debate with, the beliefs of men such as Bishop John Fisher, Sir Thomas More, and John Rastell. In 1531 Frith published three attacks on the doctrines of purgatory and transubstantiation, which left him, according to his biographers, a wanted man. The first of these, A Disputacion of Purgatorye, answered the apologies for purgatory contained in Bishop John Fisher's Assertonis Lutheranae Confuatio (1525), in Sir Thomas More's The Supplicacion of Soules (1529), and in A New Boke of Purgatory (1530) by More's brother-in-law, John Rastell. John Frith was unique among the reformers of the early Tudor period in his predilection for polemics and the very weapons of controversy, many of which he fashioned from the figures of rhetoric.

To emphasize his opponents' venality and thus question the motives for their doctrinal position, he used sarcasm, irony, significatio, and praemunitio. To prejudice his readers against opponents' arguments he used praemunitio. A "coulour of Rhetorike"—because Frith uses so many colours to debate against his opponents—which plays an important part in Frith's controversial technique is praemunitio, the orator's preparation of the audience for some succeeding portion of his speech. Frith uses this device to prejudice his readers either against his opponent's entire work prior to dealing with it, or to prejudice them against a particular passage in that work he is about to cite. To impugn his opponents' competence, he answered them with the texts they themselves had cited.

== Legacy ==
Thomas Cranmer would himself later subscribe to Frith's views on purgatory, and published the 42 articles which explicitly denied purgatory. Frith's works were posthumously published in 1573 by John Foxe.

== Timeline ==
- 1503 Born in Westerham, Kent, England
- 1510 Frith and family moved to Sevenoaks
- 1520–22 Recorded to have attended Eton College
- 1522 Enrolled at Queens' College, Cambridge
- 1523 Transferred over to King's College, Cambridge
- 1525–28 Transferred to Thomas Wolsey's Cardinal College, Oxford to become a junior canon
- 1528 Imprisoned at Cardinal College in the institution's fish cellar by Cardinal Wolsey
- 1528 Roughly 6 months later, Cardinal Wolsey released surviving fish cellar prisoners on the paroling condition of residing within a 10-mile radius around Oxford
- 1528 Fled England for Antwerp
- 1528 Travelled to Marburg, Germany
- 1532 Returned to England and was imprisoned in the Tower of London for approximately 8 months
- 23 June 1533 Sentenced to death as a heretic and was transferred to Newgate Prison
- 4 July 1533 Publicly burned at the stake in Smithfield, London

== Bibliography ==
- John Frith: Forging the English Reformation by Herbert Samworth
- John Frith: His Final Year
- John Frith and the Claims of Truth

== Sources ==
- Merle d'Aubigné, J. H. (1866). History of the reformation in Europe in the time of Calvin. Vol. 4. Translated by Cates, William L. B. New York: Robert Carter & brothers. pp. 139–163, et passim.
- Merle d'Aubigné, J. H. (1877). History of the reformation in Europe in the time of Calvin. Vol. 6. Translated by Cates, William L. B. New York: Robert Carter & brothers. pp. 20 et passim.
- Merle d'Aubigné, J. H.; Bulkley, Charles Henry Augustus (1882). D'Aubigné's Martyrs of the reformation. Philadelphia: Presbyterian Board of Publication. pp. 109–142.
- Brian Raynor, James Jones (2000). John Frith: Scholar and Martyr. Read All Over. ISBN 1-871044-78-2.
- Tyndale, William, John Frith, and Thomas Russell. The Works of the English Reformers. Vol. 3. London: Printed for Ebenezer Palmer, Printed by Samuel Bentley, 1831. 1–473. At Google Books.
- Hillerbrand, Hans J. Christendom Divided: The Protestant Reformation. London: Hutchinson & Co. LTD, 1971.
- Routh, C.R.N. Who's Who in History, Vol. 2: England. London: Billing & Sons, LTD, 1966.
- Stephen, Leslie, ed. (1889). "Frith, John" . Dictionary of National Biography. Vol. 20. London: Smith, Elder & Co.
- Pineas, Rainer (1964). "John Frith's Polemical Use of Rhetoric and Logic". SEL: Studies in English Literature 1500–1900. 4 (1): 85–100. doi:10.2307/449329. ISSN 0039-3657. JSTOR 449329.10 Mar 2008
- Pineas, Rainer (1964). "Thomas More's 'Utopia' and Protestant Polemics". Renaissance News. 17 (3): 197–201. doi:10.2307/2858431. ISSN 0277-903X. JSTOR 2858431.10 Mar 2008
- Hagstotz, Gideon and Hilda. "Heroes of the Reformation." Hartland Publications. Virginia. 1951.
