= Middle English Bible translations =

Middle English Bible translations covers the age of Middle English (c. 1100–1500), beginning after the Norman Conquest (1066) and ending about 1500.

The most well-known and preserved translations are those of the Wycliffean bibles.

Between two and four Middle English translations of each book of the New Testament still exist, mainly from the late 1300s, and at least two vernacular Psalters, plus various poetic renditions of bible stories, and numerous translations of sections and verses in published sermons and commentaries. The cost and translation effort of complete bibles (pandects) favoured the production of selections and compilations of significant passages.

== Sources of Scripture ==
Historian Richard Marsden notes a mediated bible: "Although it is true that there was almost no direct translation of the Bible into the vernacular before the Wycliffites, we simply cannot ignore the astonishingly large and varied corpus of Bible-based vernacular works which had begun to appear from the very early years of the 13th century onwards, under ecclesiastical influence (largely in response to the demands of the Lateran Council of 1215 for a more proactive approach to educating the laity in spiritual discipline). They included universal Bible histories[...], metrical paraphrases of Old Testament biblical books, devotional texts, versions of the Psalms, Gospel narratives (canonical and apochryphal), and so on."

Historian James Morey, looking at "all Middle English poetry and prose that consisted largely of biblical material" wrote that "when taken as a whole nearly all of the Old and New Testaments exist in Middle English before the Wycliffites began their project in the 1380s," though "these contents are idiosyncratic and eclectic." The catalogs of medieval libraries show "frequent entries" for manuscripts of glossed books of the Bible. For Morey, "the Wycliffites are ‘first’ in their coordinated efforts to produce a complete scholarly English Bible" and their project was characterized by "care, prestige, and organization" rather than operating in a vernacular vacuum.

Sources of Scripture
	Oral	Interspersed in written works	Collated
Vocabulary	Dialect; custom; sermons	Interlinear; Glossed (e.g. Wycliffite Glossed Gospels)	Word-for Word translation (e.g., Wycliffite Early Version); the common word book Interpretation of Hebrew Names
Poetic	Prayers; dramas; song; recited poems	Alliterive (e.g., Ormulum); metrical (e.g English metrical homilies from manuscripts of the fourteenth century); Book of Hours	Psalters; Metrical (e.g., Middle English Metrical Paraphrase of the Old Testament), Stanzaic Life of Christ
Prosodic	Sermons; memorized passages; sayings; stories	Scholarship; commentary; written sermons; histories; literature; summaries (e.g. Middle English Bible Summary)	Gospel Books; New Testaments (E.g. Paues' Middle English Fourteenth Century New Testament); Bibles (e.g., Wycliffite Later Version); Gospel harmonies; Life of Christ paraphrases, anthologies

According to some historians, the culture was saturated with key biblical knowledge. For example, Chaucer's Canterbury Tales contains over 700 biblical allusions.

== Times ==
=== Linguistic diversity and flux ===
Language in Britain in the early second millennium was in considerable flux and diversity: the population of England used numerous dialects of four main languages: Old then Middle English, Old Norse then Anglo-Norman French, Medieval Latin, and Cornish. Cumbric may still have been spoken in some places in the North. The Anglo-Saxon royal courts were replaced by the Anglo-Danish, then the Anglo-Norman. In the early 1000s, following King Canute's ban, any residual use of English runes ceased, in favour of Latin script augmented with several runic characters, and some Old Norse features of the Northern dialects seeped Southwards. There was a lingering strong Anglo-Scandinavian influence on literature and culture.

The Norman Conquest caused a suppression of Anglo-Saxon (the last poem in Old English dates to 1104) and Anglo-Norman language contact influenced the development of Middle English. (Note: "The eleventh century, with its political convulsions resulting in the establishment of an alien rule and the partial suppression of the language of the conquered race, was hostile to literary efforts of any kind in the vernacular.")

A psaltery glossed with Anglo-Norman exists from about 1160. "About the middle of the fourteenth century — before 1361 — the Anglo-Normans possessed an independent and probably complete translation of the whole of the Old Testament and the greater part of the New." There are several references to a 14th century Cornish translation which, if it existed, was soon lost.

=== Factors against vernacular translation into Early Middle English ===
Early Middle English biblical literature was limited because

- the synthetic Anglo-Saxon Old English dialect continuum had broken down and was transitioning inconsistently to the analytic Middle English dialect continuum, in part with simplifications from Anglo-Norse in the Danelaw, with a duplicate Frenchified vocabulary,
- from 1066 to c. 1400 Anglo-Norman French was the official language of courts and government in quadrilingual England (which, from the 1300s evolved into Law French, only spoken in law courts and eventually only written), and the preferred language of the elite who could fund vernacular book production,
- Latin was the preferred classical, academic and church language throughout medieval Western Europe,
- poetic forms suited for oral transmission were more relevant to the partly-literate general population than prose,
- even by the late 1300s, writers doubted the expressiveness of Middle English: the writer of Chastisyng of Goddis Children preferred but did not insist on the view that biblical passages may not be translated into any vulgar word as the word stands without great circumlocution after the feeling of the first writers, which translated into Latin by the teaching of the Holy Ghost; and
- Cost. Even in the new, small Paris Bible format, over 50 animal skins were needed for the New Testament alone. Some historians see a rise of a literate middle class following the Black Death: this increased wealth and independence may have promoted demand for personal Bibles after the 1350s.

=== Format ===
- In and before the 1000s, most Bible codexes were the enormous corporate Great Bibles in Latin suited for display and public reading even at night.
- The 1100s saw the development of personal breviaries in Latin containing only readings in the liturgy.
- The 1200s saw an explosion of Bible production, in the Latin, in Europe as copying moved from being a monastic enterprise to also a commercial one. A pandect Bible format intended for personal use (liturgical, preaching, pastoral, university), the Paris Bible, was developed by the relatively new preaching orders and frequently copied as small, portable "pocket Bibles."
- However, the 1300s was the only fertile time for Middle English Bible translation, as now-stable Middle English became usable in court pleadings, and gained vocabulary and respectability under the influence of writers such as Chaucer.
- In the 1400s in England, publication of new unauthorized translations were banned, following the Lollard violence, and Middle English then transitioned to Early Modern English.

== Partial translations ==
=== Early ===
The focus of vernacular biblical material was the vivid or presentation of edifying or notable contents, rather than the provision of an exhaustive facsimile of the originals. This favoured treatment of narrative episodes and psalmody over abstract theology, and the use of poetic forms that aided memorization and oral recital. For a largely illiterate or semi-literate laity, vernacular scripture was always mediated orally, visually or melodically.

The 19,000 line Ormulum, produced by the Augustinian canon Orrm of Lincolnshire around 1150, includes partial translations and paraphrases of parts of the Gospels and Acts of the Apostles from Latin into the dialect of the East Midlands, perhaps intended as declaimed sermons. The manuscript is written in the iambic septenary meter.

Sample of Early Middle English from the Ormulum (Luke 1:5):

An preost wass onn Herodess daȝȝ
Amang Judisskenn þeode,
& he wass, wiss to fulle soþ,
Ȝehatenn Zacariȝe,
& haffde an duhhtiȝ wif, þhat wass,
Off Aaroness dohhtress;
& ȝho wass, wiss to fulle soþ,
Elysabæþ ȝehatenn.

A priest was in Herod's days
among the people kin of Judah,
& he was (to know the full truth)
called Zachariah,
& had a doughty wife, that was
of Aaron's daughters;
& she was (to know the full truth)
called Elizabeth.

A notable example of the transmission of biblical stories in a vernacular in flux is the c. 1850-line La Estorie del Euangelie, a Middle English poem that paraphrases the Nativity and Passion texts; it was reformulated in least seven quite different versions between the early 1200s to the early 1400s, each in different English dialects (East, West, South Midlands version, Northern, Southern and Southwest) and vocabularies (with Scandinavian words being replaced by French words over time). Some of the versions show signs of oral transmission with re-composition, and one of the versions may have been transcribed by a non-speaker of Middle English. Material from it found its way into the Northern Passion from the English South-West.

=== Mid ===
Paraphrases of many biblical passages are included in the 30,000 line Cursor Mundi, a world chronicle written about 1300.

The Stanzaic Life of Christ is a 10,840 line poem derived in large part from two Latin works Polychronicon (c. 1350) and the Golden Legend (c. 1260) and then quoted loosely in at least seven of the Middle English plays of the Chester Mystery Plays in the late 1300s.

- Richard Rolle of Hampole (or de Hampole) was an Oxford-educated hermit and writer of religious texts. In the early 14th century, he produced English glosses of Latin Bible text, including the Psalms. Rolle translated the Psalms into a Northern English dialect, but later copies were written in Southern English dialects.
- Around the same time, an anonymous author in the West Midlands region produced another gloss of the complete Psalms: the West Midland Prose Psalter.
- In the early years of the 14th century, a French copy of the Book of Revelation was anonymously translated into English.
- Prose works such as the Book to a Mother exist which are largely composed of biblical material.

=== Late ===
The late 14th century saw many independent or parallel efforts to translate biblical books. The preface to the King James Bible (1611) mentions "even in our King Richard the second's days, John Trevisa translated them [the Gospels] into English, and many English Bibles in written hand are yet to be seen that divers translated, as it is very probable, in that age." A long tradition exists that John Trevisa made a translation of at least the Gospels in the late 1300s, under the patronage of Thomas, Baron Berkeley. No trace of these now exists, unless they are related to e.g., the Wycliffite Later Version.

- Anna Paues (1904) edited a 14th century translation of most of the New Testament: the Epistles, Acts and part of the Gospel of Matthew which does not seem to be derived from the Wycliffite versions. She subsequently published yet another translation of the Catholic epistles. Historian Andrew Kraebel has suggested that the material was in part collated from various prior translations of individual books, as the main translator found works that would relieve his effort.
- The Paues book also discusses other manuscripts, such as MS. Pepys 2498 (Magdalene College, Cambridge) which has a Life of Jesus (or Gospel harmony) formed from Middle English translations of the 112 readings from the church evangeliary, perhaps itself though a French translation.
- Margaret Joyce Powell (1916) edited the non-Wycliffean Middle English commentary and translation of the Gospels of Mark and Luke, and the Pauline epistles, dating them to the late 1300s.
- Another non-Wycliffean commentary and translation of Matthew's Gospel exists in two manuscripts.

In the following table, the entry includes the translations given by John Wycliffe during a published sermon. Such oral translations were the usual way that churchgoers were exposed to scriptural texts. One theory of the Wycliffite Bibles is that they started as collations by followers of Wycliffe's sermon translations.

Note: in the following Middle English transcriptions, the character þ is equivalent to modern "th"; the character ȝ is equivalent to modern "gh". "u" and "v" have been adjusted for consistency, as have initial "i" and "j".

Comparison 1 Cor:13 4-7
Powell c. 138x?	Paues c. 136x?	John Wycliffe Sermon On Quinquagesme Sundai pistle c. 137x?	Wycliffite LV c.1394
4. Charytee is pacyent; he is benygne; charyte has none envye; he dose not overthwertly; he is not bolned with pride; 5. he is not coveytous; he seekys not þat hyse ben; he is not wrathed; he thenkys not evyl; 6. he has not joye over wyckydnesse; he joyes forsoþe to veryte; 7. Alle-thyng he suffres; alle thyng he belevys; alle thyng he hopis; alle thyng he susteynes.	4. Charite is pacyent & benygne; charite ne hateþ no man, ne doþ not wykkedlyche, ne is not y-blowe wiþ pruyde; 5. be ne is not coveytous, he ne secheþ noȝt his owne þinges, he ne is noȝt y-wraþþed, he ne þenkeþ non yvel, 6. ne joyeþ noȝt up-on wykkednesse, bote joyeþ to trewþe; 7. alle þinges he suffreþ, alle þinges he byleveþ, alle þinges he hopeþ, alle þinges he abydeþ.	4. charite is pacient...and þis is clepid benignite...charite haþ noon envie...it doiþ not amys...it bolneþ not bi pride.; 5. It is not coveitous... it sekiþ not his owne þingis...it is not stired to wraþþe... it castiþ not yvel.; 6. it joieþ not on wickednesse...it joieþ to treuþe...; 7. it suffriþ al þingis,...it trowiþ alle þingis...it hopiþ alle þingis...it susteyneþ al þingis	4. Charite is pacient, it is benygne; charite envyeth not, it doith not wickidli, it is not blowun, 5. it is not coveytouse, it sekith not tho thingis that ben hise owne, it is not stirid to wraththe, it thenkith not yvel, 6. it joyeth not on wickidnesse, but it joieth togidere to treuthe; 7. it suffrith alle thingis, it bileveth alle thingis, it hopith alle thingis, it susteyneth alle thingis.

Comparison 1 Cor:13 4-7
Adam Clark manuscript

(lost?)

Charite is pacient or suffering. It is benyngne or of good wille. Charite envyeth not. It doth not gyle it is not inblowen with pride

it is not ambyciouse or coveitouse of wirschippis. It seeketh not the thingis that ben her owne. It is not stirid to wrath it thinkith not yvil.

it joyeth not on wickidnesse forsothe it joyeth to gydre to treuthe.

It suffreth all thingis. it bileeveth alle thingis. it hopith alle thingis it susteeneth alle things.

XVI Points of Charity

(Lambeth MS 853, c. 1440)

Charite is pacient
Benigne
Ne envyose
Charite dooþ nevere wickidli
Ne blowen is with pride
Charite is not coveitose
Sche sechiþ not hir owne þing
Charitee wole no þing be wroþ
Charitee þenkiþ noon yvel
Of wickidnes charite is not glad
To riȝt & truþe is hir joiyng
Alle þingis sche beriþ up meekeli
Alle þingis sche trowiþ
Alle þingis sche hopiþ
Sche abidiþ alle þingis

(Each has 3 lines of poetic expansion)

For comparison:

Comparison 1 Cor:13 4-7
Vulgate (Latin)	Luther 1522 German	Tyndale (EModEng) c.1526	Rheims (EModEng) c.1582
4. Caritas paciens est; benigna est; caritas non emulatur, non agit periperam, non inflatur; 5. non est ambiciosa; non querit que sua sunt; non irritatur; non cogitat malum: 6. non gaudet super iniquitate; congaudet autem veritati; 7. omnia suffert; omnia credit; omnia sperat; omnia sustinet	Die liebe ist langmütig und freundlich, die liebe eyffert nicht, die liebe treybt nicht mutwillen, sie blehet sich nicht, sie stellet sich nicht ungebärdig, sie sucht nicht das yhre, sie lest sich nicht erbittern, sie rechnet das böse nicht zu, sie freuwet sich nicht uber der ungerechtickeyt, sie freuwet sich aber der warheyt, sie vertreget alles, sie glewbet alles, sie hoffet alles, sie duldet alles.	4. Love suffreth longe and is corteous. Love envieth not. Love doth not frowardly swelleth not; 5. dealeth not dishonestly seketh not her awne is not provoked to anger thynketh not evyll; 6. rejoyseth not in iniquite: but rejoyseth in ye trueth; 7. suffreth all thynge beleveth all thynges hopeth all thynges endureth in all thynges.	4. Charitie is patient, is benigne: Charitie envieth not, dealeth not perversly: is not puffed up, 5. is not ambitious, seeketh not her owne, is not provoked to anger, thinketh not evil, 6. rejoyceth not upon iniquitie, but rejoyceth with the truth: 7. suffereth al things, beleeveth al things, hopeth al things, beareth al things

Biblical manuscripts were often selections or anthologies with other material.

At the end of the Middle English period, William Caxton translated many Bible stories and passages from the French, producing the Golden Legend (1483) and The Book of the Knight in the Tower (1484). He also printed The Mirror of the Blessed Life of Jesus Christ by Pseudo-Bonaventure, translated by Nicholas Love, OCart.

== Psalms ==
The Psalms are a special case: as sung works of devotional poetry, rather than theological prose, there was a greater freedom for translators. The Sarum Psalter used the Vulgate (Gallican Psalter) however some psalms in the liturgy used the Old Roman Psalter.

There are five complete renditions of the Psalms into Middle English still existing (the Metrical, Rolle's, the Prose, and the Wycliffite EV and LV) and numerous translations of individual Psalms.

=== Primer Psalms ===
Primers were English vernacular prayer books (or Book of Hours) to assist preparation for the Use of Sarum Latin Mass. About half of these (c. 1400 to 1520) have Psalms derive from the Wycliffean Late Version (LV), but the other half have Psalms with translations from some other source(s), now lost, but perhaps owing something to the Wycliffean Early Version(s) (EV.)

Here is Psalm 6:1,2 from a 15th Century primer, in parts similar to one of the EV versions:

Lord, in þi wodenes (anger, rage) repreve (censure) not me
ne in þi wraþ sle (strike) not me
Lord have mercy on me for y am syk
hele me lord for my bones be togederstrublid (together disquieted)

== Complete translations ==
In the late 14th century, the first (known, extant) complete Middle English language Bible was produced, probably by scholars at Oxford University.

- The New Testament was initially completed by around 1380 and the Old Testament a few years later. It was a word-for-word translation of the Vulgate suited for scholarly reference. Some 30 copies of this Early Version (EV) Bible survive, with some variation.
  - The authorship is controversial among scholars. Traditionally, there was held to be some connection to John Wycliffe as inspiration or instigator or glossator or translator — hence it often called Wycliffe's Bible or Wycliffite Bibles. It is thought that a large portion of the Old Testament was translated by Nicholas Hereford.
- The EV was revised into more idiomatic Middle English suited for devotional use in the last years of the 14th century, perhaps by John Purvey. This Later Version (LV) has more manuscript copies than the earlier: some 130 copies exist, including some now belonging to the British royal family.
  - In the 1500s, the Wycliffean LV text was transcribed into Scots (a language with features of Northern Middle English and now Modern English) but the version was lost until recently.
- Modern scholars such as Henry Ansgar Kelly and Anne Hudson —following a view held by several earlier Catholic commentators including Thomas More and Francis Aidan Gasquet— argue that there is no evidence that these Middle English Bibles were heterodox products of Wycliffe and followers of his theology.
  - Proponents of this view suggest that they were orthodox Catholic translations that were "Wycliffied" over the years by partisan academics who uncritically accepted as legitimate and definitive the problematic so-called "General Prologue" that is found in only 8% of extant manuscripts.

=== Example ===
Here is a sample of the Wycliffite LV translation (changed with v instead of u):

Be not youre herte affraied, ne drede it. Ye bileven in god, and bileve ye in me. In the hous of my fadir ben many dwellyngis: if ony thing lasse I hadde seid to you, for I go to make redi to you a place. And if I go and make redi to you a place, eftsone I come and I schal take you to my silf, that where I am, ye be. And whidir I go ye witen: and ye witen the wey. (John 14:1-4)

=== 1400s requirement for authorization ===
From the time of King Richard II until the time of the English Reformation, individuals who owned Bibles with Lollard material, without authorization from their local bishop, could be investigated as potential Lollard heretical seditionists, and those who read or lectured publicly from that seditionist material publicly could be prosecuted for promoting heretical sedition. All dated copies are dated before the restrictions. Historian Mary Dove noted "Neither arguing in favour of an English Bible, nor assembling a collection of writings in favour of an English Bible, were intrinsically Wycliffite activities."

Historian Margaret Powell also notes "the Church's usual point of view; the actual making, possession, and reading of an English version are not condemned, provided that such a version is used as an aid to the study of the Latin text and not as a substitute for it." Books containing Lollard material, such as the so-called General Prologue found some manuscripts were eventually banned.

== Legacy ==
All translations of this time period were from Latin or French. The influence of oral and non-Wycliffean Middle English Bible translations and vocabulary on Early Modern English translations (i.e., related to William Tyndale) has not been studied.

Humanism of the Renaissance made popular again the study of the classics and the classical languages and thus allowed critical Greek scholarship to again become a possibility. Greek and Hebrew texts would become more widely available with Johannes Gutenberg's development of the movable-type printing press, with his first major work an edition of the Latin Vulgate, now called the Gutenberg Bible, in 1455. In the early 16th century, Erasmus published a single volume of the Latin and Greek texts of the New Testament books and continued publishing more precise editions of this volume until his death. The availability of these texts, along with renewed interest in the biblical languages themselves, enabled more scholars in their debates and exegesis to include philological considerations.

The other great event of that same century was the development of Early Modern English, making English a literary language, leading to a great increase in the number of translations of the Bible in that era.

== See also ==
- Wycliffe's Bible
- English translations of the Bible
