= Biblical paraphrase =

Retelling of the Bible

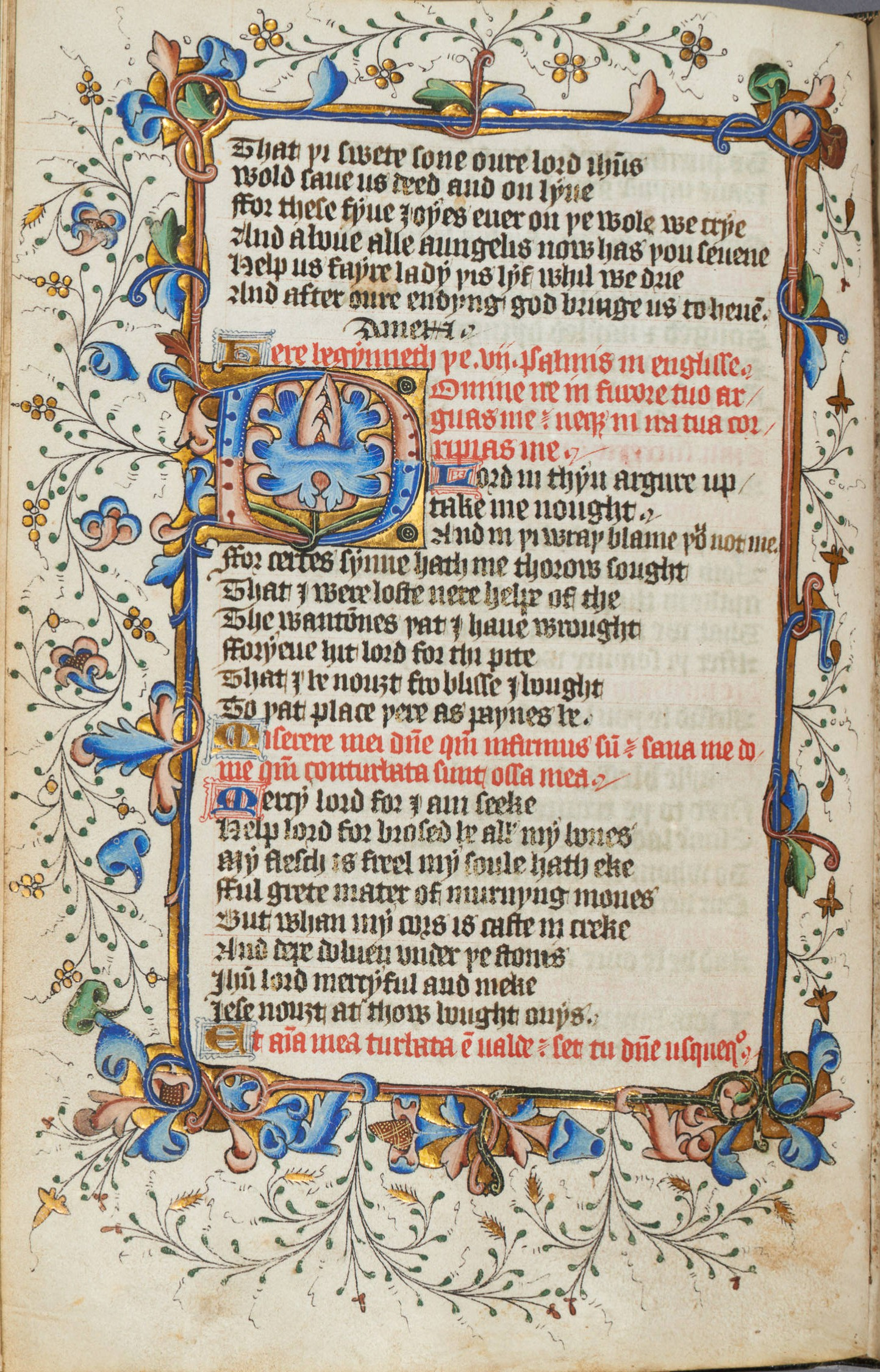
A manuscript page showing the beginning of Richard Maidstone's paraphrase of the penitential psalms.

Biblical paraphrase refers to the practice of restating scripture in new wording, in prose or verse, for purposes ranging from education and interpretation to devotion and literary artistry. Emerging from classical rhetorical traditions and Jewish interpretive practices such as the Targumim, Biblical paraphrase developed through the Middle Ages and early modern era into a genre that blended translation, commentary, and creative expansion. It served as a means of clarifying scripture, shaping theology, and engaging readers unable to access the Bible in its original languages. By the sixteenth and seventeenth centuries, paraphrase had become a literary and devotional genre, enabling both men and women writers to interpret biblical texts, express personal or political convictions, and take part of sacred narratives through art.

Christian paraphrase was part of early Christian literature, and appeared in sermons, homilies, and poetic retellings. Early narrative retellings, like Cursor Mundi and the Historia scholastica, influenced later paraphrase works. The Middle English Metrical Paraphrase of the Old Testament paraphrased multiple Biblical narrative sources. Paraphrases that followed the Bible's text more closely, especially the Psalms, became popular in the 15th century. In the early modern era, humanist scholarship renewed interest in paraphrase as a form of commentary, exemplified by Erasmus's influential paraphrases of New Testament books. English paraphrasers, including Thomas Wyatt, Philip Sidney, Mary Herbert, Anne Locke, and Anne Wheathill, used the form to clarify doctrine, express personal devotion, and engage with contemporary political and theological debates. Both Protestant and Catholic writers engaged in paraphrase in the sixteenth and seventeenth centuries, when it was a venue for literary experimentation as well as spiritual reflection.

== Background ==
Before the Bible existed, paraphrase was used as a tool for rhetorical and educational purposes in ancient Greece and Rome. Demosthenes practiced paraphrase on his own orations, according to Plutarch. Quintilian recommended paraphrase. These rhetoricians used paraphrase to improve their writing. In schools, verse by Homer and Virgil were commonly paraphrased. Paraphrase of verse "translates" the meaning stylistically into prose. Biblical paraphrase is when verses or chapters from the Bible are written in different words, often emphasizing a different aspect of the text than the original.

As a religious practice, Targumim, a Jewish tradition, was a paraphrase that performed interpretive work. Targumim often translated parts of the Hebrew Bible from Hebrew into a vernacular tongue like Aramaic. Many other examples of paraphrase exist within Jewish literature. One example is by Philo, who interspersed quotation of Genesis 2:1-6 with paraphrase.

The purpose and justification for biblical paraphrase varies depending on the time period and language of the work. In the Middle Ages, English biblical paraphrase was considered a kind of translation, where the translator was expected to add interpretation, expansion, or other inventions to the text. This was especially apparent in Middle and Modern English metrical psalters. In the sixteenth century, humanist studies of the Old Testament led to renewed interest in psalm interpretation. Since the book of Psalms was an extremely familiar text to English-speaking people at the time, readers could instantly mentally compare versions of psalms. While some psalm translations, like Thomas Beccon's, hoped to replace the study of secular poetry with psalm study, the most skillful poets created psalm paraphrases without condemning classical verse. Imitation through poetry (including paraphrase) was considered an art in itself. Biblical paraphrases from the 16th and 17th century did not replace Biblical study, but supplemented it as an exercise in comprehension. In John Dryden's Preface to Ovid's Epistles (1690), he defined paraphrase as "translation with latitude, where the author is kept in view by the translator, so as never to be lost, but his words are not so strictly followed as his sense, and that is to be admitted to be amplified, but not altered." He positioned paraphrase as a happy medium between metaphrase (close, literal translation) and imitation. According to R. V. Young in Doctrine and Devotion in Seventeenth-century Poetry, Biblical paraphrase allowed an author to "write his way into the sacred text," where "retelling of the biblical material turns into a retelling of the self." This assumption led many scholars to relate Biblical poetry to the author's biography. In contrast, Rivkah Zim in English Metrical Psalms cautioned readers that the psalm paraphrases did not always represent feelings of the poet themself.

== History ==
=== Early Church ===
Christian biblical paraphrase dates back to its earliest written history. They vary in their adherence to the meaning of the original text. Sometimes they reflected commonly accepted interpretations of passages, and sometimes they showed an original interpretation by the paraphrase's author. With metrical paraphrase, meaning could have been altered for the sake of more easily adhering to the demands of the poetic form.

Melito of Sardis, an early Christian prelate, wrote a paraphrase of Exodus as part of a Passover sermon. Gregory of Nyssa explained that his paraphrase of part of Psalm 57 was "for the sake of clarity." Other early Christian writings incorporated paraphrase in their homilies and other writings. Verse-by-verse paraphrase started in the fourth and fifth centuries, often using the meter of pagan poetry. Septuagint's hexameter paraphrase of the Psalms and Nonnus of Panopolis's of the gospel of John are two examples from Greek. In Latin, Juvencus and Paulinus of Nola both wrote biblical paraphrases.

=== Medieval ===
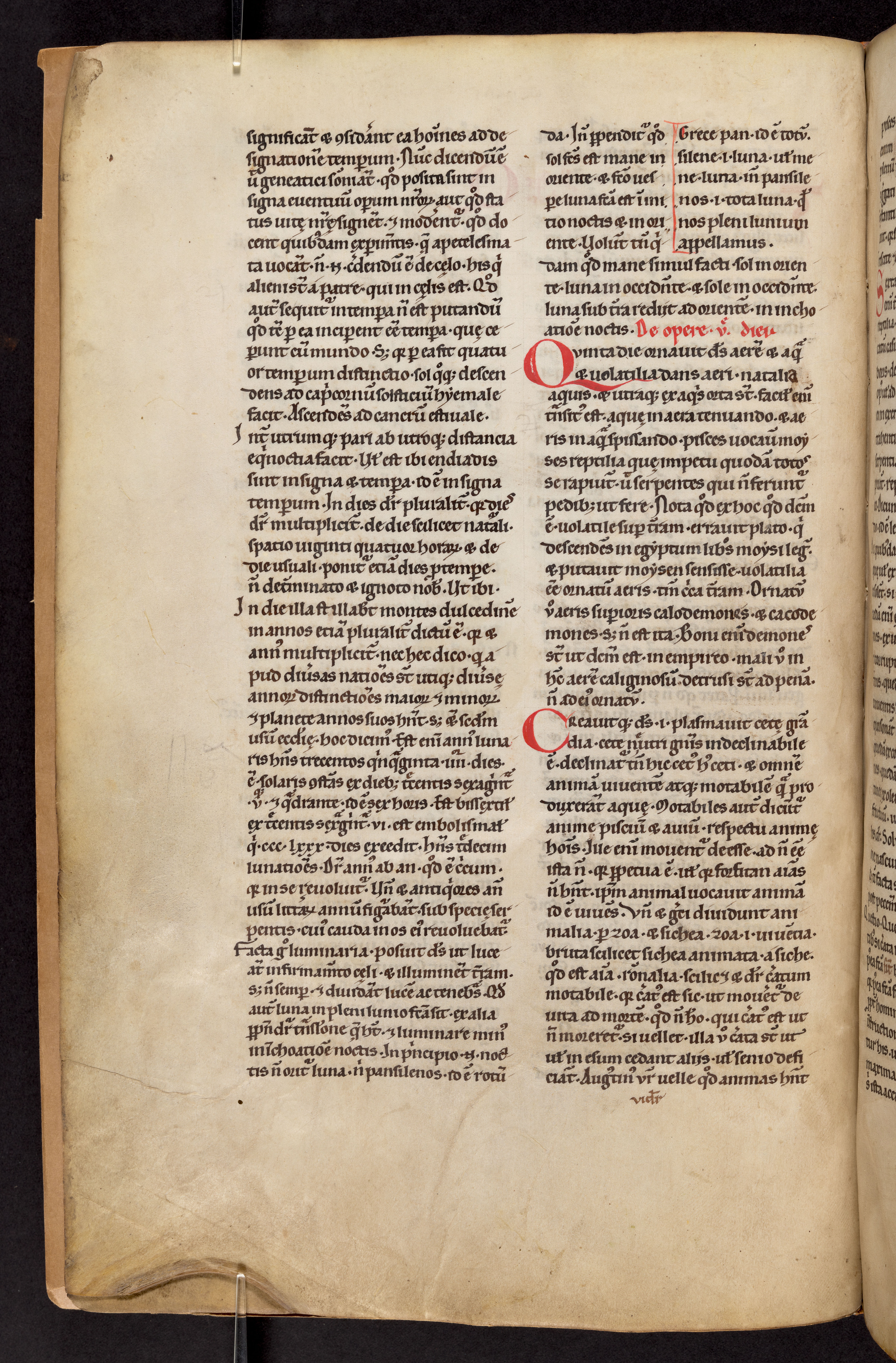
page from Historia scholastica

Biblical paraphrases in the 15th century had influences from earlier compositions that were closer to narrative retellings than verse-by-verse paraphrase. Cursor Mundi, a narrative poem that retells the stories in the Bible, was undergoing ongoing editing in the early 1400s, even though its composition had begun almost a century earlier. The Vernon Manuscript contained multiple biblical narratives in Middle English, including La Estorie del Euangelie, a harmonization of the gospels in verse, as well as translations of several psalms into Middle English by Richard Maidstone. The Historia scholastica was a popular Latin biblical narrative completed around 1170. The Middle English Metrical Paraphrase of the Old Testament, finished around 1380, paraphrased Historia Scholastica extensively. It also used Old French metrical paraphrase of the Old Testament and Cursor Mundi as source material. The motivation behind Paraphrase, according to its own text, was "for the uneducated men to understand quickly." Paraphrase also related Biblical events to current events in order for the scripture to be "at once ancient history and present reality." Generally, Middle English paraphrases of psalms made liturgically significant psalms legible to readers who did not know Latin. The earliest Middle English paraphrase of a psalm is from the 1330s in the Auchinleck Manuscript, and is of Psalm 50. The paraphrase appears alongside quotation of the Latin text and commentary.

The Arundel Constitutions, set forth in 1409, limited what lay people could read and write about scripture and its translation in parts of England and specifically at Oxford University. While commentary and translations were not allowed, biblical paraphrases were a popular way for lay readers to understand the Bible. Verse paraphrase made the Bible stories more memorable and easier to understand. During this period, biblical translation included glosses and commentary, and translators were simultaneously commentators. They often relied on previous Middle English translations of the Psalms, and the Wycliffe translations clearly influenced many paraphrases, even though the Wycliffe texts were considered heterodox. Individual penitential psalms were popular subjects of devotional paraphrase. Richard Maidstone and Thomas Brampton both wrote paraphrases of them in the 15th century, with both supplementing paraphrase of individual verses in poetry with commentary. Maidstone's poetic paraphrases were popular, especially his paraphrase of Psalm 50. Maidstone's paraphrases appear in over 20 manuscripts, with the majority being part of larger collections of devotional and quasi-liturgical texts. Brampton's paraphrases appear in manuscripts in a similar context.

=== Early modern ===
Erasmus, a Christian humanist, wrote prominent biblical paraphrases. Erasmus paraphrased whole chapters and books of the Bible, including Acts and Romans, in a more accessible Latin form. These were collected and published posthumously as the Paraphrases. Erasmus himself saw biblical paraphrase as " a kind of commentary" which extended and elaborated on the original text. Erasmus's paraphrases were translated into English. In the 1540s, Nicholas Udall oversaw translation of the New Testament paraphrases. Leonard Cox's translation of the paraphrase of Titus in 1534 had a clear political motive, as it emphasized the importance of obeying the king shortly after King Henry VIII married Anne Boleyn. Cox stated that the paraphrase would make all things "playne" (plain), in contrast to scholarly commentary.

Erasmus didn't believe that the Psalms could be paraphrased well, but many others in the medieval and early modern era wrote psalm paraphrases. George Joye published the first translation of the psalms into modern English in 1530, relying on Martin Bucer's Latin translation. Another Psalm paraphrase by Wolfgang Capito was translated into English by Richard Taverner. The Taverner-Capito Psalter (1539), like many paraphrases, made theological inferences plain, but relied on the paraphraser's interpretation of the psalm text. In this way, the paraphrase became a literary genre where Protestant men and women could exercise imaginative skills in a devotional act. Over 70 English translations of Psalms were printed during the 16th century. Thomas Wyatt, continuing the tradition of metrical paraphrase of penitential psalms, was inspired specifically by Pietro Aretino's penitential psalms, where the seven psalms follow seven preludes. Wyatt portrayed David in the traditional way, as a "lover and a sinner." Henry Howard, Earl of Surrey wrote metrical paraphrases of Psalms 55, 73, and 88, with themes of misery, betrayal, and a trial of his faith, likely written in December 1546, a month before his execution. Philip Sidney started a project to compose a metrical paraphrase for every psalm in the Book of Psalms, but died after only finishing Psalms 1-43. His sister, Mary Herbert, wrote paraphrases of the rest, which are collected in the Sidney Psalms. They used different verse structures for each psalm. The collection was highly respected by Sidney's contemporaries, but seen as an exercise in metrical creativity by later critics.

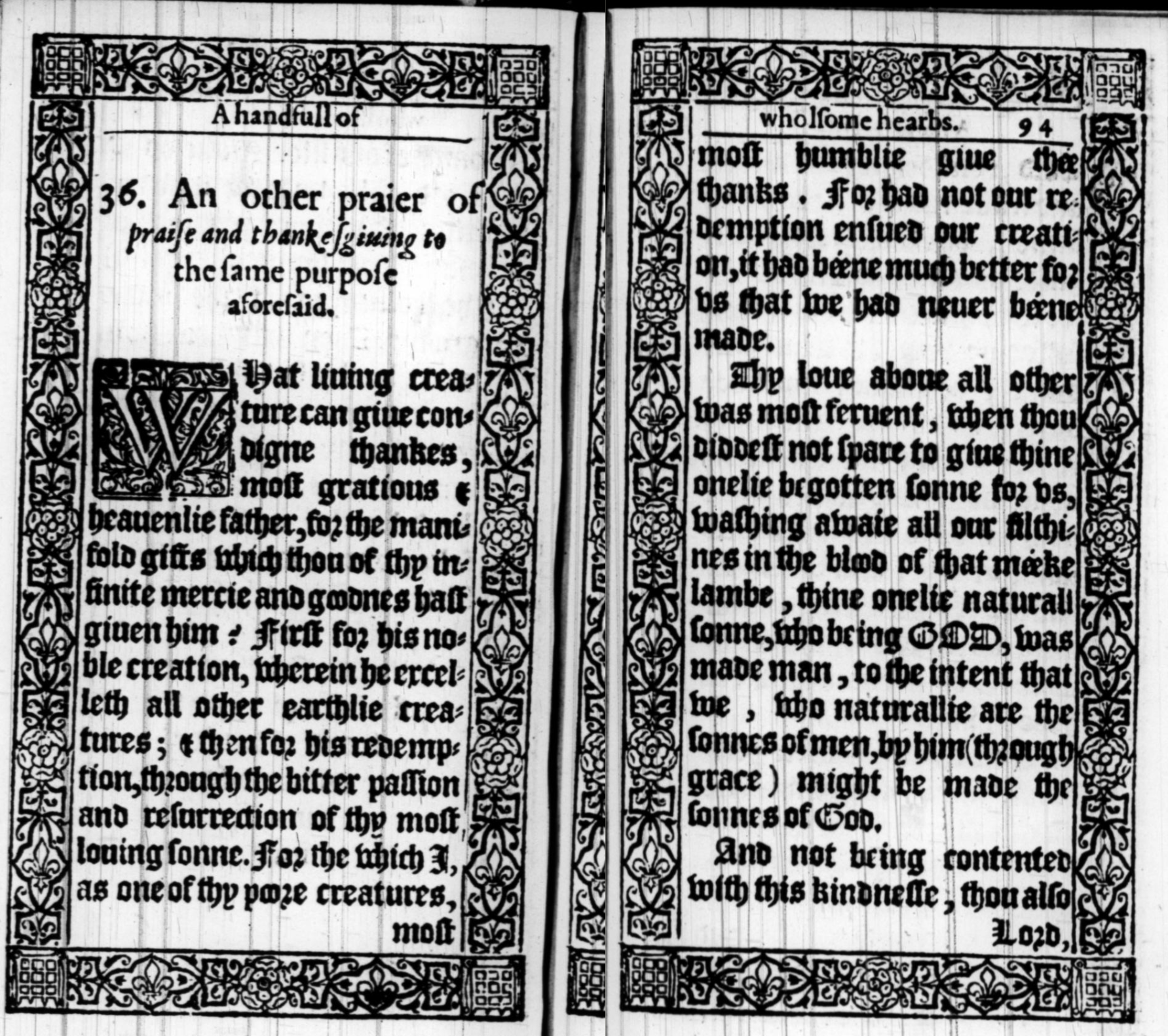
Prayer 36 from Wheathill's A hanfulll of hole-some (though homelie) hearbs, which includes a paraphrase of Psalm 23.

Protestant women composed paraphrases in the 16th century. Anne Locke paraphrased Psalm 51 in the form of a sonnet sequence in "A Meditation of A Penitent Sinner: Written in Maner of a Paraphrase." Her paraphrase expresses her own theological and political ideas. She compares Jerusalem to England and states that after Catholic Mary I of England's reign, England will be safe for Protestants once again. Anne Wheathill's collection of prose prayers, A Handfull of Holesome (though homelie) Hearbs includes a paraphrase of Psalm 23 and of Psalm 90. The paraphrases contain references to other parts of the Bible and show Wheathill's ideas about the creation, the fall, and redemption.

Devotional poetry and biblical paraphrase in the 17th century have been strongly associated with the Protestant Reformation. Protestant approaches to Bible study emphasized the importance of individual interpretation. However, R. V. Young, in his book Doctrine and Devotion in 17th-Century Poetry, argues that Erasmus and the humanist tradition influenced scholars to write Biblical poetry, translations, and paraphrases in both Catholic and Protestant traditions at this time.

=== 20th century ===
The Living Bible, first published in 1971, is a modern example of a paraphrase Bible.

== Works cited ==
- Faulkner, Andrew (2019). "Paraphrase and Metaphrase". In Blowers, Paul M.; Martens, Peter W. (eds.). The Oxford Handbook of Early Christian Biblical Interpretation. Oxford University Press. pp. 210–220. ISBN 9780191787782.
- Felch, Susan M. (2011). ""Halff a Scrypture Woman": Heteroglossia and Female Authorial Agency in Prayers by Lady Elizabeth Tyrwhit, Anne Lock, and Anne Wheathill". In White, Micheline (ed.). English Women, Religion, and Textual Production, 1500-1625. Ashgate Publishing, Ltd. ISBN 978-1-4094-0651-8.
- Matsuda, Takami (2023). "Biblical Paraphrase and Poems of Religious Instruction". In Boffey, Julia; Edwards, Anthony Stockwell Garfield (eds.). The Oxford History of Poetry in English: Volume 3. Medieval Poetry: 1400-1500. Oxford University Press. ISBN 978-0-19-883968-2.
- Prickett, Stephen (1986). Words and The Word: Language, poetics, and biblical interpretation. Cambridge University Press. ISBN 0521322480.
- Sutherland, Annie (2015). English Psalms in the Middle Ages, 1300-1450. Oxford University Press. ISBN 978-0-19-872636-4.
- Young, R. V. (2000). Doctrine and Devotion in Seventeenth-century Poetry. Cambridge: D. S. Brewer. ISBN 0859915697.
- Zim, Rivkah (1987). English metrical psalms: poetry as praise and prayer, 1535 - 1601. Cambridge: Cambridge Univ. Press. ISBN 9780521172219.
