= Wycliffe's Bible =

Middle English translations of the Bible

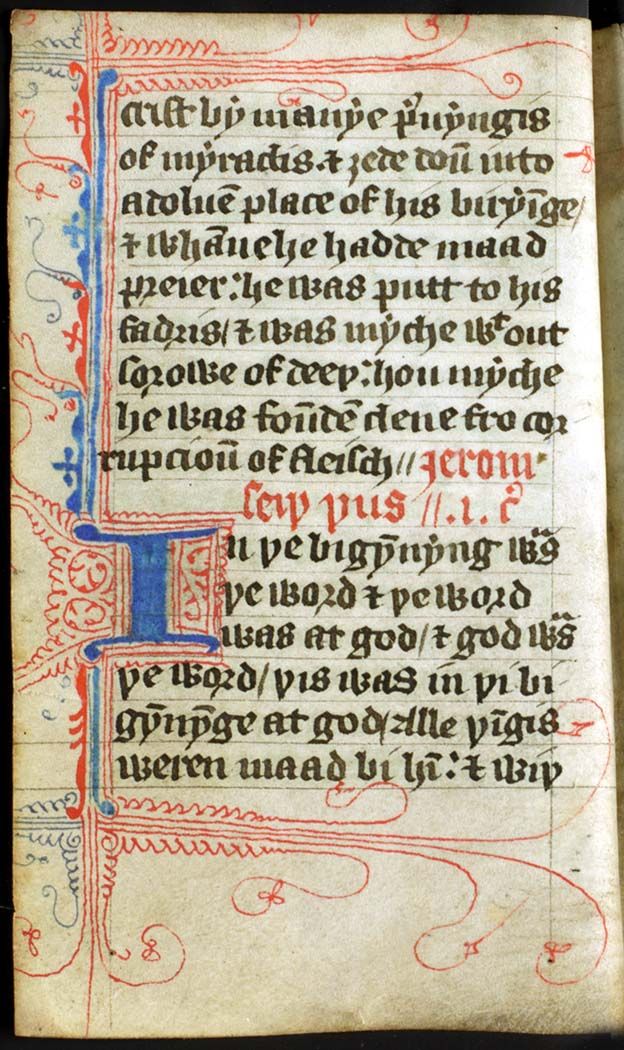
- Complete Bible published: 1382
- Online as: Wycliffe's Bible at Wikisource
- Derived from: Latin Vulgate
- Translation type: Formal equivalence
- Revision: 1388, (Note: As a New Testament portion) 1395
- Genesis 1:1–3 In þe bigynnyng God made of nouȝt heuene and erþe. Forsoþe þe erþe was idel and voide, and derknessis weren on the face of depþe; and the Spiryt of þe Lord was borun on the watris. And God seide, Liȝt be maad, and liȝt was maad. John 3:16 For God louede so þe world, that he ȝaf his oon bigetun sone, þat ech man þat bileueþ in him perische not, but haue euerlastynge lijf.

Wycliffe's Bible (also known as the Middle English Bible [MEB], Wycliffite Bibles, or Wycliffian Bibles) is a sequence of orthodox Middle English Bible translations from the Latin Vulgate which appeared over a period from approximately 1382 to 1395.

Two different but evolving translation branches have been identified: mostly word-for-word translations classified as Early Version (EV) and the more sense-by-sense recensions classified as Later Version (LV). They are the earliest known literal translations of the entire Bible into English (Middle English); however, several other translations, probably earlier, of most New Testament books and Psalms into Middle English are extant.

The authorship, orthodoxy, usage, and ownership has been controversial in the past century, with historians now downplaying the certainty of past beliefs: that the translations were made by controversial English theologian John Wycliffe of the University of Oxford either personally or with a team including John Purvey and Nicholas Hereford to promote Wycliffite ideas, or were created for use by Lollards for public reading at their clandestine meetings, or contained heterodox translations antagonistic to Catholicism.

The term "Lollard Bible" is sometimes used for a version of Wycliffite Bible with inflammatory Wycliffite texts added. At the Oxford Convocation of 1408, it was solemnly voted that in England no new translation of the Bible should be made without prior approval.

== Manuscripts ==
Wycliffite Bible texts are the most common manuscript literature in Middle English that still exist. (The second-most common manuscript is Nicholas Love's Meditations on the Life of Christ which Bishop Arundel promoted as an alternative to Wycliffite lives of Christ.)

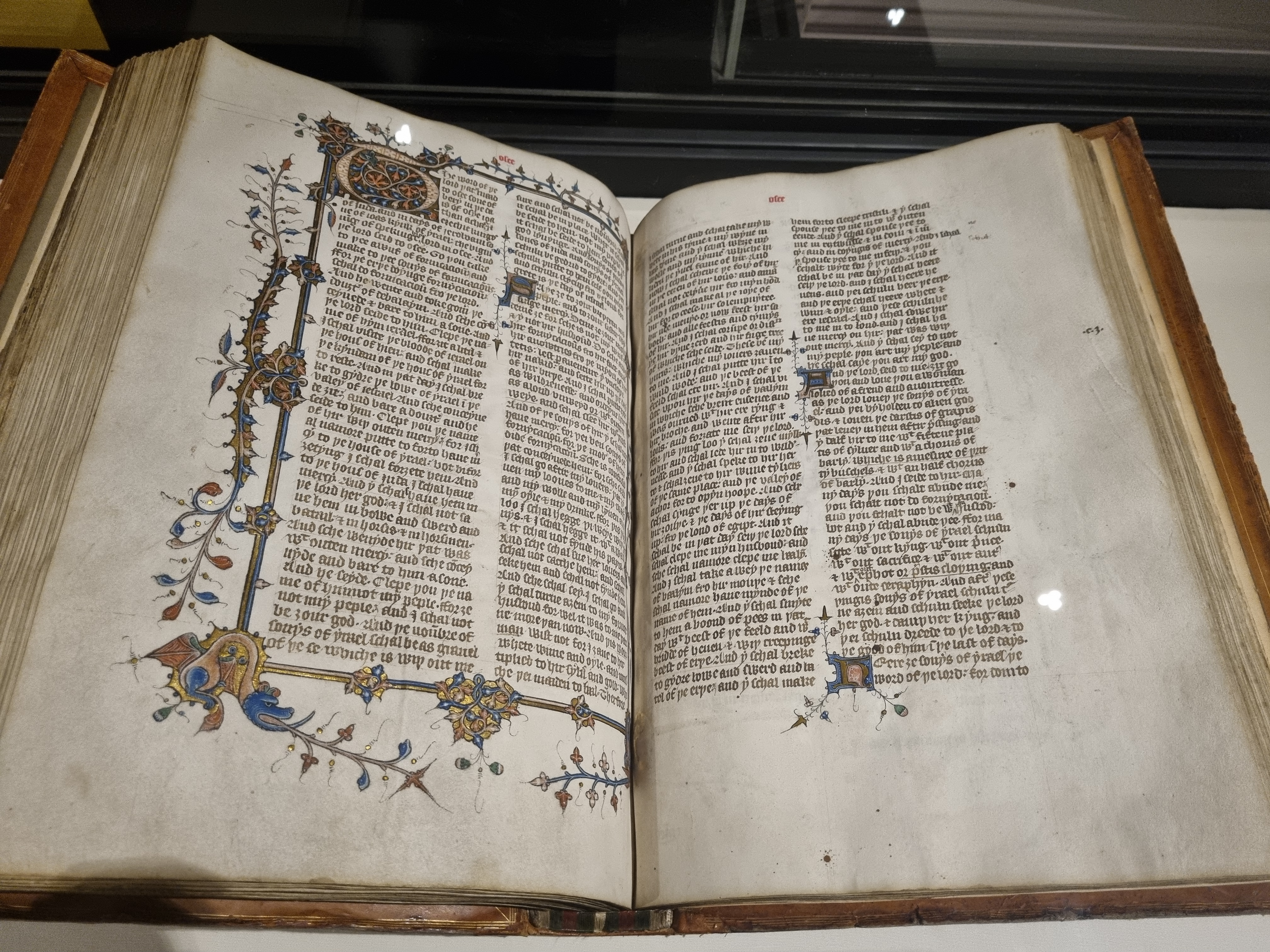
Wycliffe's Bible in the British Library

Over 250 so-called Wycliffite manuscripts survive; only 20 of these are or were complete bibles; two thirds have New Testament material only, with no additional material. Other manuscripts are gospel harmonies, concordances, lectionaries and collections: some of these books contain other material, usually orthodox, but occasionally Wycliffite or Lollard works, sometimes sanitised.

The plain text of all four gospels survives in twenty full Bibles, ninety-three complete New Testaments, and at least twenty-six manuscripts with only parts of the New Testament.

— Mary Rashko (2017)

In the first half of the 15th century, production moved to London, and produced smaller, more practical formats in textura hand.

Many of the manuscripts have apparatus to link to the Sarum liturgical calendar and were apparently commissioned by clerical or religious patrons for professional use: about 40% have tables of lections (lists of Scripture readings) indicating that the manuscripts were used in conjunction with the Mass or preparation of sermons. Notably the Latin of these Old Testament Lectionary readings is sometimes different to the Vulgate, coming from the Sarum Missal, and some have different translations from either the Early or Late Wycliffite versions.

== Owners and users ==
Modern scholars have questioned previous beliefs that the Wycliffite manuscripts were primarily made for or used by lay Lollards: historian Anne Hudson, in asking about various so-called Wycliffite literature "How clear is their ideological affinity to Wycliffite views?", mentions the "wide circulation of the Wycliffite bibles beyond those who credibly could even distantly be associated with Lollardy...the text was not in any way heretical even if it had been hereticated" (i.e. by the addition of non-Biblical texts.)

40 percent of manuscripts were illuminated intended for presentation or aristocratic use; copies are known for the Duke of Gloucester, by the brother of Henry V, by Henry VI, Henry VII, and so on. Others had fancy or rubricated initial letters. Some of these have extensive commentary in marginalia.

Historian Elizabeth Solopova notes "in spite of many polemical claims that the translation would benefit the 'poor', 'simple' and 'illiterates', at the time when the production of WB had peaked in the first half of the 15th century the conditions for a wide use of the vernacular Bible by the laity were not yet fully established. And on the contrary, it appears that in spite of censorship there was scope for a legitimate and sophisticated use of the vernacular translations by the clergy and in religious institutions. The traditional view of the vernacular as the language of the laity and a medium that typified the 'unlearned' may need to be modified."

As well, many of the Middle English vernacular primers (or Book of Hours) of the time, books associated with aristocratic nuns, provided versions of the so-called Wycliffite text for their Psalms or scripture readings.

One copy sold at auction on 5 December 2016 for US$1,692,500.

== Text versions ==
Surviving copies of Wycliffe's Bible fall into two broad textual families, the highly literal Early Version(s) (EV) in "grammatically careful English" and the "generally more idiomatic" but odd Later Version(s) (LV). A wide variety of Middle English dialects are represented.

There exist only a very few copies with EV texts. Various explanations for the two version have been suggested by scholars: that the EV was a textual preparation for the LV which escaped into the wild; that the EV was intended to help new clergy with their university studies and exegesis, perhaps as product of the Oxford Franciscans independent of Wycliffe's circle, but then perhaps revised as the LV by Wycliffe's circle (who were not necessarily Wycliffites) e.g. at Merton College; or that the rapid change in Middle English in the 14th Century meant that the EV vernacular translations could not remain unrevised; or the EV was likely aimed toward the weakly-literate members of the clergy or the common folk by accompanying their Vulgate reading, while the LV may have been aimed toward all literates and for public reading. Both versions are characterized by a close regard to the word order and syntax of the Latin base text: the word order being traditionally suspected of being divinely inspired.

The number of LV manuscripts is much larger than the number of EV manuscripts. Some manuscripts mix books of the Bible from the earlier version with other books of the later version. Some scholars speculate that the EV may have been meant as a rough draft that was gradually improved by various scholars into the somewhat better English of the second version.

The translators worked from the Vulgate, the Latin Bible that was the standard Biblical text of Western Christianity, often following the standard Paris Bible arrangement, and without reference to or knowledge of Greek or Hebrew.

The manuscripts that are pandects (complete Bibles) include the Catholic deuterocanonical books (called the Biblical apocrypha by most Protestants) plus 3 Esdras (which is also called 1 Esdras), and also included the noncanonical Epistle to the Laodiceans.

The manuscripts that are New Testament only frequently have Old Testament Lectionaries, which are drawn from the text of the Sarum Missal rather than the Vulgate.

=== Examples ===
The LV, though somewhat improved, still retained a number of infelicities of style, some of which may reflect the contemporary transitions in Middle English grammar, as in its version of Genesis 1:3 below. Orthography was in flux as well.

- Vulgate – Latin:
  - "Dixitque Deus fiat lux et facta est lux"
- Wycliffe EV – Middle English:
  - "And God seıde, Be maad lıȝt; and maad is lıȝt"
- Wycliffe LV – Middle English:
  - "And God seide, Liȝt be maad; and liȝt was maad"
- Douay–Rheims NT – Early Modern English:
  - "And God said: Be light made. And light was made"

The familiar verse of John 3:16 is rendered in various English versions as:

- Vulgate – Latin:
  - "Sic enim Deus dilexit mundum, ut Filium suum unigenitum daret : ut omnis qui credit in eum, non pereat, sed habeat vitam aeternam."
- Rushworth Manuscript (c. 950) – Old English (Mercian):
  - "Swa forðon lufade god ðiosne middengeard // þte sunu his ancenda gisalde // þt eghwelc soðe gilefeð in hine ne losað // ah hifeð lif ecce"
- Wessex Gospels (c. 950 – c. 1175) – Old English (West Saxon):
  - "God lufode middan-eard swa // þæt he sealde hys akennedan sune // þæt nan ne forwurðe þe on hine gelefð. Ac hæbe þt eche lyf."
- Wycliffe EV (c. 1382) – Middle English:
  - "Forsoþe god lovede so þe worlde, þat he ȝave hıs one bıgotun sone, þat ech man þat bıleveþ into hym perısche not, but have everlastynge lıȷf."
- Wycliffe LV (1394) – Middle English:
  - "For God lovede so the world, that he ȝaf his oon bigeten sone, that ech man that bileveth in him perische not, but have everlastynge lıȷf."
- Tyndale (1530s) – Early Modern English
  - "For God so loveth the worlde yt he hath geven his only sonne that none that beleve in him shuld perisshe: but shuld have everlastinge lyfe."
- King James Version (1611) – Early Modern English:
  - "For God so loved the world, that he gave his only begotten Son, that whosoever believeth in him should not perish, but have everlasting life."

=== Early Version ===
The first translations (EV) are rigid and literal translations of the Vulgate.

The existing manuscripts of the EV vary considerably from one another, showing revision. Historian Conrad Lindberg established that there were two stages to the EV: for the word ponder (conferens) in Luke 2:19, an initial EV using technical words (such as mētynge) and a subsequent EV using more literal terms (such as berynge to-gidere: bearing together); the LV used Þouȝte (thought).

The EV may have begun as a Middle English "gloss" on the Latin text, similar to the Vespasian Psalter. It typically kept the order of individual words unchanged from the Latin, which could lead to confusion or meaninglessness in English. It has been described as unintelligible without reference to the original Latin Vulgate. For example, the phrase "Dominum formidabunt adversarii ejus" in 1 Samuel 2:10 was translated as "The Lord shulen drede the aduersaries of him" in the first version, then revised to "Aduersaries of the Lord schulen drede him" in the second version. John Stacey points out that "The scribe's desire to keep the words in their original order was stronger at this point than his regard for the rules of grammar."

The manuscript often taken as the original was written by five different people and ends at Baruch 3:20. These authors used different forms of words, such as loving vs lufand or luvend, making it unlikely that they were merely different scribes performing dictation. The finished first translation contains a noticeable change in style after Baruch 3:20. Two surviving manuscripts mark this verse with notes: one reads "Explicit translacionem Nicholay de herford" and another "Here endith the translacioun of N, and now bigynneth the translacioun of J and of othere men". Hereford fled England for Rome in 1382, returning in 1391, and the J who took over may have been John Trevisa or John Purvey. These notes suggest that Wycliffe did not personally produce this entire translation, and may not have written any of it.

For example, Psalm 6:2-3 in one EV version (closer to modern orthography) is:

Lord, in thi wodnesse (anger, rage) undernim (rebuke) thou not me;
Ne in thi wrathe chastise thou me.
Have mercy of me, Lord, for I am syk;
Hele me, Lord, for disturbid ben alle my bonys.

And in another EV version:

Lord, in thi woodnesse (anger, rage) undernyme (rebuke) nouȝt me;
Ne in thi wraththe blame nat me.
Have mercy of me lord for y am syyk;
Hele me lord, for alle my bones been trowbled.

=== Later Version ===
The Later Version (LV) was issued 8 to 12 years after Wycliffe's death. This version has been subsequently attributed to John Purvey. It is generally more idiomatic English and takes more liberties with the Vulgate text. Nevertheless, the translation itself was never attacked for misleading word choices the way that William Tyndale's early translations were.

For example, Psalms 6:1-2 is

Lord repreve thou not me in thy strong veniaunce (vengeance):
neither chastise thou me in thin(e) ire.
Lord have mercy of me for I am sijk
make thou me hool: for alle my boness be troblid.

== Associated works ==
Historian Mary Raschko attributes to Wycliffites three primary forms of gospel literature:

- "close translation of the Vulgate,
- close translation interpolated with exegetical commentary, and
- harmonization of the four gospels into a single narrative" (i.e., the "Lives of Christ" One of Four and the Glossed Gospels.)

Anne Hudson identifies five groups of Wycliffite literature:

- the Wycliffite Bible translation;
- the glossed gospels;
- the collection of distinctiones (famous historical interpretations of religious/biblical terms and phrases) known as the Floretum and, in an abbreviated version, the Rosarium;
- the revisions to Rolle's Middle English Psalter;
- the 294 sermons of the English Wycliffite Sermon Cycle.

=== Wycliffe's commentaries ===
Wycliffe's early Postilla super totam Bibliam were brief commentaries or notes on the whole Bible.

Wycliffe later wrote several long exegetical commentaries on Revelation and the four Gospels which included Middle English translations of the passages being discussed. To these were added translations of most of the Catholic Epistles. As well, some of his English tracts or works included translations.

One theory of the production of Wycliffe's Bible is that these passages were extracted, collated, and completed by others to form the basis of the EV.

=== Glossed Gospels ===
After the EV was completed, John Purvey (attrib.) supplemented its translation of the Gospels with extensive commentary. Some of this commentary was original, but most was translated from earlier commentaries, especially Thomas Aquinas's Catena Aurea. The complete version, known as the Glossed Gospels, consisted of more than 90 percent commentary. Following medieval idiom, the glosses characterize "multiple, often figurative meanings as integral to the text": "It asserts that scripture is always more than what the basic text immediately communicates."

Only one supposedly heretical teaching has been identified; in one copy, the commentary on Luke 17:19 purportedly promotes a doctrine like salvation by faith alone. Despite this, Queen Anne of Bohemia received a copy and submitted it to Thomas Arundel, then Archbishop of York, who approved it. Arundel publicly reiterated his approval at Anne's funeral in 1394.

=== Oon of Foure gospel harmony ===
The Oon of Foure was a gospel harmony in Middle English, a translation of Clement of Llanthony's 12th-century Latin work Concordia quattuor evangelistarum, itself a collection of mainly patristic exegetical fragments whose extracted biblical passages often deviate from the Vulgate.

A scholar has suggested the translation represents an intermediate translation project between the literalisms of the EV and the modernisms of the LV. In most manuscripts, the One of Four was followed by Wycliffite Middle English epistles or works by Wycliffe.

There may be some confusion here with the Monotesseron gospel harmony, whose translation is sometimes attributed to Wycliffe, but which otherwise may have been based on Jean Gerson's 1420 work of that name.

=== Trevisa's Gospels ===
The preface to the King James Version of 1611 mentions that "even in our King Richard the second's days, John Trevisa translated them [the Gospels] into English, and many English Bibles in written hand are yet to be seen that divers translated, as it is very probable, in that age." William Caxton in 1482 also mentioned a translation of the bible into English by Trevisa.

However, no such Gospels or Scriptures now exist; it may be a mistake, they may have been lost to time, or be the texts now known as the Wycliffian Early Version. Trevisa also translated Scriptures into Anglo-Norman French, the tongue of his aristocratic patron Lord Berkeley. Some confusion also exists that he translated scriptures into Cornish.

=== General Prologue or Four and Twenty Books ===
Ten LV manuscripts begin with a so-called General Prologue (GP, also known as Four and Twenty Books) written by "Simple Creature" that has also subsequently been attributed to Purvey from either 1395 or 1396. This prologue, analogous to the Prologus Galeatus, advocates reading the Old Testament, summarizes its books and relevant moral lessons, and explains the medieval four senses of Scripture and the interpretation rules of Augustine of Hippo and Isidore of Seville.

The writer of the prologue also explains the purported methodology of translating holy scriptures. He describes four rules all translators should acknowledge:

Firstly, the translator must be sure of the text he is translating. This he has done by comparing many old copies of the Latin bible to assure authenticity of the text. Secondly, the translator must study the text in order to understand the meaning. Purvey explains that one cannot translate a text without having a grasp of what is being read. Third, the translator must consult grammar, diction, and reference works to understand rare and unfamiliar words. Fourth, once the translator understands the text, translation begins by not giving a literal interpretation but expressing the meaning of the text in the receptor language (English), not just translating the word but the sentence as well.

— F.F. Bruce,

However, the reliability of the GP has been questioned because its statements do not square well with other evidence. This method does not mention the EV at all, nor does it mention other translators, leading to scholarly doubts about either the connection of the LV with the EV, or the connection of the GP and the LV: "Simple Creature, far from being a major participant in the translation project, was a wannabe." One suggested resolution is that the GP relates to a now lost revision between the EV and LV. Another is that it was an introduction to the Old Testament translation only.

The GP also contains polemical anti-clerical material that seems to relate to the restrictions of a later period: "for though greedy clerks (clergy) are wooden by simony, heresy, and many other sins, and despise and stop holy writ, as much as they can, yet the commoners cry after holy writ, to know it, and keep it, with great cost and peril of their lives."

== History ==
There are three alternative narratives about the so-called Wycliffite translations:

- The oldest narrative is that John Wycliffe, as the "Morning Star of the Reformation", and his household created the first translation of the Bible into English, with a view of making it available to laymen and to break the power of the church, with copies primarily circulating among Latin-illiterate Lollards.
- The more recent scholarly opinion is that while Wycliffe or Wycliffites may have instigated or boosted the initial effort, it was conducted by multiple scholars at Oxford, not necessarily all Wycliffites, with its novelty coming from its more systematic and academic basis, and intended for orthodox, academic and clerical use. Wycliffe is seen as part of a broader revival of English academic exegesis "in the last quarter" of the 14th century, including Oxford theologians such as Richard Ullerston and William of Woodford. According to historian Mary Dove, there has been a neglected culture of medieval English biblicism outside Wycliffite circles.
- A revisionist Catholic narrative, starting from Thomas More, is that there was already an independent history of English translations (of books, verses, phrases and words), which were supplanted by or re-worked into the so-called Wycliffite texts; these older or independent versions were, to some extent, mis-identified as Wycliffite productions for Catholic then Protestant polemical purposes. Most of these older manuscripts have been lost or destroyed, e.g., during the Lollard suppression, the Tudor reformation, and the Puritan revolution. There are no unorthodox translations in the scriptural portions of the manuscripts that can be attributed to the ideas of Wycliffe or Lollardy.

The precise nature of Wyclif's connection with the production of the first English bible is shrouded in mystery [...]. To begin with, there is an almost total absence of reliable contemporary evidence.

— Michael Wilks

=== Historical context ===
In the Middle Ages, most Western Christians encountered the scriptures primarily in the form of oral versions of scriptures, verses and homilies in Latin (other sources were mystery plays, usually performed in the vernacular, public preaching by traveling friars, and popular iconography).

The native Anglo-Saxon writing system, runes, was designed for inscribing on wood and stone, not for books, and eventually contributed to the English Latin alphabet, allowing the writing of Old and Middle English.

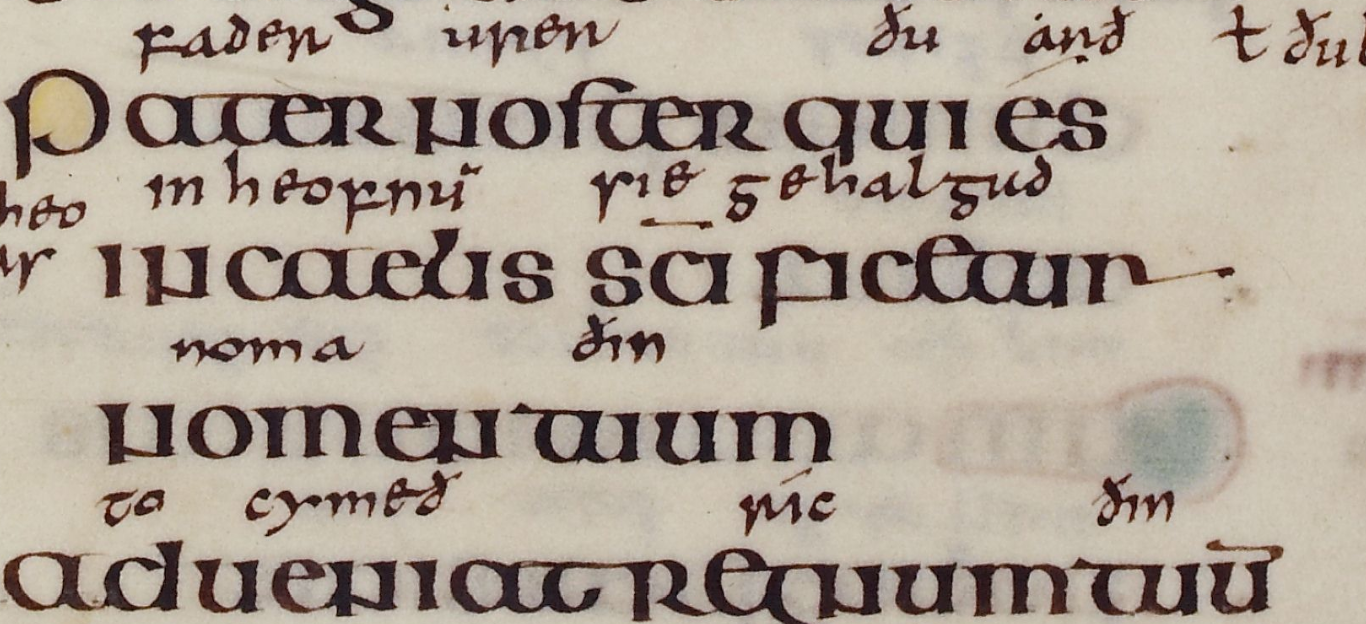
Example of Glossing: The Lord's Prayer (Pater noster) from Lindesfarne Gospels (698) with word-for-word Old English glosses (ca.970) by Aldred the Glossator

The earliest written-English versions of scripture were not translations but "glosses" on portions of the Latin Vulgate, such as the Vespasian Psalter. These glosses translated individual words and were used to help student monks to understand the primary Latin, but the word-for-word Old English annotations were not intended to necessarily form coherent sentences and sometimes could not be meaningfully read aloud or understood independently of the Latin.

The Venerable Bede translated the Gospel of John into Old English (Anglo-Saxon) in 735 (now lost), which John Purvey would later cite as precedent when Wycliffe's version was challenged by the church. Other precursor translations include the Wessex Gospels, written in the 10th century: copies were still being made up to 1175.

Ælfric of Eynsham adapted various Old Testament books into Old English, including the Old English Hexateuch, but they were often abridged and summarized. By modern standards, they were more akin to adaptations or paraphrases than translations. A primary Anglo-Saxon genre was the memorized epic poem suited for lengthy recitation by specialist declaimers, so attempts were made to render biblical histories as poetry, rather than prose, such as the Old English Junius manuscript, the Early Middle English Ormulum, the Middle English Metrical Paraphrase of the Old Testament and the Metrical Paraphrase of the Gospels (1300).

In the same century as Wycliffe, Richard Rolle translated the Psalms into the Middle English, using the same word-for-word literal style which would characterize Wycliffe's first translation (EV). John of Thoresby translated the catechism into Middle English, which likely helped inspire Wycliffe's project.

At the time of Wycliffe's translation, most people mainly heard scripture readings and ad hoc oral translations at church: the general level of literacy was low (though literacy rates—for reading rather than writing—was rapidly increasing among male townsfolk, to as high as 50% by 1500), and Bibles were costly (before the printing press). It is certain though that the Bible itself was familiar even to laymen (Note: "Sixteen years ago I wrote a book that attempted to document and index the contents of all Middle English poetry and prose that consisted largely of biblical material. These contents are idiosyncratic and eclectic, but when taken as a whole nearly all of the Old and New Testaments exist in Middle English before the Wycliffites began their project in the 1380s." James H. Morey, The Wycliffites: Hosts or Guests, First Finders or Followers? in Solopova, Elizabeth (1 January 2017), The Wycliffite Bible: Origin, History and Interpretation, Brill, doi:10.1163/9789004328921_007, p85) in the fourteenth century and that the whole of the New Testament at least could be read in translations.

For most of the previous 300 years, England had been trilingual, with the aristocracy and secular courts using dialects of Old French; (Note: See Anglo-Norman, Law French, Parisian dialect (the Plantagenet royal court), Poitevin dialect (Eleanor of Aquitaine)) lawyers, intellectuals, doctors and religious conducting their male affairs in Latin, the older language of record; and with the general and rural population usually speaking dialects that were still transitioning from the four major dialects of Old English to the incoming Middle English, or Cornish; (Note: John Trevisa noted this transition and regionality: "Although, from the beginning, Englishmen had three manners of speaking, southern, northern and midlands speech in the middle of the country, ... Nevertheless, through intermingling and mixing, first with Danes and then with Normans, amongst many the country language has arisen, and some use strange stammering, chattering, snarling, and grating gnashing." Bammesberger, Alfred (1992). "Chapter 2: The Place of English in Germanic and Indo-European". In Hogg, Richard M. (ed.). The Cambridge History of the English Language. Vol. 1: The Beginnings to 1066. Cambridge University Press. pp. 26–66. ISBN 978-0-521-26474-7.) the linguistic upheaval from the Anglo-Norman injection being enough that the writer of the so-called General Prologue noted that now no-one could understand the old translations (i.e., the Old English.)

Recent medieval scholarship disputes a sharp divide (Note: "Practically speaking, medieval English people encountered and used all three languages regularly." Hall, Megan J. (May 2021). "Women's Education and Literacy in England, 1066–1540". History of Education Quarterly. 61 (2): 181–212. doi:10.1017/heq.2021.8. S2CID 233401379.) between a fully literate elite who understood Latin, and a completely illiterate, monolingual populace with no understanding of letters and latinities, (Note: Hall, op. cit., makes the distinction within "reading" that the ability to sound out Latin words and knowing and understanding memorized liturgical texts was common in the population, however the ability to understand the words and meaning of non-liturgical Latin texts was rarer.) a common assertion in previous years. For example, the godparent system created a duty for laypeople to ensure that their godchildren had been taught and explained the Latin of the common prayers and meaning of the liturgy, independent of the clergy or schooling.

Latin manuscripts of scriptures were usually of selections of books: especially books of Psalms (Psalters, Book of Hours or breveries), or Gospel books: lay biblical material was designed for devotional and liturgical purposes, not theological disputation; similarly, few manuscripts of the Wycliffian translations are complete bibles. A complete vernacular Bible did exist in Anglo-Norman French, but it was likely rare, as only three manuscripts survive. As well, several Gospel harmonies were popular: for example, the so-called Magdalene Gospel is a summary and paraphrase of the four Gospel with a large number of direct quotes.

An analysis of London wills from before Wycliffe's time suggests that only 1% of the laity owned and bequeathed a single book, and only five laypeople in England are known to have owned a complete Vulgate Bible between 1348 and 1368. Even after the Wycliffian translations, the illiterate and poor still usually lacked the access to the Scripture: the full translation originally may have cost four marks and forty pence. (Note: I.e., two pounds, sixteen shillings and eightpence. The UK National Archives online calculator estimates this as at around £1,736 in 2017 terms, or 4 cows or 141 days of wages of a skilled tradesman. "Currency converter: 1270–2017". Another calculator estimates £2,300 in 2023 terms, and perhaps ten times as much. "Purchasing Power Calculator".) As with the Vulgate Latin scriptures, most Middle English Bible manuscripts contain selected books of the bible only, and decoration varied.

=== Non-Wycliffite Bibles ===
Historian James Morey, looking at "all Middle English poetry and prose that consisted largely of biblical material" wrote that "when taken as a whole nearly all of the Old and New Testaments exist in Middle English before the Wycliffites began their project in the 1380s," though "these contents are idiosyncratic and eclectic." For Morey, "the Wycliffites are 'first' in their coordinated efforts to produce a complete scholarly English Bible" and their project was characterized by "care, prestige, and organization" but did not operate in a vernacular vacuum.

==== Paues' Middle English New Testament ====
In 1902 and 1904, Anna Paues published manuscripts of an unknown third translation of the New Testament (missing most of the Gospels) in Northern and Southern Middle English, extant in multiple manuscripts, including two sets of translations of the Catholic epistles. The dialect and orthography of the earliest manuscript indicates a date in the late 1300s, with language features of North East Herefordshire, However historian Andrew Kraebel has found that the manuscript text is based on three different prior sources, no longer individually extant, from different locations and independent of the Wycliffite efforts; parts may pre-date the Wycliff Early Version.

==== Powell's Gospels and Epistles ====
Margaret Joyce Powell (1916) edited the non-Wycliffite Middle English commentary and translation of the Gospels of Mark and Luke, and the Pauline epistles, in Northern Midland Middle English dating them to the late 1300s. According to scholar of English Andrew Kraebel, "Nothing about these works indicates that they are Lollard productions."

==== Middle English Glossed Matthew ====
Also with Northern features, this is Middle English glosses of the Vugate Matthew.

==== Primer Psalms ====
Primers were English vernacular prayer books (or Book of Hours) to assist lay or clergy preparation for the Use of Sarum Latin Mass. About half of these have Psalms derive from the LV, but the other half have Psalms with translations from some other source(s), now lost, but perhaps owing something to the EV.

==== Authorship ====
In the 15th century, the translations were believed to have been made under the direction or instigation of English theologian John Wycliffe of the University of Oxford: Catholic source said Wycliffe "devised a plan of translation of the Holy Scriptures into the mother tongue". Wycliffe is said to have supported vernacular translations, purportedly saying "it helpeth Christian men to study the Gospel in that tongue in which they know best Christ's sentence". However, it has since become generally accepted by scholars that Wycliffe showed little interest in vernacular use until the end of his life and that quotations attributed to him strongly advocating such a position are from English writings no longer accepted as his authentic work.

From the 16th century, it was generally believed that Wycliffe himself made the translation. Starting in the 19th century, scholars generally believed them to be the work of several hands, all of whom were also priests, with Wycliffe having an increasingly small role. Nicholas of Hereford is said to have translated a part of the text, although this once certain attribution has come into question in recent times; John Purvey and perhaps John Trevisa are names that have been mentioned as possible authors. However, historian Anne Hudson has disputed the degree of evidence for Hereford, Purvey, or Trevisa having any involvement.

The association between the Wycliffian Bibles (sometimes with a radical-in-parts prologue) and Lollardy, a sometimes-violent pre-Reformation movement that rejected many of the distinctive teachings of the Catholic Church, caused the Kingdom of England and the established Catholic Church in England to undertake a drastic campaign to suppress it, although the reality or legal basis of this suppression of the Middle English Bible translations has been disputed.

=== John Wycliffe ===
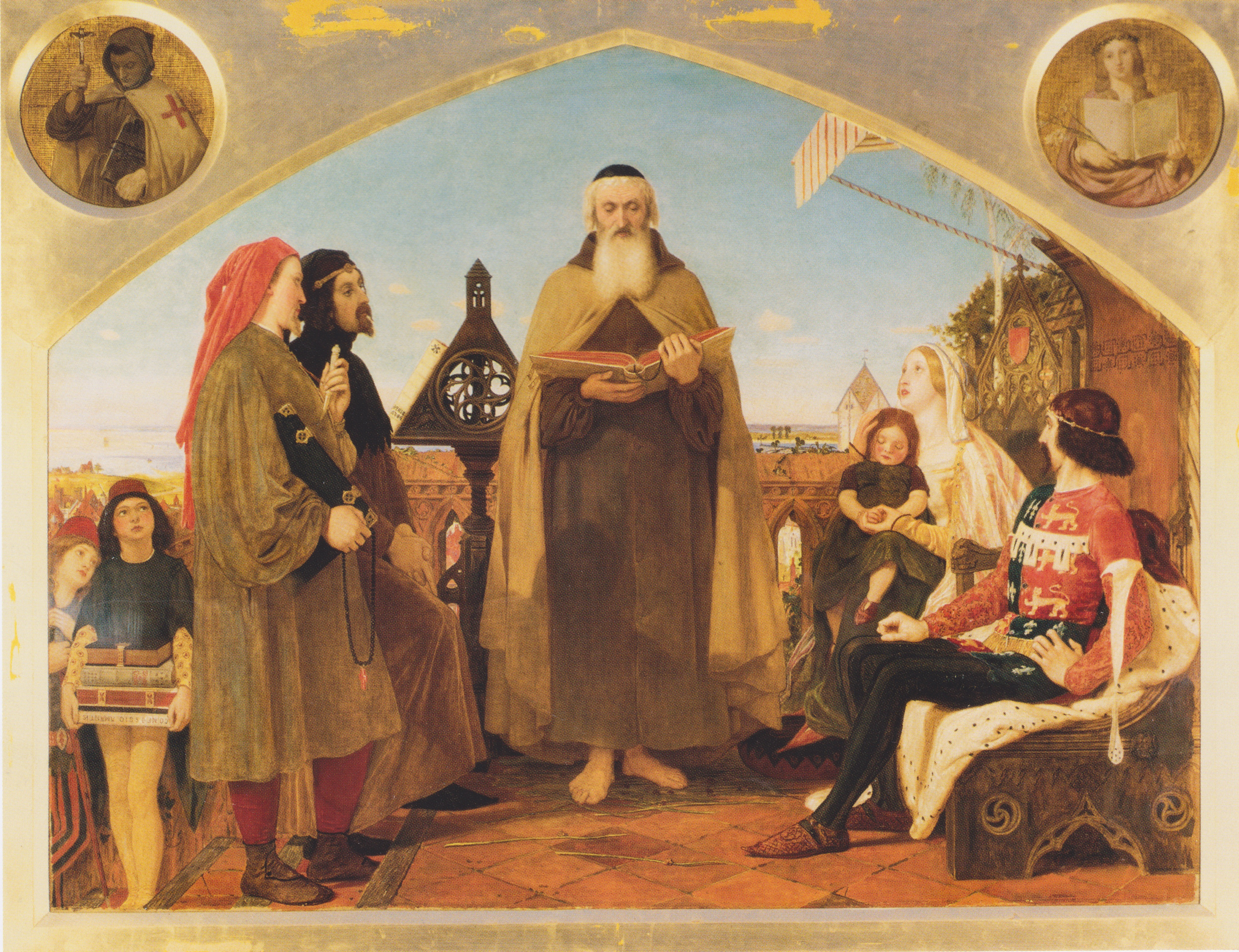
John Wycliffe reading his translation of the Bible to John of Gaunt. John's wife and child are also depicted, along with poets Geoffrey Chaucer and John Gower. c. 1859

John Wycliffe was ordained as a priest in 1351. Between 1372 and 1374 he composed a postil (a Biblical summary and commentary). This was unusual, as postils were typically written by friars, not priests.

Wycliffe advocated a doctrine known as "Dominion by Grace", under which everyone has a direct responsibility to God and his law. Priests and bishops who did not live in evangelical poverty were committing a mortal sin; bishops, kings, priests and magistrates who were in mortal sin had no legitimate authority over Christians not in mortal sin.

In 1377, Wycliffe published De Civili Dominio, which harshly criticized the church's wealth and argued that the king should confiscate ecclesiastical property. Pope Gregory XI responded with a series of five bulls against Wycliffe, and Archbishop Simon Sudbury ordered Wycliffe to appear on trial for his beliefs in March 1378. Joan of Kent, the queen mother, intervened and prevented his arrest.

Wycliffe believed that scripture was the ultimate source of truth, superseding even Aristotle's system of logic, and associated the words of scripture with the divine Word of Christ (see John 1:1). He believed that preaching the gospel was vastly more important than performing sacraments.

He promoted an early version of Luther's priesthood of all believers, conceiving of "the church" as the collection of elect Christians rather than the ecclesiastical hierarchy overseen by the Pope, and argued that the Pope had no authority to excommunicate believers. Beginning in 1380, Wycliffe wrote a series of texts denying transubstantiation. He argued that Pope Innocent III's interpretation of the doctrine was not founded in scripture and contradicted the views of Jerome and Augustine, and therefore constituted apostasy. This rejection of papal authority further worsened Wycliffe's relationship with the church.

He believed that the requirements for salvation could be directly understood by everyone, provided they had access to the words of Scripture in a language they understood. On the subject of Bible translation he wrote "Christ and his apostles taught the people in that tongue that was best known to them. Why should men not do so now?" He believed every Christian should study the Bible.

=== Alternative attribution ===
In 1894, Irish Benedictine historian Dom Aidan Gasquet challenged the conventional attribution of the Middle English Bible to Wycliffe and his circle. He had reviewed the EV and LV from a Catholic doctrinal perspective and found no translation errors that could have made the scriptural parts heretical. 21st-century historians have further noted "there is no direct evidence to connect any of the 250 surviving manuscripts of the MEB to heterodox users."

The pamphlet Four and Twenty Books attached to a few of the manuscripts (and treated in later decades as a General Prologue (GP)) did have some unorthodox content, however that content did not seem to contain the specific errors that were later (1458) deemed heretical, suggesting that the GP had been added later and evolved.

Gasquet found no convincing material that connected the EV and the LV to Wycliffe and his circle; for example one manuscript does mention Purvey, but the oldest manuscript does not and the name's presence in a later manuscript could refer to Purvey's ownership. Wycliffe had never mentioned a translation effort, and his endorsements of the vernacular came towards the end of his life only.

More recent scholars have provided several alternative creation sequences, that would also fit the evidence: for example that there was a previous existing Catholic EV that was glossed at Oxford University by e.g. scholars influenced by Wycliffe's biblicism, and re-translated as the LV (and the Paues Middle English New Testament) though not as a mammoth project; one of those involved later added the GP, as the project was hijacked by Wycliffite/Lollard radicals. This would make more credible Thomas More's statement that he had seen older English translations in aristocratic libraries that were not Wycliffite (i.e., were the EV or LV without the GP.) Historian Henry Kelly has suggested the evidence for a direct involvement by Wycliffe even as instigator is so slight, that the weaker "Wycliffian bible" rather than "Wycliffite bible" should be the preferred term.

Historian Richard Marsden notes that the records of early Wycliffite sermons do not use the Wycliffite bible translations but made their own from the Vulgate, suggesting that Wycliffite preachers were not the consumers of the so-called Wycliffite Bibles.

=== Lollardy and censorship ===
Lollard Bibles, Wycliffean versions of the Bible where a Wycliffite/Lollard preface had been added to the otherwise orthodox translation, were condemned by the Catholic Church .

This pestilent and wretched John Wyclif, of cursed memory, that son of the old serpent [...] endeavoured by every means to attack the very faith and sacred doctrine of Holy Church, devising—to fill up the measure of his malice—the expedient of a new translation of the Scriptures into the mother tongue.

— Thomas Arundel, attrib. Letter to Antipope John XXIII, c. 1411 – c. 1414; also attributed to Church Chronicle, 1395

In 1381, Archbishop Simon Sudbury was killed in the Peasants' Revolt. The revolt was largely inspired by John Ball, who was sympathetic to Wycliffe, but likely not connected with him directly. Nonetheless, many in the church blamed Wycliffe and his Lollard followers for galvanizing the public against the church.

Sudbury was succeeded as Archbishop of Canterbury by William Courtenay, who had long opposed Wycliffe's teachings. Courtenay convened the Earthquake Synod, named because it was initially delayed by an earthquake that Wycliffe himself believed symbolised "the judgement of God". At this synod, Wycliffe's writings (Biblical and otherwise) were quoted and denounced as heresy.

As a result of the synod's findings, King Richard II banned Wycliffe's teachings. Wycliffe left Oxford in the summer of 1381, and his fellow scholars denounced his beliefs under threat of excommunication.

In early 1395, the Lollards presented the Twelve Conclusions to parliament and published the accompanying polemic Ecclesiae Regimen. The second translation was finished within the next two years and quoted the Regimen in its General Prologue.

Thomas Arundel succeeded Courtenay as Archbishop of Canterbury in 1397. Although Arundel had previously approved the Glossed Gospels in his role as Archbishop of York, he now began to oppose Middle English translations of the Bible. Historian Margaret Deanesly speculated this change of heart was a reaction against the Lollards for these 1395 writings.

Deansley noted the early "episcopal policy to try to win over the scholarly Lollards by argument and benignancy" which won over Nicholas Hereford. John Purvey himself recanted his heresies in February 1401.

The association between Wycliffite Bibles and Lollardy caused the Kingdom of England and the established Catholic Church in England to undertake a drastic campaign to suppress Lollard bibles. In the early years of the 15th century, Henry IV (in his 1401 statute De haeretico comburendo), Archbishop Thomas Arundel, and Henry Knighton published criticism and enacted some of the severest religious censorship laws in Europe at that time. Even twenty years after Wycliffe's death, at the Oxford Convocation of 1407, it was solemnly voted that no new translation of the Bible should be made without prior approval.

Between 1407 and 1409, Bishop Arundel's Constitution Periculosa (sometimes called the "Constitutions of Oxford") took effect. These prohibited new literal translations of any scripture, including individual texts, without authorization from the bishop on penalty of excommunication, including possessing or reading them in public. The Constitutions also specifically forbade the public reading (i.e., aloud, in schools, halls, hospices, etc.) of "any tract of John Wycliffe, or any other tract made in his time" that was not explicitly approved by the university. The ban did not apply to translations as poetry (particularly the Psalms) or paraphrase: such as the Middle English Metrical Paraphrase of the Old Testament.

Although he did not authorize any fresh translations of the Bible itself—it is not known whether Arundel was ever presented with any applications to make new translations—Arundel did authorize a Middle English translation of Meditations on the Life of Christ in 1410: Nicholas Love's The Mirror of the Blessed Life of Jesus Christ, an expansive paraphrase of the harmonized Gospels. This translation, which became "the orthodox reading-book of the devout laity," included newly written passages that explicitly denounced Lollard beliefs.

The base text translated in the Wycliffean and non-Wyciffean Bibles was the Latin Vulgate. Plain English scripture manuscripts without illegal Wycliffite/Lollard prefaces or glosses (Note: "Changes to the layout, such as the removal of Wycliffite paratextual material (the Great Prologue and marginal glosses particularly), the addition of the Old Testament readings from the Mass to New Testament manuscripts, and a table of contents facilitating the retrieval of the liturgical readings made the copies also acceptable to an orthodox—both clerical and lay—readership." François, Wim (2018). "Vernacular Bible Reading in Late Medieval and Early Modern Europe: The "Catholic" Position Revisited". The Catholic Historical Review. 104 (1): 23–56. doi:10.1353/cat.2018.0001. S2CID 163790511.) (especially if explicitly marked as dating before 1409) could not be distinguished as Wycliffite texts, and were, on the face of it, legal. These circulated freely and were widely used by clergy and laity. Historian Peter Marshall commented "It seems implausible that so many manuscripts of the Wycliffite bible could have survived…if bishops had really been determined to suppress it in all circumstances."

Catholic commentators of the 15th and 16th centuries such as Thomas More believed these manuscript Middle English English Bibles to represented an anonymous earlier orthodox translation: subsequent scholars relied on a lack of evidence for such a tradition, until the re-discovery of various non-Wycliffean scripture manuscripts in the 20th century, such as the Paues manuscripts and Holkam Hall misc. 40, which pairs non-Wycliffite translations of the Epistles and Acts with the Wycliffite EV Gospels.

The Suppression of Heresy Act 1414 specifically ordered that possession of heretical material must be treated as information in any investigation not as evidence of heresy per se. (Note: Further, "But Lollards were not prosecuted for being lower middle class; nor for the mere fact of possessing English books. What mattered was how they chose to interpret them. For those already believed to hold heretical opinions, the ownership of vernacular scriptures might indeed clinch the case against them." Marshall, Peter (2018). Heretics and believers: a history of the English Reformation (First published in paperback ed.). New Haven London: Yale University Press. ISBN 978-0-300-23458-9.)

Manuscripts of Middle English vernacular scriptures had thus been effectively suppressed though not, for private use without Wycliffite paratexts by orthodox readers, actually prohibited, though this was primarily enforced against heretical members of the lower classes, not the aristocracy. According to historian Henry Ansgar Kelly, it was not until 1458, following the odd case of Richard Hunne that systematic efforts at prohibition took effect, however even partisan Elizabethan historian John Foxe noted the dubious legal basis of what became assumed, for centuries, was a blanket ban.

This strict enforcement of religious orthodoxy may have constrained the development of Middle English literature and religious thought over the next century. David Daniell suggests that "had he written after 1409, his anti-clericalism would have led Chaucer himself to be investigated as a heretic" and David Lawton claims that the Constitutions made it unsafe to write works like Piers Plowman. Bishop Reginald Pecock attempted to rebut Lollardy on Wycliffe's own terms, writing in the vernacular and relying on scripture and reason instead of church authority. Stephen Lahey argues that these responses "may be the first genuine philosophical literature in the English language." Despite arguing in favor of the Catholic church, Pecock's approach led to his own charges of heresy.

== Influence ==
=== Influence on subsequent English Bibles ===
While the Middle English Bible translations were based on the Latin Vulgate, the Reformation era translations by William Tyndale (Tyndale Bible) and Miles Coverdale (Great Bible) also used the original Greek and Hebrew. Tyndale does not credit Wycliffe as a source, but he was almost certainly familiar with Wycliffian Bibles, and his translation sometimes seems to overlap with them. He may have been influenced by hearing the Wycliffian versions read aloud, but the degree of influence is unclear and actively debated.

Despite being written more than a century later, Tyndale's translation came to overshadow Wycliffe's. According to the Cambridge History of the Bible, "The Bible which permeated the minds of later generations shows no direct descent from the Wycliffite versions... Tyndale's return to the original languages meant that translations based on the intermediate Latin of the Vulgate would soon be out of date." Consequently, it was generally ignored in later English Protestant biblical scholarship. Herbert Brook Workman argues that "In later years the existence of Wyclif's version seems to have been forgotten", pointing out that John Wesley incorrectly identified Tyndale's Bible as the first English translation.

However, surviving manuscripts of Wycliffian Bibles without Lollard/Wycliffite additions were commonly accepted as works of an unknown Catholic translator; so these manuscripts continued to circulate among 16th-century English Catholics, and many of its renderings of the Vulgate into English were or became established idiom and were adopted by the translators of the Rheims New Testament, one of the bases of the King James Version.

=== Wycliffe's Bible in print ===
The earliest printed edition, of the New Testament only, was by John Lewis in 1731.

In 1850, Forshall and Madden published a four-volume critical edition of the Wycliffian Bibles containing the text of the earlier and later versions in parallel columns. Forshall and Madden's edition retains the letter yogh (ʒ) but replaces thorn (þ) with the digraph th.

Between 1959 and 1969, Wycliffe scholar Conrad Lindberg published a critically edited single-manuscript version of the EV, from Genesis to Baruch 3:20, based on MS. Bodl. 959 at the Bodleian Library, Oxford, in five volumes; he then completed the rest of the EV Old Testament by critically editing MS. Christ Church 145 from Christ Church, Oxford, publishing it in 1973 as the sixth volume. This was followed by the EV Gospels and the rest of the New Testament, also based on MS. Christ Church 145, published in 1994 and 1997, respectively, as the seventh and eighth volumes. Finally, between 1999 and 2004, Lindberg published a four-volume critically edited version of the "later LV" (or LLV), based on MS. Bodl. 277 and termed "King Henry's Bible" after an inscription within the manuscript stating that King Henry VI had donated it to the Carthusians at the London Charterhouse.

=== In popular culture ===
- Jorge Luis Borges mentions Wycliffite Bibles in his short story "The Book of Sand", where he calls it the "Black-letter Wyclif", in reference to the Blackletter script used to write the publication.

== See also ==
- List of most expensive books and manuscripts
- English Hexapla

== Sources ==
- Daniell, David (2003), The Bible in English, Yale, ISBN 0-300-09930-4.
- Deanesly, Margaret (1920). The Lollard Bible and Other Medieval Bible Versions. Cambridge University Press.
- Hargreaves, Henry (1969). "The Wycliffite Versions". In Lampe, G. (ed.). The Cambridge History of the Bible, Volume 2. Cambridge University Press.
- Justice, Steven (1999). "Lollardy". In Wallace, David (ed.). The Cambridge History of Medieval English Literature. Cambridge University Press.
- Lahey, Stephen (2009). John Wyclif. New York: Oxford University Press. ISBN 978-0-19-518331-3.
- Lawton, David (1999). "Englishing the Bible". In Wallace, David (ed.). The Cambridge History of Medieval English Literature. Cambridge University Press.
