= Wheathill =

Wheathill may refer to:

== Name ==
- Anne Wheathill (fl. 1584), English poet and prayer writer

== Places ==
- Wheathill, Shropshire, a village and civil parish in Shropshire, England
- Wheathill, Somerset, a hamlet in the parish of Lovington, Somerset, England
- Wheathill, County Fermanagh, a place in County Fermanagh, Northern Ireland

== See also ==
- Wheat Hill, a mountain in the Catskill Mountains of New York
- Wheatville (disambiguation)
