= The Gates of Hell (Livingston novel) =

2016 novel by Michael Livingston

- First edition cover
- Author: Michael Livingston
- Language: English
- Genre: Historical fiction Fantasy
- Published: November 15, 2016
- Publisher: Tor Books
- Publication place: United States
- Media type: Print (hardcover); Audiobook; E-book
- Pages: 400
- ISBN: 978-0-76538-033-3
- Preceded by: The Shards of Heaven
- Followed by: The Realms of God

The Gates of Hell is a 2016 historical fantasy novel by Michael Livingston. The sequel to The Shards of Heaven, it explores the aftermath of the fall of Alexandria to Octavian, and the continued struggles of Juba and Cleopatra Selene.

== Plot ==
Alexandria has fallen to Octavian, now known as Augustus, and both Mark Antony and Cleopatra are dead. A conquered Cleopatra Selene and her husband Juba are compelled to serve Augustus while secretly seeking their vengeance against the Roman Empire using the powerful artifacts known as the Shards of Heaven. While Caesarion has spirited the Ark of the Covenant out of Alexandria for its protection, and Octavian possesses the Trident of Poseidon that only Juba can control, Juba has also acquired the Aegis of Zeus from the Alexandrian tomb of Alexander the Great, and Selene steals the Palladium of Troy from the Temple of the Vestals in Rome. Octavian and Juba are soon alerted to the existence of a fifth Shard, the Lance of Olyndicus, wielded by the Cantabrian bandit Corocotta.

== Characters ==
- Juba, son and heir to the king of Numidia, adopted by Julius Caesar after his conquest of Numidia
- Cleopatra Selene, daughter of Cleopatra and Mark Antony and now Juba's wife
- Augustus, Caesar's adopted son and heir
- Caesarion, son of Caesar and Cleopatra
- Hannah, Caesarion's Jewish wife
- Lucius Vorenus, a Roman centurion loyal to Caesarion

== Writing and publication ==
Livingston, a historian and professor of medieval literature, said in 2015 about his choice of setting:

As a series, the Shards of Heaven trilogy is about resolving a hidden "truth" behind the mythologies of our world, and the threads that I needed for this all come together in a fierce knot during the first century before the Common Era. So that's where the story needed to be. That fact aside, however, I know of few moments of higher historical drama, with more fascinating characters of rich complexity, than the end of the Roman Republic and the rise of the Roman Empire. Mark Antony, Cleopatra, Augustus Caesar, Caesarion, Juba II, Cleopatra Selene ... any one of these alone would be enough to fascinate a lifetime. Placed on a single stage, they are an incredible cast for a writer.

Noting that the trilogy "is intended to fall in the gray area between legend and history", Livingston said that while researching it he read "a great many articles and studies that might bring most folk to tears: from scholarly arguments about the construction of Roman triremes to countless ancient descriptions of places like the Great Lighthouse or the Tomb of Alexander the Great."

In a November 2015 interview, Livingston noted that the sequel to The Shards of Heaven would be called The Temples of the Ark. As of January 2016, the author's web site referred to the second installment as The Gates of Hell.

Livingston previewed the cover of The Gates of Hell on his website in March 2016. He said that the image, created by Larry Ronstant, has the same "feel" as the cover of The Shards of Heaven and features a dark-skinned Juba wearing a bloody toga praetexta.
