= John Douglas (lithotomist) =

John Douglas (died 25 June 1743) was a lithotomist.

He was born one of the seven sons of William Douglas (d. 1705) of Baads, Edinburgh and his wife, Joan, daughter of James Mason of Park, Blantyre, and brother of Dr James Douglas, physician to the Queen.

He was for some time surgeon to the Westminster Infirmary. He was elected a Fellow of the Royal Society in 1720.

== Writings ==
He was the author of several medical controversial treatises, criticising the works of Chamberlain, Chapman, and Cheselden, most of which are now forgotten.

His book on lithotomy was translated into French in 1724.
