= Glossed Gospels =

Start of John in the manuscript Вodley 143

The Glossed Gospels are a set of late 14th-century Middle English commentaries on the gospels of Matthew, Mark, Luke and John. They are compilations of translated material and not original works. They circulated independently, with most manuscripts containing the text of one or two gospels plus the long commentary. The named "Glossed Gospels" is conventional; they are not simply gospels with glosses (annotations).

The English gospel translation used is an early version of the Wycliffite translation. There was a standard page layout. Two or three verses are presented in large text followed by an equally long or much longer commentary in smaller text. This layout may have been inspired by Peter Lombard's commentary on the Psalter. Citations are embedded in the text and not put in the margins, a system that follows Thomas Aquinas' Catena aurea, which was a major source for the Glossed Gospels. Citations are by auther and work.

The Glossed Gospels have been attributed to John Wycliffe and to John Purvey. At the start of the commentaries on Matthew and Luke, the compiler refers to himself as the "pore caitif" (poor wretch) and has also been identified with the anonymous author of a catechetical tract known as the Pore Caitif. Glossed Matthew does not draw on the Catena aurea, which suggests that it may have been created separately from the rest.

== List of manuscripts ==
There are at least nine manuscripts:

- Cambridge University Library, MS Кk. 2.9
- Fitzwilliam Museum, МсClean Bequest, MS 133
- Dublin, Trinity College, MS В.1.38
- London, Вritish Library, Additional MS 28026
- London, Вritish Library, Аdditional MS 41175
- Оxford, Вodleian Library, MS Вodley 143
- Оxford, Вodleian Library, MS Вodley 243
- Оxford, Вodleian Library, MS Laud Misc 235
- York Мinster, MS XV1 D. 2

The York manuscript is unique in being a dominical gospel, that is, in limiting itself to those parts of the gospel read in the liturgy for Sundays.

== Bibliography ==
- Brady, Mary Teresa (1954). "The Pore Caitif: An Introductory Study". Traditio. 10: 529–548.
- Deanesly, Margaret (1920). The Lollard Bible and Other Medieval Bible Versions. Cambridge University Press.
- Hargreaves, Henry (1961). "The Marginal Glosses to the Wycliffite New Testament". Studia neophilologica. 33 (2): 285–300.
- Hargreaves, Henry (1979). "Popularising Biblical Scholarship: The Role of the Wycliffite Glossed Gospels". In W. Lourdaux; D. Verhelst (eds.). The Bible and Medieval Culture (PDF). Leuven University Press. pp. 171–189.
- Hargreaves, Henry (1993). "The Wycliffite Glossed Gospels as Source: Further Evidence?". Traditio. 48: 247–251.
- Kraebel, Andrew B. (2014). "Middle English Gospel Glosses and the Translation of Exegetical Authority". Traditio. 69: 87–123.
- Lavinsky, David. (2020). "William Thorpe's Other Books:" Second Generation" Wycliffism and the Glossed Gospels". Mediaevalia. 41 (41): 189–215.
- Somerset, Fiona. (2019). "'No Man May Serue to Two Lordis': The Lollard Glossed Gospels as Spiritual Advice in John Colop's Common–Profit Book, CUL Ff. 6.31". Journal of the Early Book Society for the Study of Manuscripts and Printing History. 22: 73–365.
