= The Shards of Heaven =

2015 historical fantasy novel by Michael Livingston

- First edition cover
- Author: Michael Livingston
- Audio read by: Paul Hodgson
- Cover artist: Larry Rostant
- Language: English
- Genre: Historical fiction Fantasy
- Published: November 24, 2015
- Publisher: Tor Books
- Publication place: United States
- Media type: Print (hardcover/paperback); Audiobook; E-book
- Pages: 416
- ISBN: 978-0-76538-031-9
- Followed by: The Gates of Hell

The Shards of Heaven is a 2015 historical fantasy debut novel by Michael Livingston. It chronicles Octavian's war against Mark Antony and Cleopatra, seen from the perspective of the minor historical figures who surround them.

== Plot ==
Years after the murder of Julius Caesar, his adopted son Octavian has succeeded him as a powerful force in Rome, if only as a senator with a large personal army. Octavian is somewhat threatened by the existence of Caesarion, Caesar's son by the Egyptian queen Cleopatra, who is himself Pharaoh alongside his mother. Octavian's nemesis Mark Antony has left Italy for Egypt, where he has fathered three children with Cleopatra, and his declaration of Caesarion as Caesar's legitimate heir incites war with Rome. Meanwhile, Caesar's other adopted son, Juba, has found the fabled Trident of Poseidon, a magical artifact with unearthly destructive power. He intends to use it—and the other so-called "Shards of Heaven"—to avenge himself on Rome for the death of his natural father, the king of Numidia.

== Characters ==
- Juba, son and heir to the king of Numidia, adopted by Julius Caesar after his conquest of Numidia
- Octavian, Caesar's adopted son and heir
- Cleopatra, Queen of Egypt
- Mark Antony, former Roman general and Triumvir
- Caesarion, son of Caesar and Cleopatra
- Cleopatra Selene, daughter of Cleopatra and Antony, twin to Helios
- Alexander Helios, son of Cleopatra and Antony, twin to Selene
- Ptolemy Philadelphus, son of Cleopatra and Antony
- Lucius Vorenus and Titus Pullo, Roman centurions formerly loyal to Julius Caesar, now in the service of Antony
- Didymus Chalcenterus, chief librarian of the Library of Alexandria and tutor to Cleopatra's children

== Writing and publication ==
Livingston, a historian and professor of medieval literature, had been writing fiction for years while publishing multiple academic works. He wrote The Shards of Heaven during the decade after the publication of his first short story in 2005. Asked about his choice of setting, Livingston said:

As a series, the Shards of Heaven trilogy is about resolving a hidden "truth" behind the mythologies of our world, and the threads that I needed for this all come together in a fierce knot during the first century before the Common Era. So that's where the story needed to be. That fact aside, however, I know of few moments of higher historical drama, with more fascinating characters of rich complexity, than the end of the Roman Republic and the rise of the Roman Empire. Mark Antony, Cleopatra, Augustus Caesar, Caesarion, Juba II, Cleopatra Selene ... any one of these alone would be enough to fascinate a lifetime. Placed on a single stage, they are an incredible cast for a writer.

Noting that "The Shards of Heaven is intended to fall in the gray area between legend and history", Livingston said that while researching the novel he read "a great many articles and studies that might bring most folk to tears: from scholarly arguments about the construction of Roman triremes to countless ancient descriptions of places like the Great Lighthouse or the Tomb of Alexander the Great."

Livingston previewed the cover of The Shards of Heaven on his website in March 2015. He said that the image, created by Larry Ronstant, was inspired by the covers of Bernard Cornwell historical novels such as 1356, and features "roughed up" Roman centurion armor as would have been worn by Vorenus and Pullo. The Shards of Heaven was published on November 24, 2015.

== Sequel ==
In a November 2015 interview, Livingston noted that the sequel to The Shards of Heaven would be called The Temples of the Ark. As of January 2016, the author's web site referred to the second installment as The Gates of Hell.

== Critical reception ==
Publishers Weekly said that "this multipronged tale is dense with action and incident; it’s grounded in history, mythology, and religion, but not weighed down by them." Kirkus Reviews wrote, "Readers with an interest in this era will be captivated by the weaving of fiction with the reality of the past and the weaving of the reality of the past with the magic of the unseen world, even if the religious inquiries of the text aren’t especially fresh." In a blurb featured on the novel's cover, historical novelist Bernard Cornwell called The Shards of Heaven "a brilliant debut", writing that "Livingston has spiced real history with a compelling dose of fantasy! Wonderfully imaginative and beautifully told."
