= Trident of Poseidon =

Weapon used by Poseidon/Neptune

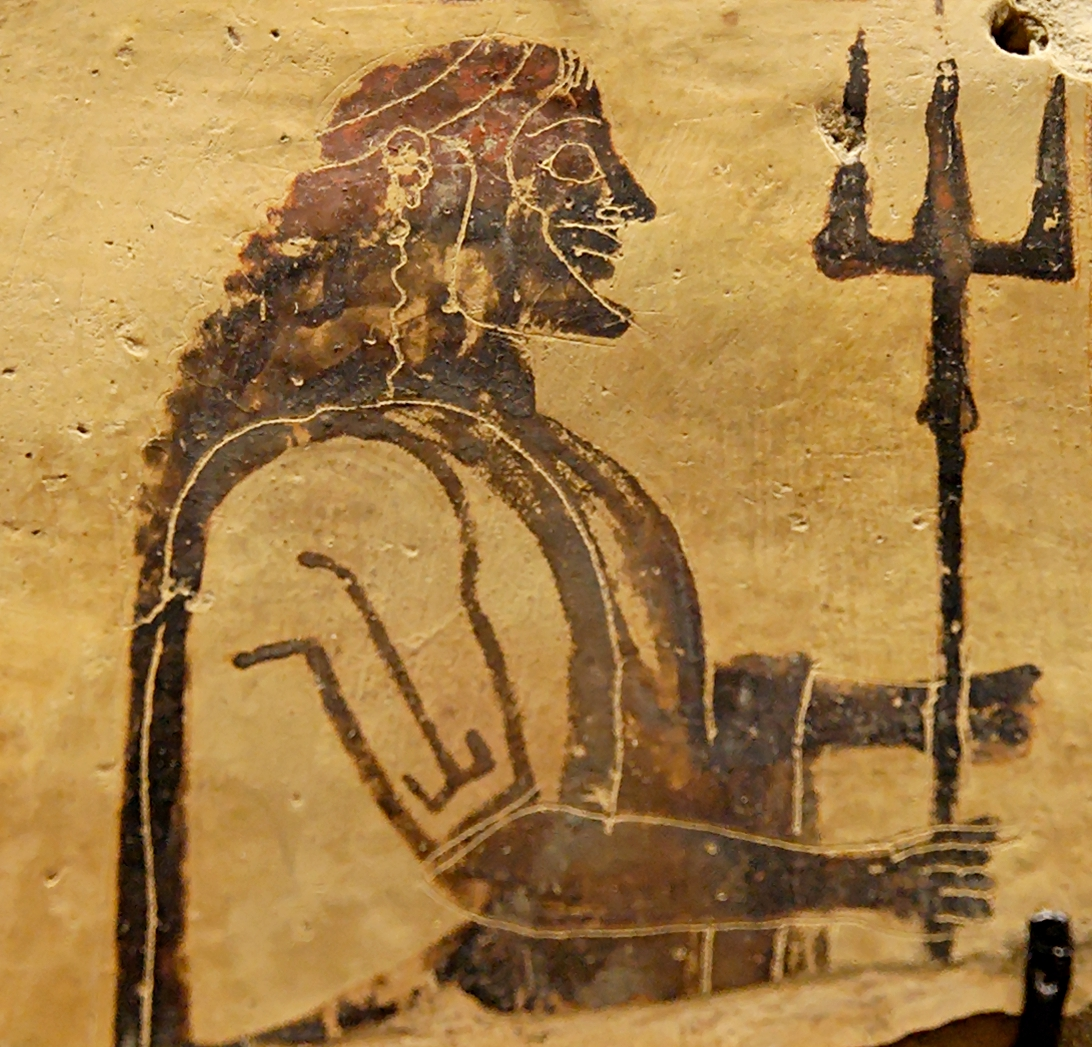
Poseidon with his trident, Corinthian plaque, 550–525 BC

The trident of Poseidon and his Roman equivalent, Neptune, has been their traditional divine attribute in many ancient depictions. Poseidon's trident was crafted by the Cyclopes.

== Myths ==
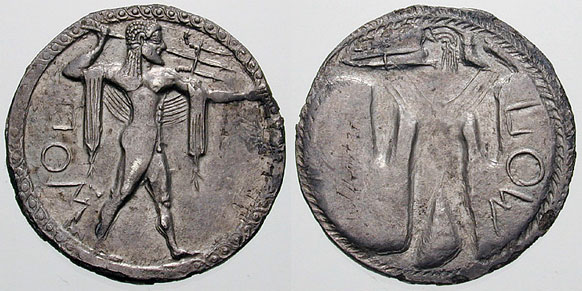
Coin of Poseidonia, c. 530–500 BC. Poseidon is seen wielding a trident with a chlamys draped over his arms.

In Greek mythology, Poseidon's trident was forged by the Cyclopes according to Pseudo-Apollodorus's Bibliotheke. (Note: The Cyclopes also provided Zeus his thunderbolt according to this passage in Bibliotheke.)

Poseidon wields his trident on a number of occasions. He used his trident to strike a rock upon the hill of the Acropolis, producing a well of seawater, in what developed into a contest between him and Athena over possession of Attica. When he lost, Poseidon used the trident to dry out the land so they had no water. The well was later to be called the Erechtheis. There is further myth that Poseidon (Neptune) produced a horse by striking the earth with the trident, in order to bolster his claim, but there is no attestation for this among Greek writers. The alleged trident print on a rock and the sea well within the Erechtheion were witnessed by the geographer Pausanias while visiting Athens. (Note: Pausanias wrote that the sea well gave forth the sound of waves when the south wind blew.)

In another myth, Poseidon creates a spring or springs with the strike of his trident to reward Amymone for her encounter with him. In a version of another myth Poseidon wields his trident to scare off a satyr who tries to rape Amymone after she mistakenly hits him with a hunting spear.

There is also a myth where Poseidon touches the island of Delos with his trident, affixing it firmly to the sea floor. Another myth tells how Poseidon, enraged by sacrilegious behavior of Ajax the Lesser, uses the trident to split the rock to which Ajax was clinging.

The oldest coins of Poseidonia from the 6th century BC depict a trident wielded by Poseidon in his right hand, similar to Zeus's thunderbolt. An Attic red figure kylix from c. 475 BC depicts Poseidon killing the Giant Polybotes with his trident.

== Symbolism ==
According to the second and third Vatican Mythographer, Neptune's trident symbolizes the three properties of water: liquidity, fecundity and drinkability.

The trident of Neptune was viewed by Roman scholar Maurus Servius Honoratus as three-pronged because "the sea is said to be a third part of the world, or because there are three kinds of water: seas, streams and rivers".

== Modern scholarship ==
The view shared by Friedrich Wieseler, E. M. W. Tillyard and several other researchers is that Poseidon's trident is a fish spear, typical for coast-dwelling Greeks.

According to Robert Graves, however, both Poseidon's trident and Zeus's thunderbolt were originally a sacred labrys, but later distinguished from each other when Poseidon became god of the sea, while Zeus claimed the right to the thunderbolt.

According to a competing proposal by H. B. Walters, Poseidon's trident is derived from Zeus's lotus scepter, with Poseidon being Zeus in his marine aspect.

== Modern references ==
The flag of Barbados

In present times, Poseidon's trident is a recurring symbol. It appears on the coat of arms of Liverpool City Council, on the seal of the Greek Navy, and on the crest of the Delta Delta Delta sorority. It is a recurring motif in the US military, being featured on the crest of the United States Navy SEALs and on the badge of USS John S. McCain. A series of American fleet ballistic missiles Trident is named after Neptune's trident, as well as Operation Neptune Spear.

The personification of Great Britain, Britannia is depicted with the trident of Poseidon as a symbol of naval power. The broken tip of the trident appears on the flag of Barbados. In this instance, the reference is to its use as Britannia's trident, broken to symbolise the end of Britain's colonial rule.

The logo of car manufacturer Maserati is based on the trident from the statue of Neptune in Bologna.

The trident also appears multiple times in popular culture:

- Poseidon's trident is owned by King Triton (Poseidon's son) in Disney's 1989 animated film The Little Mermaid and its sequels and spinoffs.
- Poseidon's Trident is a magical artifact with destructive powers in Michael Livingston's 2015 historical fantasy novel The Shards of Heaven.
- Disney's Pirates of the Caribbean franchise also featured tridents. The Trident of Poseidon first appears in the Jack Sparrow prequel book series by Rob Kidd, and later in the fifth film Pirates of the Caribbean: Dead Men Tell No Tales, as a powerful artifact that bestows upon its possessor total control over the seas. In the film, it is sought after by Jack Sparrow, Hector Barbossa, Armando Salazar, and Henry Turner, with Henry using the artifact to break every curse and free Will Turner from the Flying Dutchman. The Sea of Thieves crossover "A Pirate's Life" featured the Trident of Dark Tides.

== See also ==
- Trishula
- Tryzub
