= Wheatville =

Wheatville may refer to the following places in the United States:

- The former name of Kingsburg, California
- Wheatville, New York, a place in New York
- Wheatville, Austin, a former neighborhood in Austin, Texas

== See also ==
- Wheathill (disambiguation)
