= James Douglas (physician) =

Scottish physician and anatomist

James Douglas FRS (21 March 1675 – 2 April 1742) was a Scottish physician and anatomist, and Physician Extraordinary to Queen Caroline.

== Life and works ==
One of the seven sons of William Douglas (died 1705) and his wife, Joan, daughter of James Mason of Park, Blantyre, he was born in West Calder, West Lothian, in 1675. His brother was the lithotomist John Douglas (died 1759).

In 1694 he graduated MA from the University of Edinburgh and then took his medical doctorate at Reims before going to London in 1700.

He worked as an obstetrician, and gaining a great reputation as a physician, was elected Fellow of the Royal Society of London in 1706, FCP in 1721.

One of the most respected anatomists in the country, Douglas was also a well-known man-midwife. He was asked to investigate the case of Mary Toft, an English woman from Godalming, Surrey, who in 1726 became the subject of considerable controversy when she tricked doctors into believing that she had given birth to rabbits. Despite his early scepticism (Douglas thought that a woman giving birth to rabbits was as likely as a rabbit giving birth to a human child), Douglas went to see Toft, and subsequently exposed her as a fraud.

Douglas practiced midwifery and performed public dissections at home.

Douglas mentored and befriended anatomist and surgeon William Hunter (1718–1783), whom he met in 1740 when Hunter came to London. Hunter would live in the Douglas household and remained there after Douglas died in London on 2 April 1742, leaving a widow and two children.

Douglas produced a series of manuscript English, French, Latin and Greek grammars, and an ample index to the works of Horace. A Treatise on English Pronunciation by James Douglas (1914) was edited by Anna Paues. Another edition was due to Börje Holmberg (Lund, 1956). He undertook botanical studies, notably his monograph on the Guernsey Lily.

== Terminology ==
As a result of Douglas's investigations of female pelvic anatomy, several anatomical terms bear his name:

- Pouch of Douglas

Peritoneal space formed by deflection of the peritoneum.

- Douglasitis

Inflammation of Douglas pouch.

- Douglas abscess

Suppuration in Douglas pouch, most often seen in appendicitis or adnexitis.

- Douglas fold

A fold of peritoneum forming the lateral boundary of Douglas pouch.

- Douglas line

The arcuate line of the sheath of the rectus abdominis muscle.

- Douglas septum

The septum formed by the union of Rathke's folds, forming the rectum of the fetus.
