= James H. Morey =

American academic

James H. Morey is an American academic. He is a professor of English at Emory University teaching courses in Old and Middle English, including Chaucer.

Morey is a graduate of Hamilton College (A.B. 1983). He holds a Master's (1987) and a Ph.D. (1990) from Cornell University and received a Fulbright Scholarship to Iceland (1987–88).

Morey's Book and Verse is regarded as the standard work on English Biblical paraphrases. In it, Morey argues that Biblical material was widely available in English from the 12th-century on, and that the Church's opposition was not to translation per se but to the Lollard encouragement of lay interpretation of the Bible.

== Books ==
- Editor, Jerome's Abbreviated Psalter: The Middle English and Latin Versions, 2019, Amsterdam University Press
- Book and Verse: A Guide to Middle English Biblical Literature, 2000, University of Illinois Press
- Prik of Conscience, 2012, Kalamazoo: Medieval Institute Publications

== Publications ==
- "The Wycliffites: Hosts or Guests, First Finders or Followers?" in The Wycliffite Bible: Origin, History and Interpretation, ed. Elizabeth Solopova (Brill, 2016): 85–104.
- "Middle English Didactic Literature," in Readings in Medieval Texts, ed. David F. Johnson and Elaine M. Treharne (Oxford: Oxford Univ. Press, 2005): 183–97.
- "Plows, Laws, and Sanctuary in Medieval England and in the Wakefield Mactacio Abel," Studies in Philology 95 (1998): 41–55.
- "The 'cultour' in the Miller's Tale: Alison as Iseult," Chaucer Review 29 (1995): 373–81.
- "Latimer's 'Sermon on the Plough' and Spenser's Muiopotmos," Notes & Queries ns 42 (1995): 286–88.
- Peter Comestor, Biblical Paraphrase, and the Medieval Popular Bible," Speculum, vol. 68, no. 1, Jan. 1993, pp. 6–35.
