= Richard Maidstone =

English Carmelite friar, theologian and poet (died 1396)

Richard Maidstone or Maydestone (died 1396) was an English Carmelite friar, theologian, and poet.

== Life ==
Richard Maidstone, a native of Kent, was educated at Oxford, where he became bachelor and doctor of divinity. Maidstone was confessor to John of Gaunt, and a Carmelite friar of Aylesford, Kent, where he died on 1 June 1396. According to the Savile Catalogue, compiled in 1586, he was a fellow of Merton College, but, as Anthony à Wood noticed, this is extremely doubtful. He speaks of himself in his Psalms as

frere Richarde Maydenstoone
In Mary ordre of the Carme,
That bachilor is in dyvynité.

He appears to have taken part in the controversy about evangelical poverty, and was prominent among the opponents of the followers of Wiclif. John Ashwardby was his special antagonist.

== Works ==
Maidstone's extant works are:

1. The Seven Penitential Psalms in English; in Rawlinson MS. A. 389, ff. 13–20, of the early fifteenth century, and in Digby MSS. 18, ff. 38–63, and 102, ff. 128–35, all in the Bodleian Library; incipit "To godes worshipe that us dere bouȝte".
2. Protectorium Pauperis, incipit "Constituit eum super ecclesiam"; in MS. e Mus. 86, ff. 160–76, in the Bodleian Library.
3. Determinationes; in MS. e Mus. 94 in the Bodleian there are by Maidstone two Determinations, of which the first is acephalous, and the second, entitled Determinacio ejusdem doctoris contra magistrum Johannem [Ashwardby] vicarium ecclesie sancte Marie Oxon, begins "Utrum Christus enumerans in Euangelio pauperes". Bernard refers to this manuscript as containing "Lectiones et quæstiones cum determinationibus".
4. Canon in anulum Johannis de Northamptone ejusdem ordinis; scilicet regulæ … ad inveniendum literam dominicalem, &c.; in Digby MS. 98, ff. 41–8, mutilated, and Bodley MS. 68, both in the Bodleian.
5. Super Concordia Regis Ricardi et civium Londiniensium, a long poem in elegiac verse on Richard II's visit to London on 29 August 1393, edited by Thomas Wright, with the Alliterative Poem on the Deposition of King Richard II, Camden Society, 1838, and in Political Songs, vol. 1. pp. 282–99, Rolls Series.

Other works are:

1. In Canticum Moysis.
2. In Cantica Canticorum.
3. Compendium Divi Augustini de Civitate Dei.
4. Precationes Metricæ.
5. Conciones xvi ad Clerum.
6. Sermones Oxonienses.
7. Sermones de Sanctis.
8. Sermones de Tempore.
9. Lecturæ Scholasticæ.
10. In Sententias.
11. De Sacerdotali Functione.
12. Quæstiones Ordinariæ.
13. Contra Lolhardos.
14. Contra Wiclefistas.

Of most of these the first words are given by Bale and De Villiers, but they do not seem to be extant, with the possible exception of the sermons. At the end of the fifteenth century a collection of Sermones Dominicales et de Sanctis, "Dormi secure" nuncupati, were frequently printed. These have been variously ascribed to Maidstone or John of Verdena. In the British Library (formerly in the British Library) there are fourteen editions, ranging between c. 1475 and 1530. Graesse gives the following enumeration:

1.	Without date or place (C. de Hornbosch about 1481), fol.
2.	Without date or place (Louvain, John de Westfalia, about 1483), fol.
3.	Strasburg, 1487–8, fol.
4, 5.	Lyons, N. Philippi, 1488, 4to, and De Vingle, 1497, fol.
6, 7.	Paris, De Marnes, 1503 and 1514, 8vo.
8.	Lyons, S. Vincentii, 1535, 8vo.

== See also ==
- Aylesford Priory

== Sources ==
- Copsey, Richard (2004). "Maidstone [Maydestone], Richard (d. 1396), Carmelite friar, theologian, and poet". Oxford Dictionary of National Biography (online ed.). Oxford University Press. doi:10.1093/ref:odnb/17803. (Subscription or UK public library membership required.)

Attribution:

- This article incorporates text from a publication now in the public domain: Kingsford, Charles Lethbridge (1893). "Maidstone, Richard". In Lee, Sidney (ed.). Dictionary of National Biography. Vol. 35. London: Smith, Elder & Co. pp. 339–340.
