= Michael Livingston =

American medieval literature professor and novelist

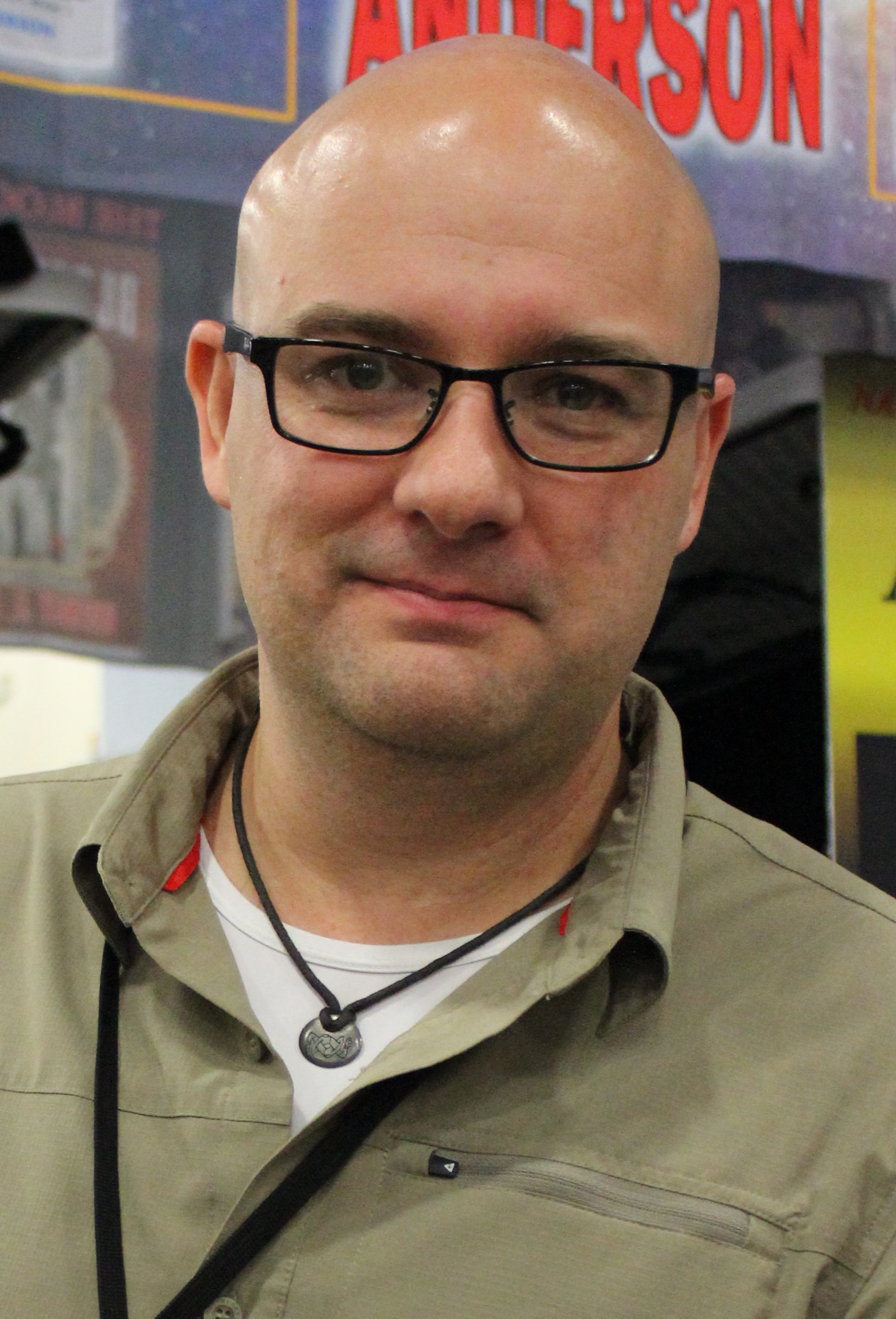
- Livingston at the Florida Supercon in 2016
- Born: Colorado, U.S.
- Education: Baylor University (BA); Western Michigan University (MA); University of Rochester (MA, PhD)
- Occupations: Historian; professor; novelist
- Writing career
- Genres: History; historical fantasy
- Notable work: The Shards of Heaven
- Website: michaellivingston.com

Michael Livingston is an American historian, a professor of medieval literature, and a historical fantasy novelist. His 2015 debut novel, The Shards of Heaven, has been followed by two sequels.

== Education and career ==
Originally from Colorado, Livingston has a B.A. in history from Baylor University, an M.A. in medieval studies from Western Michigan University, and both an M.A. and a Ph.D. in English from the University of Rochester. He has been a professor at The Citadel in Charleston, South Carolina, since 2006.

== Television ==
Michael Livingston is the co-star on the Discovery Channel TV show Contact, in which he skeptically examines potential evidence for the existence of extraterrestrial life and its impact on Earth.

Livingston is also the presenter of a number of documentaries on the History Hit Network. Ranging from William Wallace and Owain Glyndwr through to Magna Carta and the Agincourt campaign of Henry V

== Writing ==
Livingston has published multiple academic works. He has written numerous articles on the world of J. R. R. Tolkien, Beowulf, Chaucer, James Joyce and Robert Jordan.

Livingston said in 2015, "one of the key bits of advice I ever received as a young novelist-to-be was to try to cut my teeth on writing short stories ... starting with short stories was vital to the development of my career". Livingston's debut novel, The Shards of Heaven, was published by Tor Books in November 2015. Two sequels have subsequently been published.

=== Middle English translations ===
- Livingston, Michael, ed. (2004). Siege of Jerusalem. Kalamazoo: Medieval Institute Publications. ISBN 978-1-58044-090-5.
- Gower, John (2006). Livingston, Michael (ed.). In Praise of Peace. Kalamazoo: Medieval Institute Publications. ISBN 978-1-58044-097-4.
- Livingston, Michael, ed. (2011). Middle English Metrical Paraphrase of the Old Testament. Kalamazoo: Medieval Institute Publications. ISBN 978-1-58044-150-6.

=== Academia ===
- Livingston, Michael; Sutton, John William (2006). "Reinventing the Hero: Gardner's Grendel and the Shifting Face of Beowulf in Popular Culture". Studies in Popular Culture. 29 (1): 1–16. JSTOR 23418069.
- Livingston, Michael (2006). "Quantum physics: Dr Williamson and the master speed". Nature. 443 (370). doi:10.1038/443370a.
- Livingston, Michael, ed. (2011). The Battle of Brunanburh: A Casebook. University of Exeter Press. ISBN 978-0-85989-863-8.
- Livingston, Michael; Bollard, John K., eds. (2013). Owain Glyndŵr: A Casebook. Liverpool University Press. ISBN 978-0-85989-884-3.
- Livingston, Michael; DeVries, Kelly, eds. (2015). The Battle of Crécy: A Casebook. United Kingdom: Liverpool University Press. ISBN 978-1-78138-264-6.
- Livingston, Michael (2021). Never Greater Slaughter: Brunanburh and the Birth of England. Oxford, UK: Osprey Publishing.
- Livingston, Michael (2022). Crécy: Battle of Five Kings. Osprey Publishing.
- Livingston, Michael (2023). Agincourt: Battle of the Scarred King. Oxford, UK: Osprey Publishing.
- Livingston, Michael (2025). Bloody Crowns: A New History of the Hundred Years War (US ed.). Basic Books.
- Livingston, Michael (2025). The Two Hundred Years War: The Bloody Crowns of England and France, 1292–1492 (UK ed.). Bloomsbury Publishing.

=== General non-fiction ===
- Livingston, Michael (2022). Origins of the Wheel of Time: The Legends and Mythologies that Inspired Robert Jordan. New York, NY: Tor Books. ISBN 9781250860521.

=== Fiction ===
==== Short stories ====
- Livingston, Michael (2005). "The Keeper Alone". L. Ron Hubbard Presents Writers of the Future. 21 (novelette). Galaxy Press. ISBN 978-1-59212-217-2.
- Livingston, Michael (2005). "The Hand that Binds". Black Gate. 9 (short story).
- Livingston, Michael (2011). "Purging Cocytus". Black Gate. 15 (short story).
- Livingston, Michael (2015). "At the End of Babel". Tor.com (short story).
- Livingston, Michael (2016). "The Temples of the Ark" (Shards of Heaven). Amazon Kindle (short story).

Livingston's 2011 collection Angels Among Other Things, self-published via e-book, consisted of nine short stories, including "The Keeper Alone" and "At the End of Babel".

==== Novels ====
- Livingston, Michael (2015). The Shards of Heaven. Tor Books. ISBN 978-0-76538-031-9.
- Livingston, Michael (2016). The Gates of Hell. Tor Books. ISBN 978-0-76538-033-3.
- Livingston, Michael (2017). The Realms of God. Tor Books. ISBN 978-0-76538-035-7.

=== Anthologies edited ===
- Livingston, Michael; Schoen, Lawrence M., eds. (2007). Prime Codex. Paper Golem. ISBN 978-0-97953-490-4.
- Rambo, Cat (2009). Livingston, Michael; Schoen, Lawrence M. (eds.). Eyes Like Sky and Coal and Moonlight. Paper Golem. ISBN 978-0-97953-494-2.
