= Anna Paues =

Swedish philologist

Anna Carolina Paues (26 September 1867 – 2 September 1945), was a Swedish philologist, mainly active in England.

== Life ==
Her father was the senior master sergeant Johan Wilhelm Paues (1837–1920) and her mother was Gustava Anderson. Paues' best-known siblings were Johan (1876–1942), a businessman and diplomat and Erik (1879–1952), head of the central organization for the Swedish textile industry.

She graduated from Wallinska skolan in Stockholm, and studied Germanic philology in England and Germany. Paues became PhD at the Uppsala University in 1902, one of the first women in Sweden to obtain this degree in Germanic languages.

Between 1902 and 1927, she was a lecturer at Newnham College in Cambridge in Germanic linguistics. There was no chair in English in Sweden at the time. Her teachings on Chaucer were particularly appreciated.

Paues was a founding member of the English Society for City names. She successfully fostered the student exchange between England and Sweden.

One of Paues' students was Gunnar Heckscher, later a professor and leader of the Conservative Party in Sweden. Paues was in touch with many Swedish authors like Selma Lagerlöf and Ellen Key.

Paues was awarded the title of Professor by the Swedish Government in 1934, the first woman to receive this honour.

One of her English friends wrote in Paues' death notice: "Her capacity of making friends included old as well as young". Paues was also an important link between Sweden and England and well known within her field of science.

== Works ==
- A Fourteenth Century English Biblical Version (1902)
- A Newly Discovered Manuscript of the Poema Morale
- A Treatise on English Pronunciation by James Douglas (1914)
