= Constitutions of Oxford =

The Constitutions of Oxford or Constitutiones Thomae Arundel were several resolutions of the 1407 university convocation intended to deal with the use of Scripture in lectures and sermons at Oxford University, following disturbances caused by the followers of the teachings of the late John Wycliffe. Soon afterwards they were extended to at least southern England by a 1408 council of the Province of Canterbury.

== Constitutions ==
The 1407 constitutions initially regulated Oxford University. Notable were:

- Similiter quia (no. 5) ruled that elementary courses should not include controversial or novel expositions of Scripture.
- Quia insuper (no. 6) banned teaching material by Wycliff or similar unless or until they had been approved.
- Periculosa (no. 7) said that no new vernacular translations "in the form of a book, booklet or tract" should be made without prior permission, and even recent translations should be used only with the Bishop's or provincial council's approval.

The constitutions were extended to be in effect throughout at least the Catholic Province of Canterbury in 1409.

== Interpretation ==
There have been a variety of interpretations of Periculosa in particular over the years.

- That it made the possession and use of vernacular scripture illegal. This is not found in the text. Nevertheless, it seems to have been the received wisdom by the 1500s. Protestant polemicist John Foxe was perplexed that there seemed to be no actual legal basis for prosecutions he was convinced had occurred.
- That reading or ownership did not require permission, just translation.
- That it required a layman who wanted to read newish vernacular scripture or translations to obtain permission from his bishop. This is the view held by leading Tudor lawyer Thomas More, who wrote of having seen older non-Wycliffean vernacular translations in the libraries of great houses, as well as the view of the author of the preface to the 1582 Rheims New Testament.
- That publication required a bishop's permission, but perhaps not the act of translation itself. This is a view associated with William Tyndale by historian David Daniell.

Another controversy is over the size of a text that would be deemed a new translation: some writers even claim that any translation of a single sentence would be banned; however, this would make sermons untenable. Historian Sarah James notes that Bishop Reginald Pecock, a man with enemies, continued to write vernacular works with his own renditions of scriptural verses yet faced no censure.
