= Anne Wheathill =

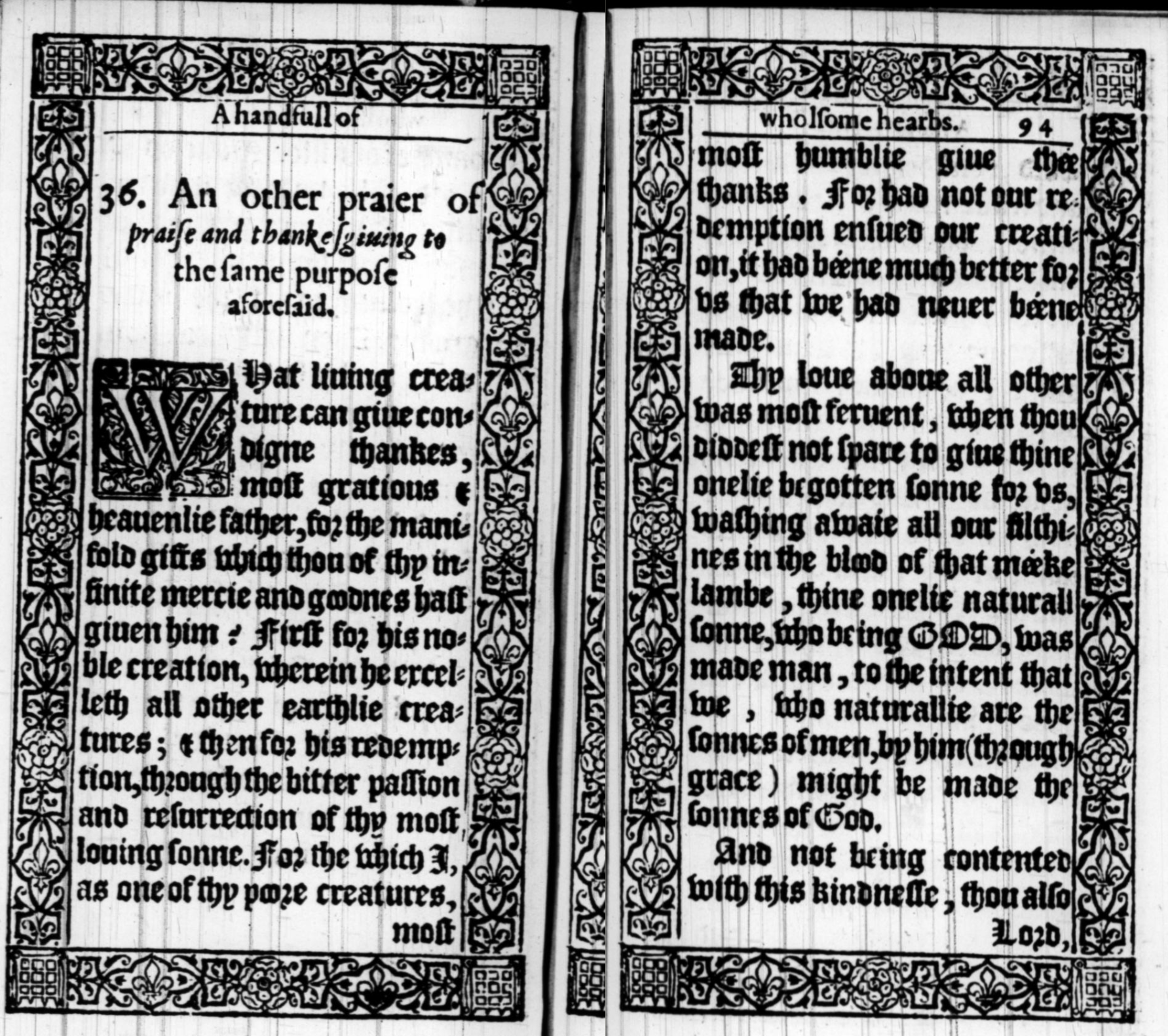
Prayer 36 from Wheathill's A hanfulll of hole-some (though homelie) hearbs

Anne Wheathill (fl. 1584) was an English poet known for A Handfull of Holesome (though Homelie) Hearbs, a collection of forty-nine prayers. A Handfull of Holesome (though Homelie) Hearbs is the first nonaristocratic English gentlewoman's book of prayers. Characteristic to the period, the Reformist prayers' topics include admission of transgressions, entreaty for forgiveness, the glory of God, and connection to the divine. The collection was published by Henry Denham. The only known original copy of A Handfull of Holesome (though Homelie) Hearbs is held by the Folger Shakespeare Library.
