= Paris Bible =

13th century edition of the Bible

The Paris Bible (Latin: Biblia Parisiensia) was a standardized codex arrangement of the Vulgate Latin Bible originally produced in Paris in the 13th century. These bibles signalled a significant change in the organization and structure of medieval bibles and were the template upon which the structure of the modern bible is based.

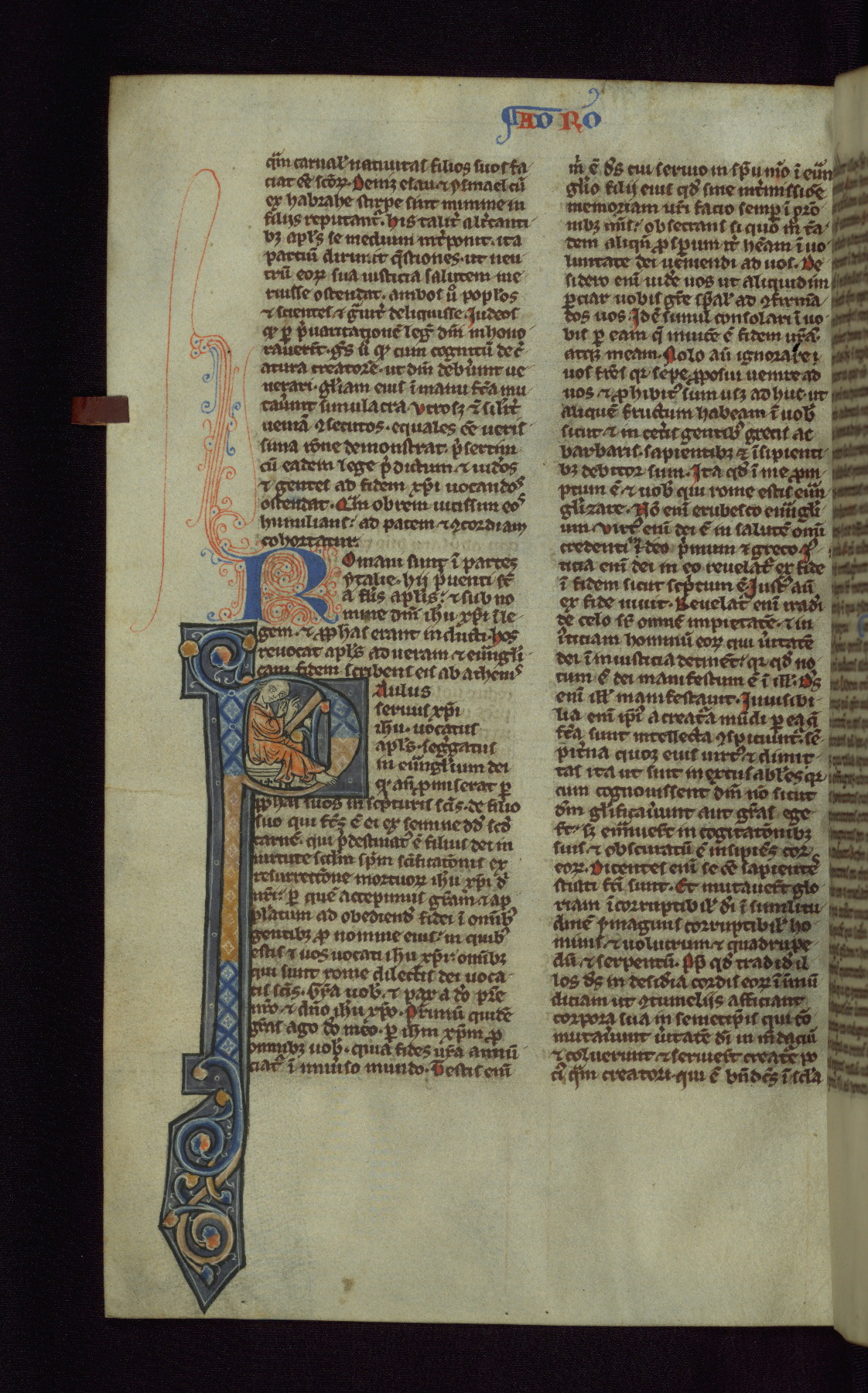
Leaf from a Paris Bible. Illustration shows St. Peter writing

Up to the beginning of the 13th century there was no single structure for the order of the biblical books, and it was often presented in 4 volumes. The Paris Bible was unique for its time; it was a pandect (complete single volume) with a uniform order, which is similar to the order of the modern Bible used today. Between 1230 and 1280 AD this bible was copied more frequently and spread more widely across Europe than any other copy of the Bible.

Many Paris Bibles were produced as small pocket bibles.

== Common characteristics ==
Paris Bible is the name given to bibles produced by scribes mainly in Paris and areas of Northern France although examples are believed to have originated in England and Italy. However, scholars caution that the term is used too broadly as it is often confused with the 'pocket bible' which is applied to bibles produced from the 12th century onwards. These were small enough to be carried in a saddle or travelling bag or indeed a pocket.

Scholars apply the term to bibles which possess a number of common characteristics. Each pandect contained the Deuterocanonical books (though not the apocryphal Epistle to the Laodiceans or the Fourth Book of Esdras), 64 prologues mostly based on the commentaries of Jerome and most have an index of the interpretations of Hebrew names (IHN). Whilst the thirteenth century bibles were divided into chapters, they were yet to include numbered verses.

== Structure and format ==
The Bibles varied, especially by region, from almost 20 by 12 cm, to a small 13 by 8 cm. The smaller "pocket" versions were intended for traveling friars.

Scholars have disputed the fact that all Paris Bibles were single volume manuscripts as several two volume Bibles are still in existence. Several leading book historians have suggested that, where there is evidence of highly decorated pages mid-way through a one volume Bible, it is evidence of a two-volume manuscript being rebound at a later date as one volume.

== Readers and owners ==
The explosion of the mendicant orders of preaching friars, in particular the Franciscans and Dominicans, lead to innovation in manuscript Bible design and manufacture:

Friars differed from monks in that they did not reside in closed communities but went out to live and preach in society. As they renounced possessions and travelled extensively to preach, they required small books which could be carried on their person. The orders of friars were remarkably successful, and as every preaching friar was required to have a Bible, pocket Bibles would have been required, according to de Hamel, in their thousands – a fact which accounts for their relative prevalence today.

— Libby Melzer, State Library of Victoria

20,000 small-format Paris Bibles are estimated to have been produced in the 13th century alone, in France, Italy and England.

The founding of a flurry of universities in the thirteenth century can be regarded as one of the major changes which determined how the Bible would change. One of the often-heard comments of the Paris Bible is that it was designed for studying the newly-introduced scholastic theology. Mendicant Orders also created schools (studia) which had, at the heart of the education program, an academic study of the scriptures. It was these changes which led to the desire to rearrange the format of the Bible in order that students, masters and preachers could retrieve information effectively. Adding reading aids like running headers and chapter numbers allowed readers to find the Books of the Bible and essential text.
