= Middle English Metrical Paraphrase of the Old Testament =

The Middle English Metrical Paraphrase of the Old Testament is a retelling of the Old Testament in Middle English rhyme for lay people, dated to the early fifteenth century, c. 1400-1410. Over 18,000 verses long, it exists in two manuscripts from the middle of the fifteenth century, both written in a Northern dialect from the Yorkshire area.

== Form ==
The poem contains 1531 stanzas of twelve lines usually rhyming ABABABABCDCD, for a total of 18,372 verses. The stanzas consist of three quatrains, the first two in tetrameter, the last in trimeter.

== Manuscripts ==
The two manuscripts containing the Metrical Paraphrase are MS Selden supra 52 (Bodleian 3440), fols. 2a-168a (S), and MS Longleat 257, fols. 119a-212a (L), a manuscript in the private collection of the Marquess of Bath. The two manuscripts are not directly related; that is to say, they are not derived from one another, nor from a common manuscript (Kalén, p. xxxiv). Both date from 1425–75 and are, like the original, written in a Northern dialect. According to Kalén, the Midland scribe who produced L purposely adapted the language to be more easily read by non-Northern readers.

== Available editions ==
- Russell A. Peck, ed. The Middle English Metrical Paraphrase of the Old Testament (selection). In Heroic Women from the Old Testament in Middle English Verse. Kalamazoo, Michigan: Medieval Institute Publications, 1991
- Herbert Kalén, ed. A Middle English Metrical Paraphrase of the Old Testament. Goteborgs Hogskolas Arsskrift 28. Goteborg: Elanders Boktryckeri Aktiebolag, 1923. (Contains the first 500 stanzas.)
- Urban Ohlander, ed. A Middle English Metrical Paraphrase of the Old Testament. Vols. 2-4, plus vol. 5: Glossary. Gothenburg Studies in English 5, 11, 16, 24. Stockholm: Almqvist and Wiksell, 1955, 1960, 1963, 1972.
- Livingston, Michael, ed. (2011). Middle English Metrical Paraphrase of the Old Testament. Kalamazoo: Medieval Institute Publications. ISBN 978-1-58044-150-6.
