= Nicholas Love (monk) =

- Born: Unknown; Unknown
- Died: c. 1424
- Occupation: Carthusian monk
- Known for: Translator, religious writer, reformer
- Title: Prior of Mount Grace

Nicholas Love, also known as Nicholas Luff (died c. 1424), was first a Benedictine and then a Carthusian monk in medieval England, and became the first prior of Mount Grace charterhouse in Yorkshire. He was the translator and reviser of a popular devotional treatise which was used by the Church authorities to counter the teaching of John Wycliffe. In his later years he convinced Henry V of England to attempt to reform Benedictine monasticism in England, but died before measures could be taken.

== Life as a monk ==
Although he spent his mature years as a Carthusian prior, he was originally a Benedictine monk, perhaps of Freiston, a cell founded in 1114 of the Benedictine Crowland Abbey in Lincolnshire and which within a short time became a priory. As the first prior of Mount Grace charterhouse, Love was preceded by three "rectors", as the Carthusian Order names the superiors of houses not yet formally incorporated (an early charter names Robert Tredwye, or Trethewy–the first rector–as first prior). Love was the fourth rector, promoted to prior upon the incorporation of Mount Grace in 1411. The latest documentary occurrence of his name is 15 March 1423, and his death, as "former prior" is recorded in 1424.

== Devotional writing ==
Love translated the popular fourteenth-century Franciscan devotional manual Meditations on the Life of Christ (Latin: Meditationes Vitae Christi or Meditationes De Vita Christi; Italian: Meditazione della vita di Cristo) into English, as The Mirror of the Blessed Life of Jesus Christ. The Meditationes was at the time attributed to St Bonaventure, but is now recognised to be by an unknown author, and hence is attributed to Pseudo-Bonaventure, although attempts have been made to identify its author, and it is possible that it was written by an Italian Franciscan, Giovanni de' Cauli (Johannes de Caulibus).

Around the year 1410, Love submitted his Mirror to Thomas Arundel, Archbishop of Canterbury, in conformity with the strictures of the Oxford Constitutions of 1407–09, which had forbidden all new translations of biblical material in any form, without the submission of the material to the local bishop for approval. The archbishop had taken this action in an attempt to stop the circulation of the Wycliffite translation of the Bible and other heretical Wycliffite (Lollard) writings.

Love's translation in fact includes a number of substantial interpolations into the original Latin text. These aim to argue specifically against the positions of John Wycliffe and his followers, as for example on the Church hierarchy, almsgiving, and the sacraments of Penance and the Eucharist. An additional chapter on the Eucharist is sometimes referred to separately, as A Short Treatise of the Highest and Most Worthy Sacrament of Christ's Body and Its Miracles.

Archbishop Arundel not merely approved of Love's translation, but personally endorsed and commanded its circulation, and it appears to have been disseminated in manuscript primarily from the early fifteenth-century book production centres in London and Westminster, rather than from Mount Grace Charterhouse.

The Mirror was remarkably popular: there are 64 surviving manuscripts and 6 printings made before 1535.

== Reform agitator ==
Later in life, Love complained to King Henry V about the laxity of the discipline of the Benedictine monks in England, inciting him to call an extraordinary convocation of the Order at Westminster to answer a bill of thirteen charges that Love, a former Benedictine himself, had apparently drawn up. Love was one of the King's three delegates to the reform commission that derived from this convocation, but both he and the king died before any actual reforms were effected.

== See also ==
- Ludolph of Saxony
