= The Mirror of the Blessed Life of Jesus Christ =

1400 book by Nicholas Love

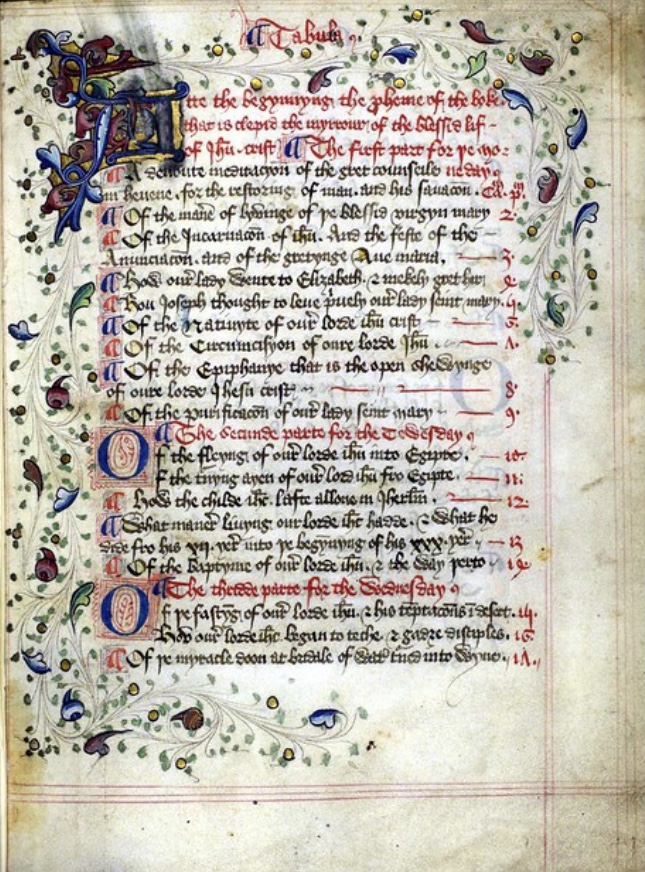
Myrrour of the blessed lyf of Jesu Christ, MS page by Stephen Dodesham, ca. 1475

The Mirror of the Blessed Life of Jesus Christ is an adaptation/translation of Pseudo-Bonaventure's Meditations on the Life of Christ into English by Nicholas Love, the Carthusian prior of Mount Grace Priory, written ca. 1400.

Not merely a translation of one of the most popular Latin works of Franciscan devotion on the life and passion of Christ, but an expanded version with polemical additions against the Wycliffite (Lollard) positions on the ecclesiastical hierarchy and the sacraments of penance and the eucharist, Love's Mirror was submitted to Thomas Arundel, archbishop of Canterbury, around the year 1410 for approval. This submission was in accordance with the strictures of the Oxford Constitutions, forbidding any new biblical translations written since the time of John Wycliffe, in any form whatsoever, unless the translation was submitted to the local bishop for approval.

Arundel not merely approved the Mirror, but commanded its propagation.

Love's additions include quotations from Augustine, Pope Gregory I, Aelred of Rievaulx, and Henry Suso. Love considered his additions to be marginal annotations and separated them from the Pseudo-Bonaventure text with special markings.

It survives in sixty-four manuscripts. It appears to have been the most popular new piece of literature in fifteenth century England and was published at least ten times between 1484 and 1606.
