= Peter John Olivi =

French Franciscan theologian and philosopher

Peter John Olivi, also Pierre de Jean Olivi or Petrus Joannis Olivi (Note: Several different French reconstructions of the Latin name Petrus Joannis Olivi have been proposed, including Pierre de Jean Olieu, Pierre Déjean Olieu, Pierre Janolieu, etc. He came from an Occitan-speaking region and in Occitan his name would be Peire Johan-Oliu.) (1248 – 14 March 1298), was a French Franciscan theologian and philosopher who, although he died professing the faith of the Roman Catholic Church, remained a controversial figure in the arguments surrounding poverty at the beginning of the 14th century. In large part, this was due to his view that the Franciscan vow of poverty also entailed usus pauper (i.e., 'poor' or 'restricted' use of goods). While contemporary Franciscans generally agreed that usus pauper was important to the Franciscan way of life, they disagreed that it was part of their vow of poverty. His support of the rigorous view of ecclesiastical poverty played a part in the ideology of the groups coming to be known as the Spiritual Franciscans or Fraticelli.

== Biography ==
Born at Sérignan, Diocese of Béziers, 1247/48, at twelve he entered the Friars Minor at Béziers, studied at Montpellier, and later attended the University at Paris. He was present there in 1268, when Bonaventure gave his Collationes de septem donis Spiritus sancti, and was probably still there in 1273 for Bonaventure's Collationes in Hexaemeron. Returning to his native province, he taught in different places, and was probably in Narbonne around 1277–79.

During the preparation of Nicholas III's Bull Exiit qui seminat, in the summer of 1279, Olivi accompanied his provincial minister to Italy, but was not himself part of the commission that worked on the Bull. He was asked to express briefly his opinion with regard to Franciscan poverty, but composed much longer questions on the evangelical perfection. Upon his return to Languedoc, he was accepted as lecturer in philosophy at the University of Montpellier, but later turned to Scripture Studies. He produced a number of biblical commentaries: Genesis, Isaiah, Job, Matthew, John, Romans, and Revelation, among others. One opponent (described as "brother Ar.", to be identified with Arnaud Gaillard, then a formed bachelor back from Paris) voiced his opposition to Olivi's views on the Franciscan vow of poverty, which prompted him to write a Treatise on poor use (De usu paupere). The controversy between the two young theologians raged on many different issues, which attracted the attention of the General Chapter of Strasbourg in 1282. Only Olivi's fate is recorded, but both were probably suspended from teaching. His doctrine was examined by seven Franciscan theologians at Paris, who first drew up a list of errors (Littera septem sigillorum) and then substantiated it by a roll (rotulus) of citations from Olivi's writings.

Olivi defended himself in several responses (1283–85), and finally the General Chapter of Montpellier (1287) decided in his favor. The new general superior, Matthew of Aquasparta, sent him as lector in theology to the convent of Santa Croce in Florence. Next, Matthew's successor, Raymond Gaufredi, sent Olivi back to Montpellier as lector in theology. At the General Chapter of Paris in 1292, Olivi again gave explanations, which were apparently satisfactory. He spent his last years in the convent of Narbonne lecturing and writing his masterwork on the Apocalypse of John, revising his commentary on the Sentences of Peter Lombard, corresponding, and acting as pastor to a community of "Spiritual" Franciscans and devout laypersons. He died surrounded by his friends, who familiarly called him "Saint Peter," after an earnest profession of his Catholic Faith (published by Wadding ad a. 1297, n. 33) on 14 March 1298.

== Characteristic teaching ==
A glance at Olivi's literary output indicates—considering his relatively short life of fifty years, full-time teaching duties, and lost years when he lived under the cloud that “Friar Ar.” cast over him—that he was remarkably productive. A near contemporary stated, not quite accurately, that he had written commentaries on every book in the Bible: he never fulfilled his plan to comment on the prophecy of Daniel or the epistles to the Corinthians.

Olivi commented on the Lombard's Sentences—much of Book III and IV, and all of Book II in which he demonstrated himself to be an unsurpassed proponent of human free will. He was also a prominent critic of Averroës. His indirect, fragmentary commentary on Lombard Book I, De Deo Cognoscendo, is published as an appendix to the commentary on the Lombard's Sentences Book II (pp. 525–554). His argument there carries Anselm's ontological argument to its fullness by affirming the superlative perfection (summe infinitum) of all of God's attributes in a way analogous to, and reflective of, Olivi's “superabundant hermeneutics” of the Apocalypse (See Lewis, Olivi’s Revelation, “Olivi’s Superabundant Hermeneutics”).

Olivi's thinking and large body of writing on “evangelical poverty” has been much discussed, and made of him the leader of the so-called “Spiritual Franciscans,” oft maligned by the 14th-century papacy and others more interested in wealth than in the spirituality of Gospel self-control. He was a consistent believer in, and practitioner of, the holy life as taught by Jesus, lived by the Apostles, and restored to the church by Francis of Assisi, without, however, indulging in the personal extremism that characterized certain skeletal figures. Olivi's work on contracts demonstrates his ability to think outside the realm of religion, and his balanced and reasonable attitude towards the appropriate use of money. Olivi was interested in practical matters as well as philosophy. His work On Sale, Purchase, Usury and Restitution, or more simply On Contracts (as in the latest edition by S. Piron, 2012), contains a subtle discussion of the pricing of risks and probabilities in connection with valuing compensation due for compulsory requisitioning of property. This work has earned for Olivi a place in the history of the development of thinking about the right use of capital.

Olivi's rethinking of the meaning of the Bible on it own terms, apart from Aristotelian categories, in some cases led to a refreshing reliance on the simple meaning of the text, and in other cases to an unparalleled theological inventiveness. Olivi was unique in the 13th century, for example, in his realization of the Jewish quality of the Apocalypse (cf. Lewis, Olivi’s Revelation, “Olivi and the Jews”). He identified the “144,000 Friends of the Lamb” (Rev 7:4-8,14:1-5) as a Jewish, militant wing of the Church of the Endtime. Fascinated by Jewish music, Olivi, described the two wings of the Apocalyptic army, Jew and Gentile, as playing their harps and singing a twofold song in unison, the Song of Moses and the Lamb (Rev 15:3). Olivi foresaw a reunion of Jew and Gentile in the one People of God at the End as it had been at the Beginning. Quite the reverse of the Churchmen and Royals who in 1306, scarcely eight years after Olivi's death, led France and Olivi's neighbors into yet another spasm of European anti-semitism.

== Legacy and controversy ==
Controversy continued after his death. His friends, friars and laity alike, venerated their leader, and even honored his tomb as that of a saint; on the other hand, the General Chapter of Lyon in 1299, ordered his writings to be collected and burned as heretical.

The General Council of Vienne in 1312 established in the Decretal Fidei catholicæ fundamento (Bull. Franc., V, 86) the Catholic doctrine against three points of Olivi's teaching, although without mentioning Olivi by name. These points were:

- the moment when Christ's body on the cross was transfixed by the lance
- the manner in which the soul is united to the body
- the baptism of infants.

In 1318, anti-Olivi Friars destroyed Olivi's tomb, and are presumed to have thrown his body in the Rhône River. In the next year, two further steps were taken against him. His writings were absolutely forbidden by the General Chapter of Marseilles, and a special commission of theologians examined Olivi's Lectura super Apocalypsim and marked sixty sentences as heretical, chiefly citations of Joachim of Flora. In 1326, those sentences were condemned by Pope John XXII when the use of them by Emperor Louis IV the Bavarian in his Appeal of Sachsenhausen (1324) came to the attention of the Pope. Though Olivi was never officially condemned as a heretic, his name was included as a banned author in several editions of the Index of Prohibited Books.

Franz Ehrle considers (Archiv, III, 440) that Olivi was not the impious heretic that he was painted to be in some writings of his opponents, and states (ibid., 448) that the denunciation of his theological doctrine was rather a tactical measure of the adversaries of the rigorous principles of poverty and reform professed by Olivi. It is clear that Olivi follows in many points the doctrine of St. Bonaventure, but equally clear that in his Lectura super Apocalypsim he was a thoroughgoing follower of Joachim, which, for some, was enough to mark him as a heretic.

== Writings ==
The numerous works of Olivi, many of them now critically edited, can be divided into six classes:

=== Philosophic works ===
- Bernhard Jansen (ed.). Quaestiones in secundum librum Sententiarum 3 vols. [= Summa Quaestionum, II]. Quaracchi, Collegium S. Bonaventurae, 1922–1926.
- Ferdinand Delorme (ed.). De perlegendis philosophorum libris. Antonianum 16 (1941): 31–44.
- Ferdinand Delorme (ed.).Quid ponat ius vel dominium. Antonianum 20 (1945): 309–330. Revised edition, S. Piron, Oliviana, 5, 2016, on line : http://journals.openedition.org/oliviana/882
- Stephen Brown (ed.).Quaestiones logicales. Traditio 42 (1986): 337–388.
- Sylvain Piron (ed.). Quaestio de locutionibus angelorum. Oliviana, 1, 2003.
- Sylvain Piron (ed., trans.) Tractatus de contractibus.Traité des contrats. Paris, Les Belles-Lettres, 2012. English translation : Ryan Thornton, Michael Cusato (trans.) A Treatise on Contracts, Saint Bonaventure (NY), Franciscan Institute Publications, 2016. Portuguese translation : Joice Beatriz da Costa, Luis Alberto de Boni (trans). Tratado sobre os Contrato. Porto, Edições Afrontamento, 2016.
- S. Piron (ed.). Quaestio de divino velle et scire, Quaestio de ideis, Oliviana, 6, 2020, on line : http://journals.openedition.org/oliviana/977
- Giacomo Todeschini. Un trattato francescano di economia politica: il "De emptionibus et venditionibus, De usuris, De restitutionibus" di Pietro di Giovanni Olivi. Rome: Istituto Storico Italiano per il Medioevo. 1980.

=== Exegetical and hermeneutical works ===
- Marco Bartoli, Super Lamentationum Ieremie (ed.). in La Caduta di Gerusalemme. Il commento al Libro delle Lamentazioni di Pietro di Giovanni Olivi. Roma, ISIME, 1991.
- David Flood, Gedeon Gal (eds.). Peter of John Olivi on the Bible. Principia quinque in Sacram Scripturam, Postilla in Isaiam et in I ad Corinthios. St. Bonaventure, NY, Franciscan Institute Publications, 1997.
- Johannes Schlageter (ed.). Expositio in Canticum Canticorum. Grottaferrata, Frati editori di Quaracchi, 1999.
- David Flood (ed.). Peter of John Olivi on the Acts of the Apostles. St Bonaventure, NY, Franciscan Institute Publications, 2001.
- Johannes Schlageter (ed.). Lectura super Proverbia, Lectura super Ecclesiasten. Grottaferrata, Frati editori di Quaracchi, 2003.
- David Flood (ed.). Peter of John Olivi on Genesis. St Bonaventure, NY, Franciscan Institute Publications, 2006.
- Alain Boureau (ed.). Lecturae super Pauli Epistolas, Brepols (Corpus Christianorum Continuatio Mediaevalis, 233), 2010.
- Fortunato Iozzelli (ed.). Lectura Super Lucam et Lectura Super Marcum, Grottaferrata, Frati Editori di Quaracchi-Fondazione Collegio San Bonaventura, 2010.
- Sylvain Piron (ed.). Lectura super Mattheum, prologus, Oliviana 4 (2012) : http://oliviana.revues.org/498
- Warren Lewis (ed.), Lectura super Apocalypsim, Saint Bonaventure, NY, Franciscan Institute Publications, 2015; English edition, Peter of John Olivi: Commentary on the Apocalypse--Translation, Notes and Introduction, 2017.
- Alain Boureau (ed.), Lectura super Iob, Brepols (Corpus Christianorum Continuatio Mediaevalis, 275), 2015.
- Stefano Defraia (ed.).Quodlibeta quinque, inter alia, Questionibus de textualibus. Grottaferrata, Frati editori di Quaracchi, 2002.

=== Theological works ===
- Bernhard Jansen (ed.). Quaestiones De Deo Cognoscendo (Appendix), pp. 453–554. in Quaestiones in secundum librum Sententiarum 3 vols. [= Summa Quaestionum, II]. Quaracchi, Collegium S. Bonaventurae, 1922–1926.
- Ferdinand Delorme (ed.). Quaestio de angelicis influentiis, in Bonaventura. Collationes in Hexaemeron et bonaventuriana quaedam selecta. Quaracchi, 1934, pp. 363–412.
- Aquilino Emmen, Ernst Stadter (eds.). Quaestiones de incarnatione et redemptione. Quaestiones de virtutibus. Grottaferrata, Collegium San Bonaventurae, 1981.
- Pietro Maranesi (ed.). Quaestiones de novissimis ex Summa super IV Sententiarum. Grottaferrata: Editiones Collegii S. Bonaventurae, 2004.
- Michele Maccarone. (ed.) "Una questione inedita dell'Olivi sull'infallibilità del Papa". (Quaestiones de perfectione evangelica 12 ). Rivista della Chiesa in Italia. 3 (1949): 309–343.
- Livarius Oliger (ed.). "Petri Iohannis Olivi de renuntiatione papae Coelestini V quaestio et epistola". (QPE 13). Franciscanum Historicum. 11 (1918): 340–366.
- Marco Bartoli (ed.). Quaestiones de Romano pontifice. Grottaferrata, Frati editori di Quaracchi, 2002.
- Pierre Péano (ed.). "La Quaestio fr. Petri Iohannis Olivi sur l'indulgence de la Portiuncule", Archivum Franciscanum Historicum. 74 (1981): 64–76.

=== Works on observance of the Rule of Saint Francis and evangelical perfection ===
- David Flood (ed.). Peter Olivi's Rule Commentary. Edition and Presentation. Wiesbaden, F. Steiner, 1972.
- Aquilinus Emmen, Feliciano Simoncioli (ed.). "La dottrina dell'Olivi sulla contemplazione, la vita attiva e mista". (QPE 1-4 ). Studi Francescani, 60 (1963) : 382–445; 61 (1964): 108–167.
- Aquilinus Emmen (ed.). "La dottrina dell'Olivi sul valore religioso dei voti". (QPE 5). Francescani, 63 (1966): 88–108.
- Aquilinus Emmen (ed.). "Verginità e matrimonio nella valutazione dell'Olivi". (QPE 6). Studi Francescani, 64 (1967): 11–57.
- Johannes Schlageter (ed.). Das Heil der Armen und das Verderben der Reichen. Petrus Johannis Olivi, OFM, Die Frage nach der höchsten Armut. (QPE 8). Werl i. Westphalen, Dietrich-Coelde-Verlag, 1989.
- David Burr (ed.). De usu paupere. The Quaestio and the Tractatus, (QPE 9). Firenze-Perth, Leo S. Olschki-University of Western Australia Press, 1992.
- David Flood (ed.) "Peter Olivi Quaestio de mendicitate, critical édition". (QPE 10/15 ). Franciscanum Historicum, 87 (1994): 299-347.
- David Burr, David Flood (eds.). "Peter Olivi: On property and revenue". (QPE 16). Franciscan Studies, 40 (1980): 18-58.
- Ferdinand Delorme (ed.). "Fr. P. J. Olivi questio de voto regulam aliquam profitentis". (QPE 17 ).16 (1941): 131-164.

=== Apologetical works and letters ===
- Franz Ehrle (ed.). Epistola ad regis Siciliae filios. Archiv für Literatur- und Kirchengeschichte des Mittelalters, 3 (1887): 534-540.
- Albanus Heysse (ed.). De obitu fratris Petri Iohannis et quid receptis sacramentis dixit. "Descriptio codicis Bibliothecae Laurentaniae S. Crucis plut. 31 sin. cod. 3," Archivum franciscanum historicum, 11 (1918): 267-269.
- Damase Laberge (ed.). "Fr. Petri Iohannis Olivi, O.F.M., tria scripta sui ipsius apologetica annorum 1283 et 1285", Archivum Franciscanum Historicum, 28 (1935): 115-155, 374-407, 29 (1936): 98-141, 365-395.
- Sylvain Piron, Elsa Marmursztejn, Cynthia Kilmer (eds)."ad fratrem R.". Archivum Franciscanum Historicum, 91 (1998): 33–64.

=== Devotional works ===
- Dionisio Pacetti (ed.). Quaestiones quatuor de Domina. Quaracchi, Collegium S. Bonaventurae, 1954.
- Raoul Manselli (ed.). Modus quomodo quilibet postest referre gratias Deo de beneficiis ab eo receptis, Miles armatus, Informatio Petri Iohannis, Remedia contra temptationes spirituales. Roma, Spirituali e beghini in Provenza. ISIME, 1959, pp. 274–290.
- Antonio Montefusco. "L’opuscolo Miles armatus di Pierre de Jean Olieu. Edizione critica e commento". Studi Francescani. 108 (2011): 50–171.
