= Bernard of Besse =

Latin minor

Bernard of Besse was a French Friar Minor and chronicler.

He was a native of Aquitaine, with date of birth uncertain; he belonged to the custody of Cahors and was secretary to St. Bonaventure. He took up the pen after the Seraphic Doctor, he tells us, to gather the ears the latter had dropped from his sheaf, lest anything of so great a memory as that of St. Francis might perish.

== Works ==
His Liber de Laudibus Beati Francisci, composed about 1280, besides a resume of some of the earlier legends, contains brief and valuable information about the companions of St. Francis and the foundation of the three Franciscan Orders, and is the only thirteenth-century document which specifies the first biographies of St. Francis.

About 1297–1300 he compiled a catalogue of the ministers general up to his time, which is also a source of importance for the study of Franciscan history.

Critical editions of both these works have been published by the Friars Minor of Quaracchi [in Analecta Franciscana, III (1897), 666–707] and by Father Hilarin Felder of Lucerne, O. M. Cap. "Liber de Laudibus" etc. (Rome, 1897).

Bernard also wrote the life of Blessed Christopher of Cahors inserted in the Chronica XXIV Generalium (ed. Quaracchi, 1897, 161–173) and is very probably the author of the Speculum Disciplinae and of the Epistola ad Quendam Novitium erroneously attributed to St. Bonaventure (See Bonav. Opera Omnia ed. Quaracchi, 1898, VIII, 583 sqq. and 663 sqq.).

== Sources ==
- Luke Wadding, Scriptores Ord. Minorum (1650), 59, and Sbaralea, Supplementum (1806), 135
- Fabricius, Johann Albert, Bib. Med. Aev. (1734), 218
- Daunou, Histoire littéraire de la France (1838), XIX, 437
- Denifle, Archiv. f. litt. und Kirchengesch. des M. A. (1885), I, 145 sqq. and 630 sqq., also Misc. Francescana (1886), I, L sqq.
- Othon de Pavie, L'Aquitaine Seraphique (1900), I, passim.
- Thomas Ferencik OFM, "Das Buch über die drei Orden des hl. Franziskus" des Bernhard von Besse, Wissenschaft und Weisheit (1995), Bd. 58/2
