= Mendicant =

Person who relies primarily on alms

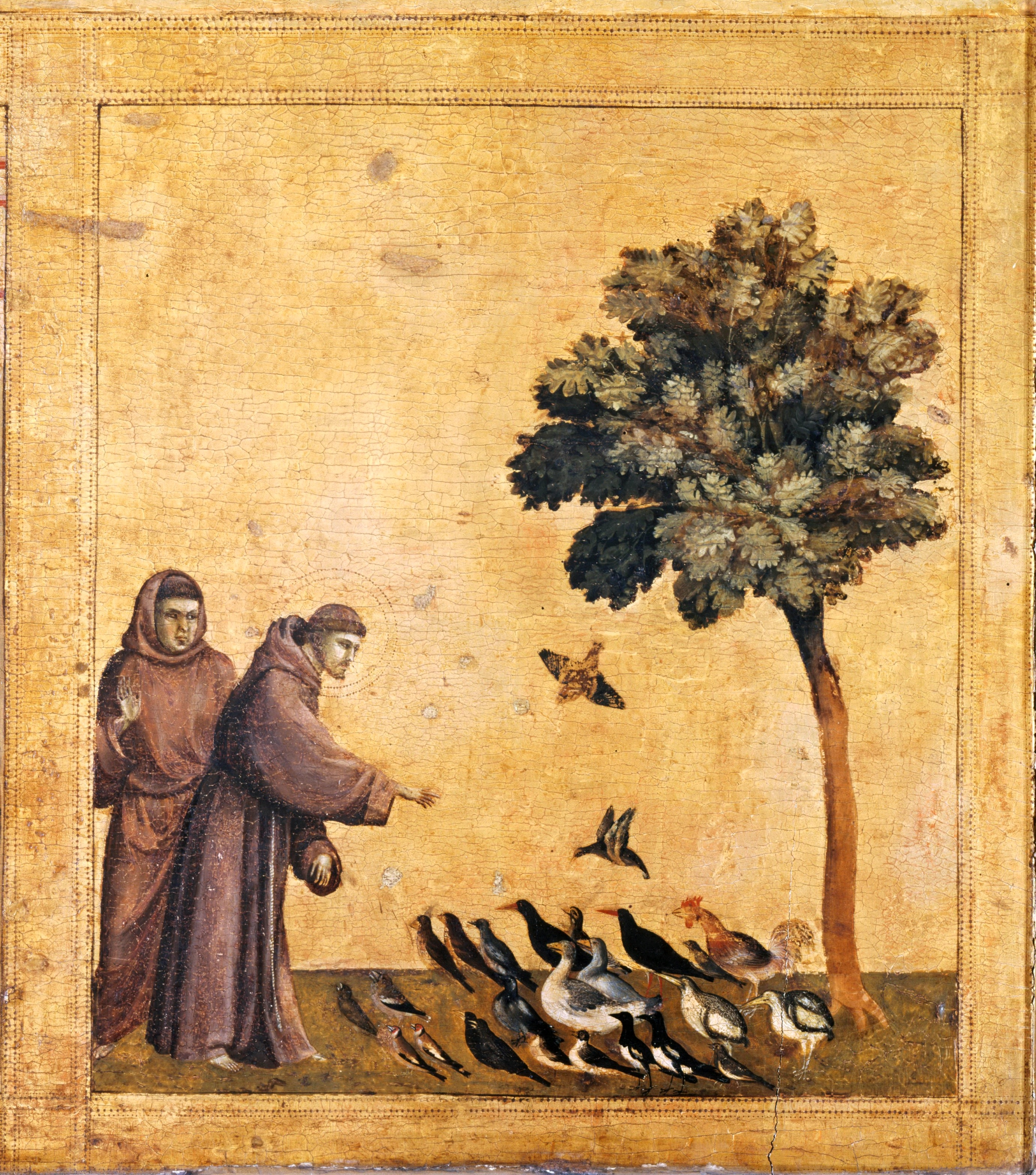
Francis of Assisi, the founder of the Order of Friars Minor

A mendicant (from Latin: mendicans, "begging") is one who practices mendicancy, relying chiefly or exclusively on alms to survive. Mendicant orders are primarily certain Catholic religious orders that depend entirely on the goodwill of others to live. The members of these orders have chosen radical poverty so as to bear witness to the Gospel. Arising with the development of cities and universities, these orders live in convents established in urban places and differ from monastic orders in that they live both the contemplative life and apostolic life.

== Religious practice ==
Many religious orders adhere to a mendicant way of life, including the Catholic mendicant orders, Hindu ascetics, some Sufi dervishes of Islam, and the monastic orders of Jainism and Buddhism.

While mendicants are the original type of monks in Buddhism and have a long history in Indian Hinduism and the countries which adapted Indian religious traditions, they did not become widespread in Christianity until the High Middle Ages. The Way of a Pilgrim depicts the life of an Eastern Christian mendicant.

== Christianity ==
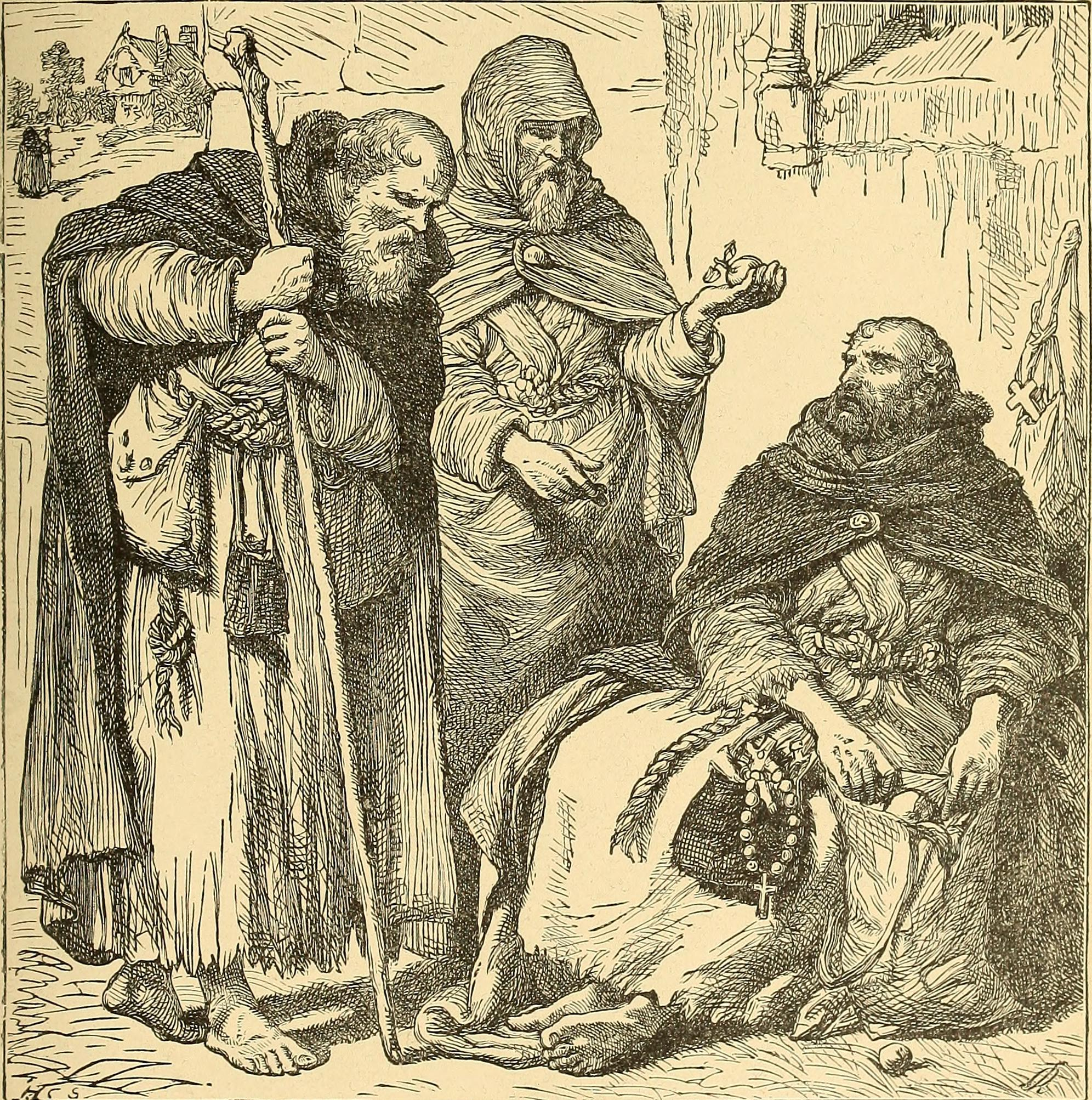
A group of mendicant friars

=== Catholic Church ===
In the early Latin Church, mendicants and itinerant preachers were looked down upon, and their preaching was suppressed. In the Rule of Saint Benedict, Benedict of Nursia referred to traveling monks as gyrovagues, and accused them of dangerously indulging their own wills. This behavior was compared negatively with the stationary nature of cenobite or anchorite monasticism.

In the early 13th century, the Catholic Church would see a revival of mendicant activity, as followers of Saint Francis of Assisi and Saint Dominic begged for food while preaching in villages. These men founded a form of communal life, referred to as mendicant orders. These orders were in stark contrast to the more powerful and conservative, monastic orders such as the Benedictines and Cistercians.

Itinerant preachers that belonged to mendicant orders traveled from town to town to preach the Gospel, consciously modeling themselves after Jesus and the Twelve Disciples. Professor Giacomo Todeschini at the University of Trieste has described these mendicants in the following way:

"The choice to be poor was realized in a series of gestures: abandonment of one's paternal house, a wandering life, ragged appearance and clothes, manual work as scullery-man and mason, and begging without shame."

=== Other denominations ===
Unlike Western Christians, Eastern Christians never created a form of monasticism equivalent to mendicant orders. Rather, all Orthodox monks and nuns follow the monastic Rule of Saint Basil. Mendicancy does, however, still find root through lay expressions of Foolishness for Christ.

Despite the abandoning of ascetic practice within Protestantism, mendicant-style preaching has still come about independently of it. American Methodists were once known for sending out itinerant preachers known as circuit riders. Another example was Johnny Appleseed, a Swedenborgian itinerant preacher who would eventually rise to the status of American folk hero.

== Buddhism ==
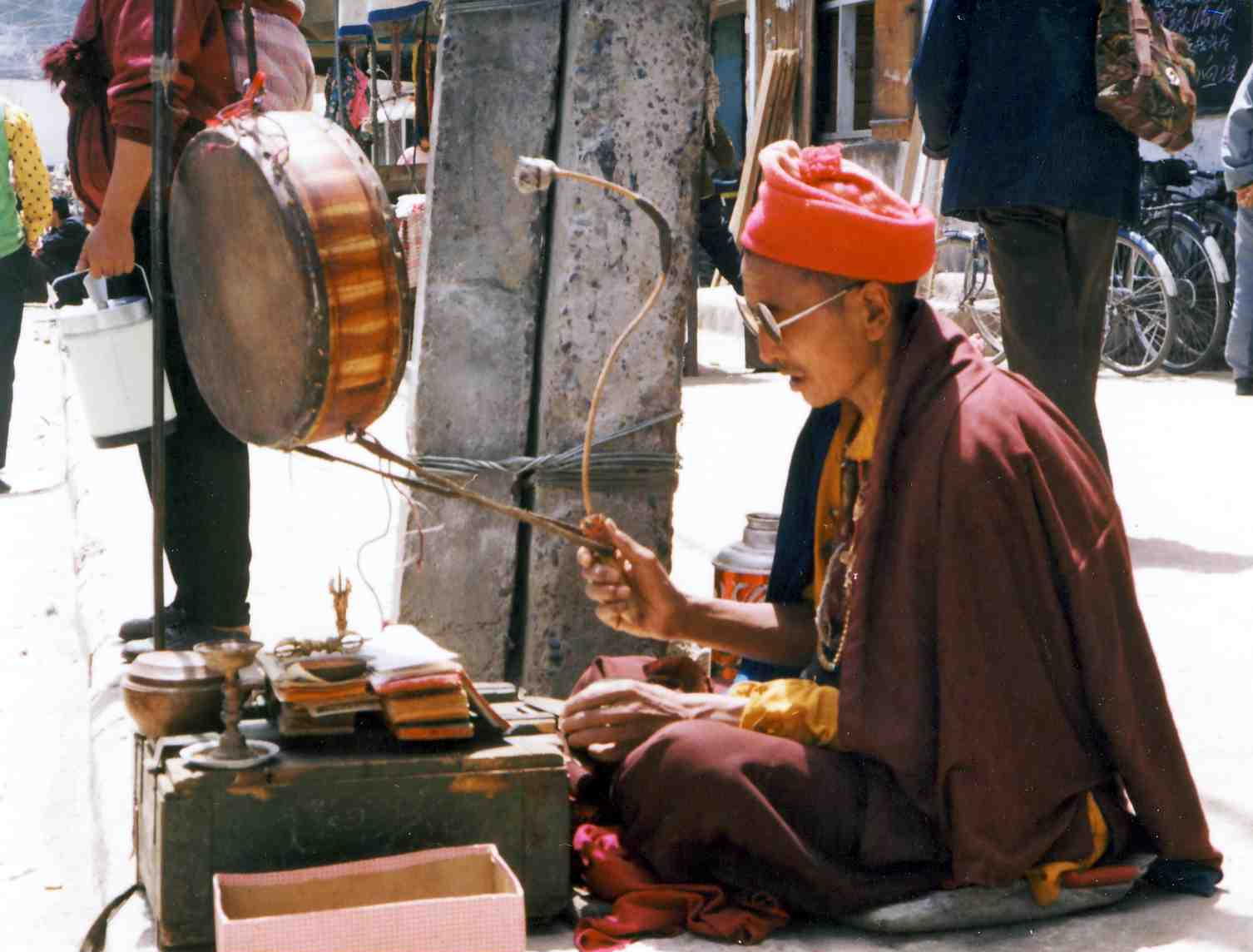
Mendicant monk reciting scriptures in Lhasa, Tibet, 1993

Buddhism is one of several religious traditions of ancient India that has an established practice of mendicancy. Monks of the Theravada traditions in Southeast Asia continue to practice alms round (Sanskrit and Pali: piṇḍapāta) as laid down by the Buddha. Food is procured from the faithful and divided equally among all members of the Sangha.

A major difference between Buddhist and Christian mendicancy is the understanding of manual labor as a means of support. While many Buddhist communities formulated limited forms of labor for monks, there also exists the understanding that a Buddhist monk must remain aloof from secular affairs. Many of these rules of decorum and acceptable livelihood are preserved in the Vinaya literature of several schools. The Sangha's immersion into the work of laymen and laywomen is also believed to be a sign of impending calamity.

=== Theravada ===
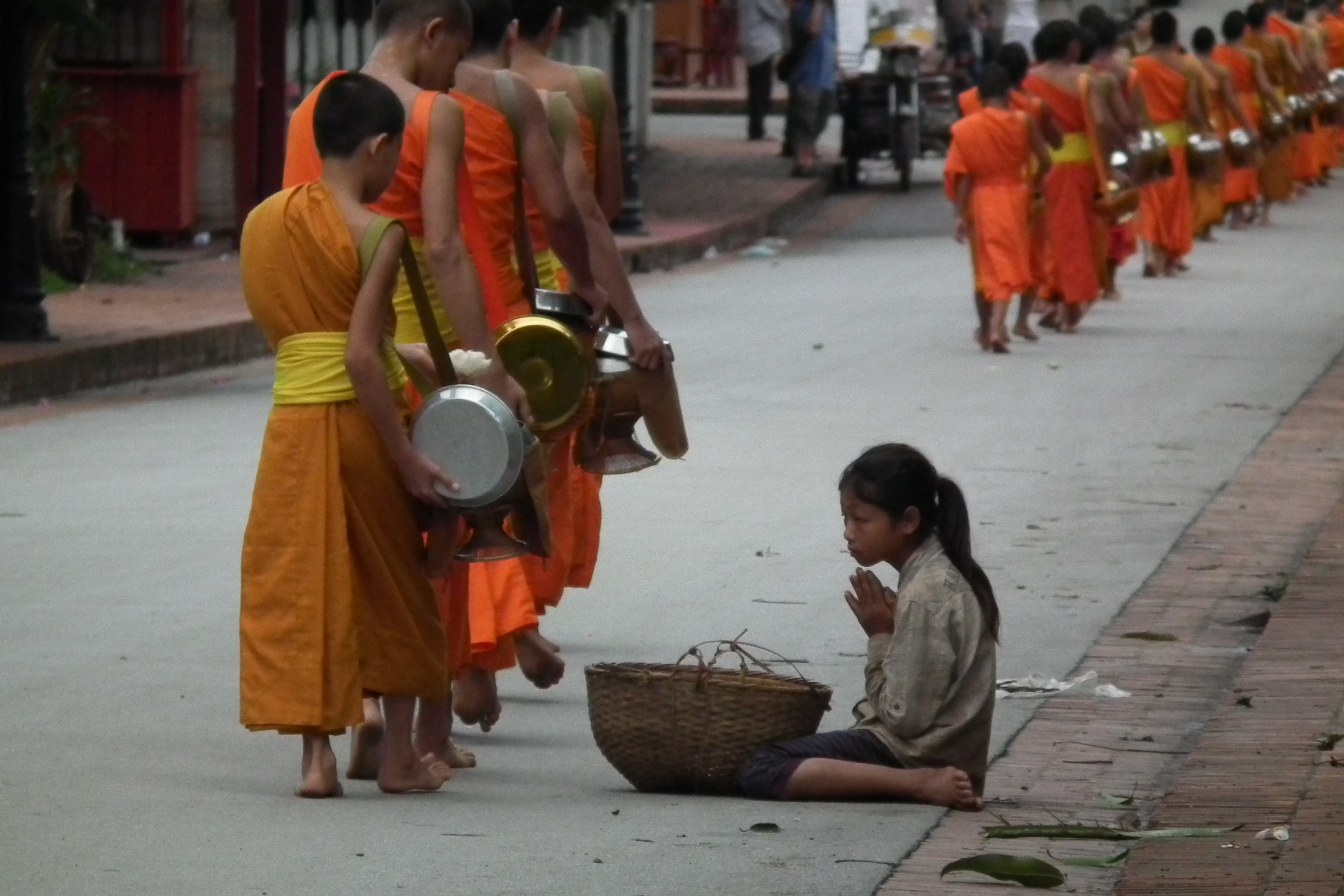
A young layperson providing monks with alms

The Buddhist code of monastic discipline details the code of behavior and livelihood for monks and nuns, including several details on how mendicancy is to be practiced. Traditionally, mendicants relied on what have been termed the "four requisites" for survival: food, clothing, lodging, and medicine. As stated in the Theravada Vinaya:

"Properly considering the robe, I use it: simply to ward off cold, to ward off heat, to ward off the touch of flies, mosquitoes, simply for the purpose of covering the parts of the body that cause shame.

"Properly considering almsfood, I use it: not playfully, nor for intoxication, nor for putting on weight, nor for beautification; but simply for the survival and continuance of this body, for ending its afflictions, for the support of the chaste life, (thinking) I will destroy old feelings (of hunger) and not create new feelings (from overeating). Thus I will maintain myself, be blameless, and live in comfort.

"Properly considering the lodging, I use it: simply to ward off cold, to prevent sunburn, to ward off the touch of flies, mosquitoes, wind, sun and reptiles; simply for protection from the inclemencies of weather and for the enjoyment of seclusion.

"Properly considering medicinal requisites for curing the sick, I use them: simply to ward off any pains of illness that have arisen and for the maximum freedom from disease."

In addition, a monk's personal property was also limited. The Theravada tradition recognizes eight requisites (Pali: aññha parikkhàra):

1. Uttarāsaṅga (outer robe)
2. Antarvāsa (inner robe)
3. Saṃghāti (double robe)
4. an alms bowl
5. a razor for shaving
6. a needle and thread
7. a belt
8. a water strainer

Commentarial literature provides additional possessions based on circumstance.

=== Japanese Buddhism ===
Similar to the development of Buddhism in China, the Japanese did not frequently engage in alms round as was done in the Buddha's time. Monasteries would receive donations of land that were worked by peasant farmers which provided regular communal meals for residing monks.

Nevertheless, piṇḍapāta is occasionally practiced in Japan, primarily within Zen Buddhism. Monks who engage in alms round tend to wear a bamboo hat, white leggings and straw sandals as traditionally worn by itinerant monks (行脚僧, angyasō). When going for alms in groups, the monks will form a line and wander through the town shouting the phrase hōu (法雨, 'rain of Dharma') to announce their presence.

== Islam ==
Among Muslims, especially in Northern Nigeria, there are mendicants called Almajiri who are mostly children between the age of 5 to 18 years that are studying Qur'an in cities while begging to get sustenance. In addition to almajiri, Northern Nigeria, which is a predominantly Muslim region, has many beggars that may not necessarily be Almajiri. This includes people with physical disabilities such as the blind and even aged destitutes.

== See also ==
Buddhist mendicancy

- Bhikkhu
- Samanera
- Dhutanga
- Hijiri (Buddhist)
- Kanjin

Christian mendicancy

- Mendicant orders
- Foolishness for Christ

Islamic mendicancy

- Almajiri
- Dervish
- Fakir

Hindu mendicancy

- Rishi
- Sadhu
- Sannyasa
- Yogi

General terminology

- Alms
- Asceticism
- Begging
- Cynicism (philosophy)
- Dāna
- Hermit
- Monasticism
- Open-air preaching
- Śramaṇa
