= Mount Grace House =

House in East Harlsey, North Yorkshire, England

Coordinates: 54°22′47″N 1°18′39″W

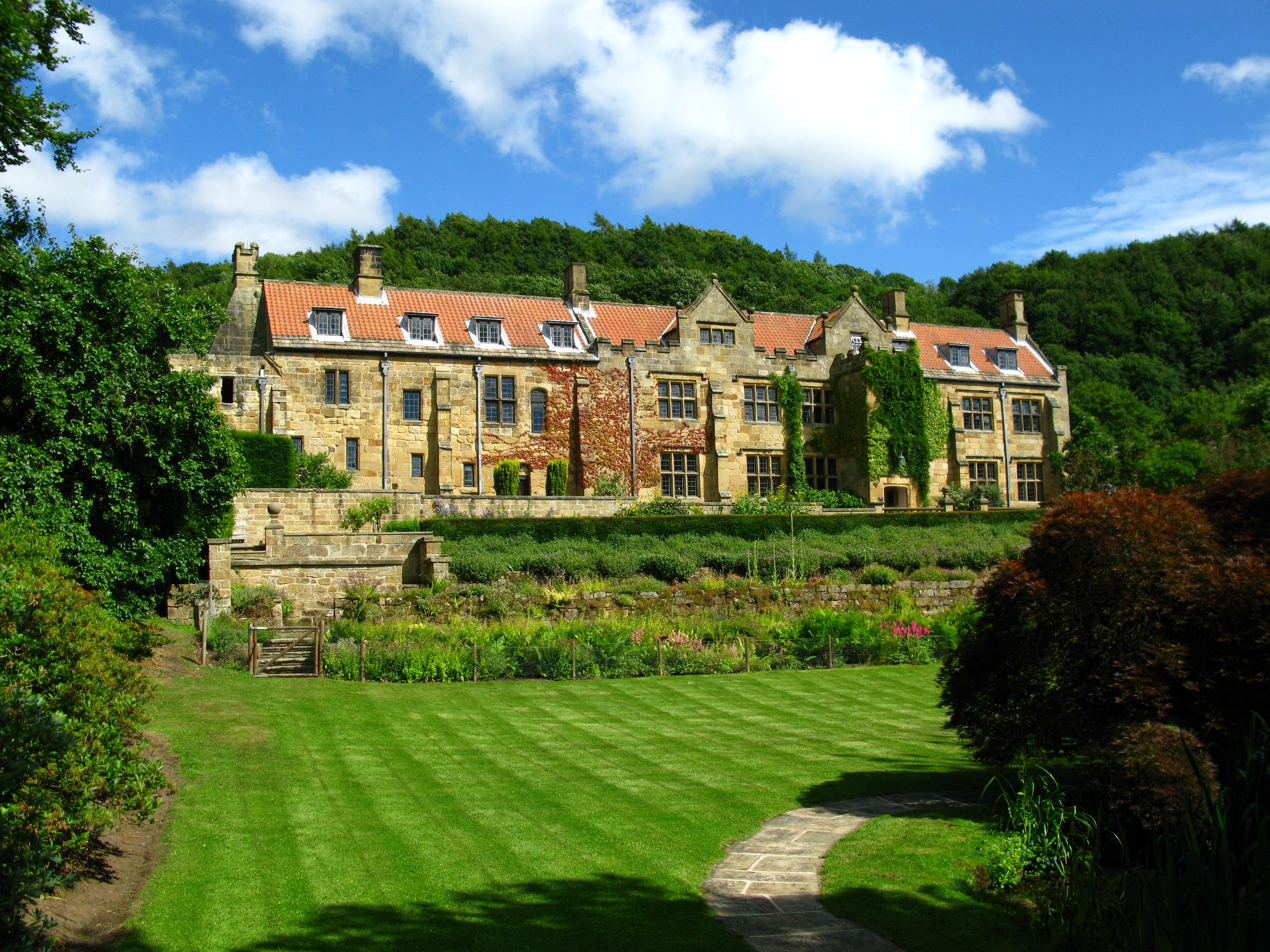
The building, in 2010

Mount Grace House is a historic building in East Harlsey, a village in North Yorkshire, in England.

The house was originally constructed as the gatehouse of Mount Grace Priory, a Carthusian religious house. It was a six-bay building, supported by buttresses. In 1653, Thomas Lascelles converted the building into a house, adding an east wing and west porch. He also replaced the windows and made major internal alterations, including adding a long gallery. In 1901, Lowthian Bell commissioned Ambrose Poynter to restore and extend the house, with most of the interiors decorated in the Arts and Crafts style. The house was grade II* listed in 1970, and is now owned by the National Trust.

The house is built of stone with a floor band, roofs of pantile and stone slate, two storeys and attics. To the left are two bays dating from he 15th century, and to the right are seven bays added in 1654. On the front is a full-height porch containing a doorway with a four-centred arched head, and an embattled parapet with ball finials. The porch and the bays to the left have mullioned and transomed windows, and two gabled dormers with ball finials flanked by embattled parapets. In the outer bays are windows with chamfered surrounds, and the attic contain 20th-century dormers.

== See also ==
- Grade II* listed buildings in North Yorkshire (district)
- Listed buildings in East Harlsey
