= Saxo =

Saxo may refer to:

- Citroën Saxo, automobile model
- Annalista Saxo, anonymous author of an imperial chronicle
- Poeta Saxo, anonymous Saxon poet
- Saxo Grammaticus (c. 1150–1220), Danish historian
- Saxo Bank, a Danish investment bank
  - Team Saxo Bank, a cycling team sponsored by Saxo Bank

== See also ==
- Conrad of Saxony, also called Conradus Saxo
