= Meditations on the Life of Christ =

Fourteenth-century devotional work by Nicholas Love

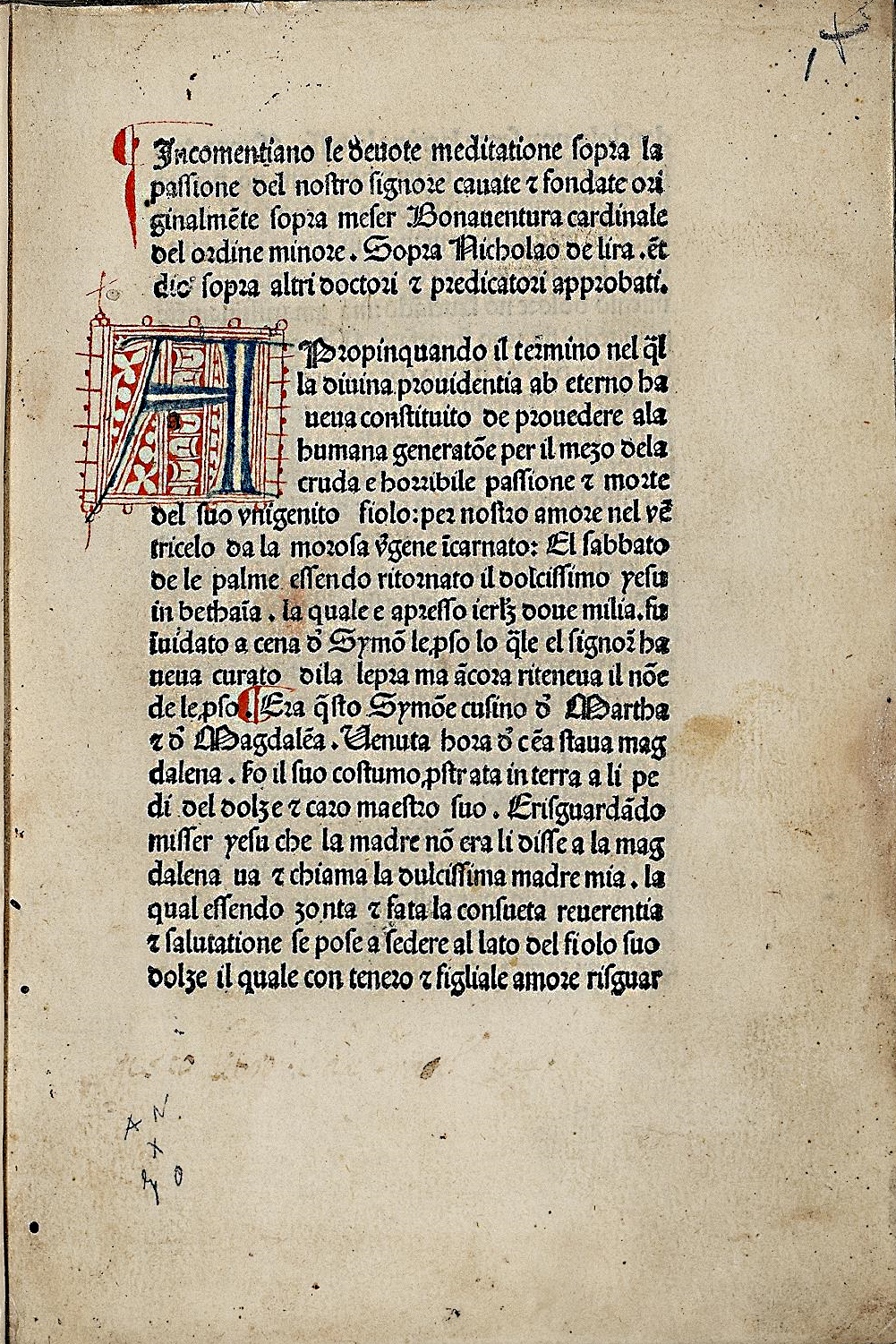
Meditationes uitae Christi (Giovanni de' Cauli?), ca. 1478

The Meditations on the Life of Christ (Latin: Meditationes Vitae Christi or Meditationes De Vita Christi; Italian Meditazione della vita di Cristo) is a fourteenth-century devotional work, later translated into Middle English by Nicholas Love as The Mirror of the Blessed Life of Jesus Christ.

== Authorship ==
The work's precise date of composition, and its author, has occasioned much debate. Until the late nineteenth century, it was traditionally ascribed to Bonaventure. Once it was realised that the work was not by him, the ascription was changed to pseudo-Bonaventure, and was judged to be of unknown Franciscan authorship.

The editor of the critical edition of the Latin Meditations associated it with a John of Caulibus (Latin: Johannes de Caulibus), an attribution also appearing in the work's most recent English translation. An argument has been made that the Latin work was written around 1300 by Jacobus de Sancto Geminiano, who is also identifiable as the leader of a revolt of Tuscan spirituals, one of the Fraticelli, in 1312. It has also been argued that the original version was composed in Italian, perhaps by an Italian nun of the order of Poor Clares.

== Influence ==
The work's popularity in the Middle Ages is evidenced by the survival of over two hundred manuscript copies, including seventeen illuminated ones. The popularity of the work increased further with early printed editions, with a surviving Venetian blockbook of 1497.

The work's detailed evocations of moments from the life of Christ and his mother may have influenced early Trecento art. It has also been credited with inspiring the great increase in depictions of the Veil of Veronica from the late 14th century.
