= Conrad of Saxony =

Conrad of Saxony, also called Conradus Saxo, Conrad of Brunswick or Conradus Holyinger, was a Friar Minor and ascetical writer.

== Biography ==
Date and place of birth uncertain. Holyinger is perhaps his family name. The error has been made by some of confounding Conrad of Saxony with another person of the same name who suffered for the Catholic faith in 1284, whereas it is certain that they were two distinct individuals, though belonging to the same province of the order in Germany.

Conrad became provincial minister of the province of Saxony in 1245, a position he held for sixteen years. While on his way to the general chapter of 1279, he became seriously ill and died at Bologna in 1279.

== Works ==
The writings of Conrad of Saxony include several sermons and the "Speculum Beatæ Mariæ Virginis"; the latter, at times erroneously attributed to Bonaventure, was edited by the Friars Minor at Quaracchi in 1904. The preface to this excellent edition of the "Speculum" contains a brief sketch of the life of Conrad of Saxony and a critical estimate of his other writings.
