= Listed buildings in East Harlsey =

East Harlsey is a civil parish in the county of North Yorkshire, England. It contains nine listed buildings that are recorded in the National Heritage List for England. Of these, one is listed at Grade I, the highest of the three grades, two are at Grade II*, the middle grade, and the others are at Grade II, the lowest grade. The parish contains the village of East Harlsey and the surrounding area. The most important building in the parish is the ruined Mount Grace Priory, which is listed, together with associated structures. The other listed buildings are a church, houses, and a dovecote.

== Key ==
Grade	Criteria
I	Buildings of exceptional interest, sometimes considered to be internationally important
II*	Particularly important buildings of more than special interest
II	Buildings of national importance and special interest

== Buildings ==
Name and location	Photograph	Date	Notes	Grade
St Oswald's Church; 54.39143°N 1.34520°W		12th century	The church has been altered and extended through the centuries, it was much rebuilt in the 17th century, and restored in 1885. It is in stone with slate roofs, and consists of a nave, a north aisle, a south porch, and a chancel with a north aisle. At the west end is a double bellcote with rusticated stonework, four-centred arched bell openings, a moulded cornice, and a pyramidal gable surmounted and flanked by squat obelisks. The porch has a coped gable with three ball finials, and contains a four-centred arched opening with a chamfered surround.	II*
Mount Grace Priory; 54.37998°N 1.31011°W		1398	The ruined remains of a Carthusian priory are in stone, and consist of the great cloister to the north, the church, and the remains of the lay brothers' quarters to the south. The church has a nave, north and south transepts, a chancel, and a tower at the crossing. The tower has two stages, diagonal buttresses, tall bell openings with pointed arches, a moulded eaves band, and an embattled parapet with the remains of pinnacles. The courtyard wall contains the remains of monks' cells, each with a four-centred arched head, and a right-angled food opening on the side.	I
Mount Grace House; 54.37983°N 1.31093°W		15th century	The gatehouse to Mount Grace Priory, later extended and converted into a house. It is in stone with a floor band, roofs of pantile and stone slate, two storeys and attics. To the left are two bays dating from he 15th century, and to the right are seven bays added in 1654. On the front is a full-height porch containing a doorway with a four-centred arched head, and an embattled parapet with ball finials. The porch and the bays to the left have mullioned and transomed windows, and two gabled dormers with ball finials flanked by embattled parapets. In the outer bays are windows with chamfered surrounds, and the attic contain 20th-century dormers.	II*
Priory View; 54.39196°N 1.34910°W		1611	The house is rendered, with stone dressings, on a plinth, with rusticated quoins, six full-height pilasters with moulded capitals, a moulded eaves cornice, a frieze, and a pantile roof with stone copings and shaped kneelers. The doorway has a plain surround, and a large moulded eared lintel with geometric patterns, and a central dated keystone, and the windows are casements.	II
Mount Grace Lady Chapel and House; 54.37705°N 1.30226°W		Early 18th century	The chapel was mostly rebuilt in the 20th century, and the attached house dates from the mid 19th century. The chapel is in stone on a deep moulded plinth, and has a stone slate roof. There are two bays, a doorway with a chamfered surround, a four-centred arched head and a hood mould, and the windows are in Perpendicular style. The house is in stone with a pantile roof and stone coping, one storey and attics, and two bays. The windows are mullioned with hood moulds, and in the attic are two two-light raking dormers.	II
Dovecote; 54.39179°N 1.34579°W		Early 18th century	The dovecote is in red brick, with raised brick quoins, stepped floor bands, a stepped and dentilled eaves band, and a pyramidal Welsh slate roof. There are three storeys. On the south side is a doorway with a square opening to its side. Elsewhere, there are blind oval openings with four keystones.	II
Coulson Villa; 54.39263°N 1.34631°W	—	Late 18th century	The house is rendered, with an eaves band, and a pantile roof with stone coping and shaped kneelers. There are two storeys and three bays. On the front is a doorway and sash windows.	II
The Vicarage; 54.39162°N 1.34901°W	—	Late 18th century	The vicarage is rendered, with an eaves cornice, and a pantile roof with stone coping and shaped kneelers. There are two storeys and five bays, the outer bays lower. The central Doric doorway has reeded pilasters, a fanlight, a frieze with paterae, and a cornice, and is flanked by canted bay windows. Elsewhere, there is one horizontally-sliding sash window, and the others are sashes with flat stucco arches and voussoirs.	II
Staddle Bridge House; 54.38378°N 1.31982°W	—	Early 19th century	The house, which incorporates earlier material, is in stone, and has a Welsh slate roof, hipped on the left, and with stone coping and a shaped kneeler on the right. There are two storeys and three bays. The central doorway has a plain surround, a four-centred arched head, and a fanlight. The windows on the front are sashes, and in the left return are openings with chamfered surrounds.	II
