= St Oswald's Church, East Harlsey =

Church in East Harlsey, North Yorkshire, England

Coordinates: 54.3914°N 1.3452°W

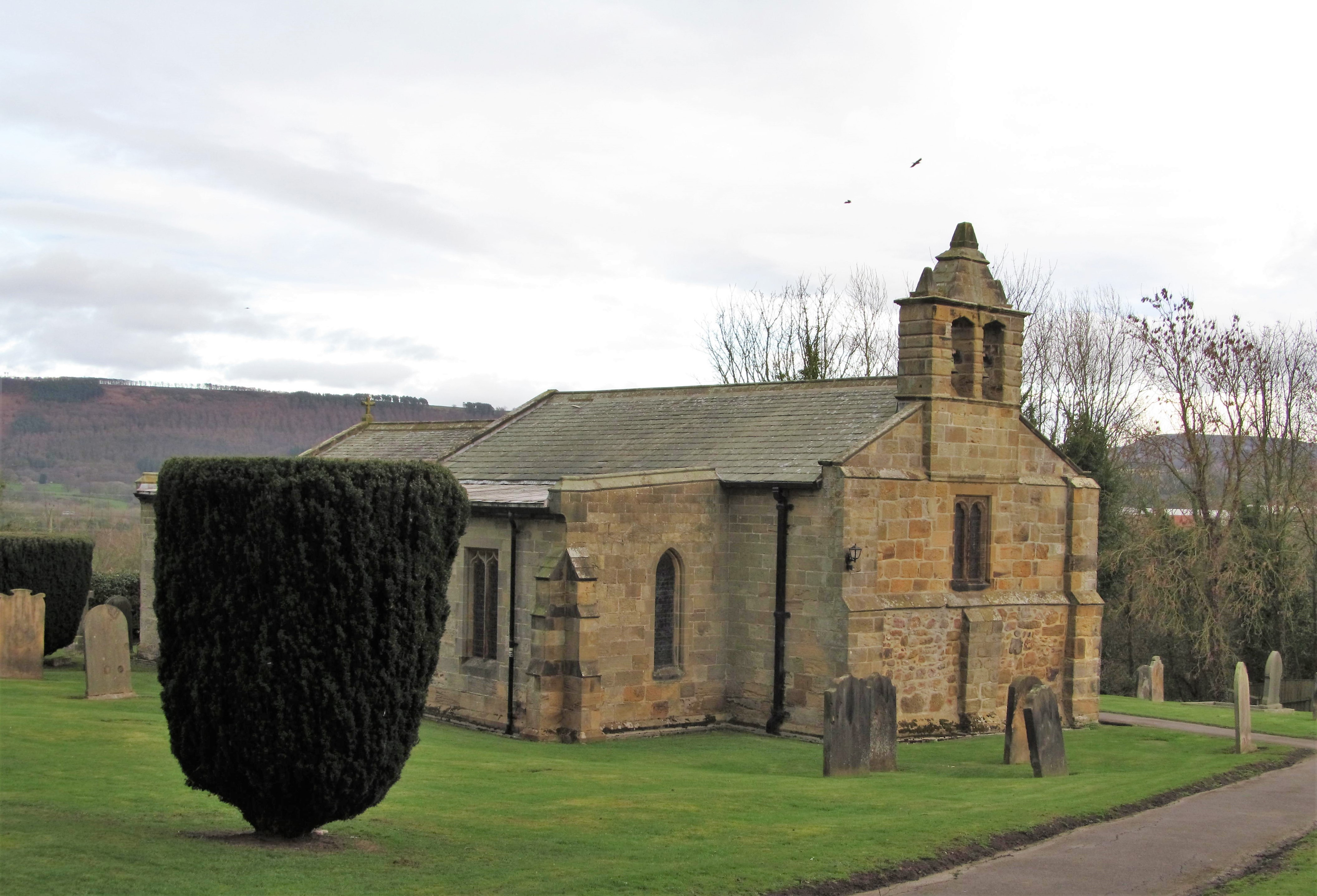
The church, in 2019

St Oswald's Church is an Anglican church in East Harlsey, a village in North Yorkshire.

A church was built on the site in the 12th century, from which period some of the walls survive, and there is a 15th-century window in the south wall of the chancel. It was altered in the 17th century, and the south porch and bellcote are of this date. The church was largely rebuilt in 1885 by Austin, Johnson and Hicks. It was grade II* listed in 1970.

The church is built of stone with slate roofs, and consists of a nave, a north aisle, a south porch, and a chancel with a north aisle. At the west end is a double bellcote with rusticated stonework, four-centred arched bell openings, a moulded cornice, and a pyramidal gable surmounted and flanked by squat obelisks. The porch has a coped gable with three ball finials, and contains a four-centred arched opening with a chamfered surround. Inside, there is an effigy of a knight dating from the 1320s and an 18th-century monument of carved marble.

== See also ==
- Grade II* listed churches in North Yorkshire (district)
- Listed buildings in East Harlsey
