= Collationes in Hexaemeron =

1273 lecture series by St. Bonaventure

The Collationes in Hexaemeron (Latin: [kɔllatsiɔnɛs in ɛksɛmɛɾɔn], Talks on the Six Days [of Creation]) are an unfinished series of theological lectures given by St. Bonaventure in Paris between Easter and Pentecost 1273.

They exist only in listeners' transcripts (reportationes) handed down both in a shorter version (Reportatio A) and a longer, significantly different (Reportatio B).

== Origin and history ==
Information on the circumstances of the presentation and the creation of his text, the author provides the shorter Reportatio A in an addition of the text of the only surviving manuscript of this Reportatio, which is kept today in Siena and 1934 by F. Delorme, was published.

After these lectures: 1273 time between Easter (9 April) and Pentecost (May 28) in Paris have been before an audience of nearly 160 listeners, consisting of a few masters and young monks. The original seven, each more comprehensive and Collationes as Visio, (transl. Contributions as Vision) titled parts of the plant after the fourth Visio, would then transport the author's account of the higher (Bonaventure's elevation to cardinal on May 28, 1273) and because of his death (July 15, 1274) no longer come to the lecture.

The Reportatio does not mention his own name and cites Bonaventura only as the "lord and master of this work" (Latin: dominus et magister huius operis) and indicates that his transcript is "from the mouth of the speaker" (Latin: ab ore loquentis). He had written off and two other companions had written transcripts, which were, however, "because of their great confusion and illegibility" no one other than this fellow's proved useful.

The copy of its own transcript was corrected, however, counter-checked by other listeners and Bonaventure both itself and by others has been written off. This version of the A Reportatio not based on this first, by Bonaventura accepted as a model specimen, but on a book of anonymous for some time thereafter received the Order of Alemannia Provincial Superior, a Brother Konrad, and then from memory again revised, without, as he affirmed, adding its own, unless extensions in the designs of the logic of Aristotle, and evidence of the localities cited authorities.

The longer version is also decreasing B to a transcript of listeners, whose mode of origin is not known well, and independently by the outcome of investigations by Delorme originated from the shorter Reportatio A. For the longer version now 10 manuscripts are known, one of them (D Sigle, Royal Library Königsberg, Cod 1200,) from the late 13th or early 14th century has been lost today, could but in 1875 there are still depreciated by Fedele Fanna.

One of these ten manuscripts, Codex 31 of the University Library of Munich (M Sigle, late 15th century), is merely a copy of the first printed edition of the work, published in 1495 Strasbourg, and in turn on an opposite the older manuscripts are supplements advanced text based. She did the work under the title Luminaria Ecclesiae known and turn served as a template for other expenses and for up to the 19th century edition of the authoritative work of Sistine Chapel Clementina (about 1588).

The first and still only critical edition of Reportatio B was in 1891 by the Fathers of the College of St. Bonaventure in Quaracchi in Volume V of the Opera omnia submitted. It refers to the text of the manuscript M and the Strasbourg pressure because of their low quality and also because of their strong Reportatio A textual differences do not in the critical establishment of the text and is based instead on a collation of seven of the remaining nine manuscripts known today.

Only recently two more manuscripts were rediscovered, which are not yet considered by this critical issue: a manuscript of the late 15th century, 1984 discovered by JG Bougerol in Tours (Sigle T Bibliothèque municipale de Tours, 409), and possibly the oldest of all surviving manuscripts, the so-called Assisi manuscript. This manuscript was an important copy of other works of Bonaventura, performed in 1380 by Giovanni da Iolo in its inventory of Biblioteca del Sacro Convento in Assisi, of B. Bonelli in the 18th century and described the outgoing end of the 13th century dates, was lost in the aftermath, however, and could only be Guilbert 1984 by Ouy in Leningrad (now Saint Petersburg) rediscovered (National Library of Saint Petersburg, Lat. Qv. I.219) . An excerpt from the text of this manuscript was published in 1993 by P. Maranesi with the variations of all other manuscripts. A new critical edition of Reportatio B remains a desideratum of research.

== Contents ==
The Collationes provide a representation of central themes of theology and his view of Bonaventure's position on philosophy. In essence, it is a theological introduction to Christianity, the Order and the Church. Form and content to make them smaller and larger works, such as in De reductione Artium ad theologiam (Reduction of the Arts to Theology), Itinerarium mentis in Deum (The Mind's Road to God), and Lignum vitae (The Tree of Life), and appear as the final sum of his theological thinking.

In Collationes is about the vision of God in the Creation. In addition, they suggest the creation story of Christ and his Church. In the intellectual argument, they seek a synthesis of faith and reason. Philosophical and scientific knowledge of that time to support the argument.

The Collationes are highly structured. They orient themselves formally to the days of creation. Each day of creation corresponds to a vision. This vision can be understood as a perception, perspective or view. The concept is differentiated in the Collationes itself.

The 23 Collationes divided into a preface (I-III), in a treatise on the First Vision (IV-VII), on the second vision (VIII-XII), on the third (XIII-XIX) and fourth (XX - XXIII). They are supplemented by an Additamentum (appendix). Each collatio is first introduced with a quote for each day of creation, often followed by a summary of the previous collatio.

From collatio III .24 to 31 shows: The six days of creation according to the vision of God on six visions facing. The seventh day of rest corresponds to the eternal vision of God as the seventh vision after death. The eighth day as the return of the first is interpreted as a resurrection. Four visions are executed at the factory, the last three are named in the notes again as a theme.

The visions are assigned topics. The first vision is about understanding and virtue, the second vision of faith, the third vision is about the Bible and the fourth vision of the church.

The author ranks the value of various sources of knowledge about God:

1. The Bible as Holy Scripture
2. The writings of the saints
3. The Church Fathers
4. The pagan philosophers
5. The creation, but only with the help of the Bible.

In interpreting the Bible, following Jerome and Augustine, it presupposes a knowledge necessary for it. Accordingly, he rejects a literal interpretation of the Bible from a large extent. The literal sense (sensus litteralis) he is the spiritual interpretation to three (triplex intelligentia spiritualis), for which he sees great opportunities. In the biblical texts are widely understood as images and symbols of Christ, the Trinity and the Church's life. Depending on the assignment to the areas is an allegory, anagogy or tropology. The allegory is about Christ, the anagogy from heaven, tropology of church life. How to use the spiritual interpretation is made clear in the book the example of the interpretation of the sun symbol.

In addition, the author explains the principle of theological speculation, which is derived from the Latin word speculum (mirror). Accordingly, reflected in the reason the divine reason, in microcosm, the soul of the macrocosm of creation, in the Old Testament, the New Testament, according to the principle of promise and fulfillment in the Church and the Heavenly Jerusalem.

The Collationes are philosophically in the Neoplatonically-Christian tradition of Dionysius and St. Augustine and are highly critical of Aristotle. Notwithstanding the criticism of his God and the doctrine of creation, followed by the Collationes Aristotle's ethics and virtue theory in terms of measure and center (VI, 12).

== Critical text editions ==
- 'Reportatio A' (short version):
  - Marie Ferdinand Delorme:P. Bonaventura Collationes in Hexaemeron et Bonaventuriana selecta quaedam. Quaracchi 1934 (= Bibliotheca Franciscana Scholastica Medii Aevi, 8).
- 'Reportatio B' (long version):
  - Doctoris Seraphici S. Bonaventura SRE Episcopi Cardinalis opera omnia, iussu et auctoritate Rmi. P. Bernardini a Portu Romatino (..) studio et cura PP Collegii a S. Bonaventura ad plurimos codices mss. emendata anecdotis aucta prolegomenis scholiis notisque illustrata, Vol V: Opuscula varia theologica. Quaracchi 1891, Sp 329-449
  - Pietro Maranesi: Bonaventure of Bagnoregio: A transcription of the third collation of the Hexaemeron from the St. Petersburg manuscript. In: Franciscan Studies 53 (1993), p. 47-78

== Translations ==
- Bonventura Sanctus: The six-day work. Latin and German.Translated and introduced by William Nyssen, Kösel, Munich 1964, 2nd Edition 1979, 3-466-20016-4. - The Latin text is taken from the B Output Quaracchi 1891, with additions in brackets from A to Delorme 1934
- Obras San Buenaventura, Volume III:Colaciones Hexaemeron o sobre el de la Iglesia Iluminaciones (among others). Ed, with introduction and notes by León Amorós, Miguel and Bernardo Aperribai Oromi, 2 Ed, La Católica editorial, Madrid 1957, p. 176-659 (Latin text B after issuance Quaracchi 1891, with Spanish translation)
- Saint Bonaventure: Les six jours de la création. Translation, introduction and notes by Marc Ozilou, foreword by Olivier Boulnois, Desclée / Cerf, Paris 1991, ISBN 2-7189-0549-2
- Opere di San Bonaventura: Latino-edizione italiana, Vol VI.1: Opere teologiche. Translation of Pietro Maranesi, introduction and notes by Bernardo de Amellada, Città Nuova Editrice, Rome 1994, ISBN 88-311-9427-5

== Literature ==
- Joseph Ratzinger: The Theology of History in St. Bonaventure. EOS Verlag, St. Ottilie, 1992. ISBN 3-88096-081-X
- Ruedi Imbach: Bonaventura: Collationes in Hexaemeron. In: Kurt Flasch (ed.):major works of philosophy, the Middle Ages. Interpretations.Reclam-Verlag, Stuttgart, 1998 (= RUB 8741), ISBN 3-15-008741-4, pp 270–291
