= Giacomo Todeschini =

Italian historian, medievalist

- Born: 1 October 1950 (age 76); Milan, Italy
- Occupation: Historian

Academic background
- Education: University of Bologna

Academic work
- Discipline: Historian, medievalist
- Institutions: University of Trieste

Giacomo Todeschini (born October 1, 1950) is an Italian historian, medievalist, specialized in history of economic thought.

== Life ==
After pursuing studies at the University of Bologna, Giacomo Todeschini was appointed professor of medieval history at the University of Trieste in 1979, retiring from that position in 2016. He has been a visiting professor at the École Normale Supérieure (Paris, 2001), fellow at the Oxford Centre for Hebrew and Jewish Studies (Oxford, 2004–2005), fellow at the Institute for Advanced Study (Princeton, 2007–2008), visiting professor at the History Department of Peking University (Beijing, 2012), fellow at the Wissenschaftskolleg zu Berlin (Berlin, 2016–2017).

== Work ==
Giacomo Todeschini's work is focused on the development of medieval economic thought and languages, Christian doctrine of infamy and exclusion from citizenship and market games, and the political role of Jews and Judaism inside of the Christian medieval-modern world. He is known, among other things, for his work on Peter John Olivi, and for his study of the myth of usury.

== Bibliography ==
- Un trattato francescano di economia politica: il De emptionibus et venditionibus, De usuris, De restitutionibus di Pietro di Giovanni Olivi. Rome: Istituto Storico Italiano per il Medioevo. 1980.
- La ricchezza degli ebrei. Merci e denaro nella riflessione ebraica e nella definizione cristiana dell'usura alla fine del Medioevo. Spoleto: Centro Italiano di Studi sull’Alto Medioevo. 1989. ISBN 9788879881647.
- Il prezzo della salvezza. Lessici medievali del pensiero economico. Rome: La Nuova Italia Scientifica. 1994. ISBN 9788843001750.
- I mercanti e il tempio. La società cristiana e il circolo virtuoso della ricchezza fra medioevo ed età moderna. Bologna: Il Mulino. 2002. ISBN 9788815087409.
- Ricchezza francescana. Dalla povertà volontaria alla società di mercato. Bologna: Il Mulino. 2004. ISBN 9788815387936.
- Visibilmente crudeli. Malviventi, persone sospette e gente qualunque dal medioevo all'età moderna. Bologna: Il Mulino. 2007. ISBN 9788815119308.
- Come Giuda. La gente comune e i giochi dell'economia all'inizio dell'epoca moderna. Bologna: Il Mulino. 2011. ISBN 9788815150479.
- La banca e il ghetto. Una storia italiana. Roma: Laterza. 2016. ISBN 9788858122167.
- Storia degli ebrei nell'Italia medievale. Roma: Carocci. 2018. ISBN 9788843090808.
- Come l'acqua e il sangue. Le origini medievali del pensiero economico. Roma: Carocci. 2021. ISBN 9788829005000.
