= Giovanni de' Cauli =

Giovanni de' Cauli (Latin: Johannes de Caulibus) was a Franciscan preacher and writer from Tuscany active in the 14th century.

The intercession of the angels, from the opening page of a Milanese copy of the Meditations from c. 1450

According to Bartolomeo da Pisa's Liber conformitatum (1385), Giovanni was a native of San Gimignano and resided in the convent of Saint Francis there. The family name Cauli is attested in both Florence and Pisa and Giovanni's family probably hailed from the latter. His eponymous uncle was one of the earliest disciples of Francis of Assisi and lived to an advanced age.

Bartolomeo praises Giovanni for writing tractatus meditationis super evangelia (treatise of meditation on the gospels), which has generally been taken to refer to the Meditations on the Life of Christ, a work often misakenly attributed to Bonaventure. The chroniclers Mariano da Firenze, Pietro Ridolfi and Francesco Gonzaga, who all record Giovanni as a fine preacher, accepted his authorship. It is uncertain if the Meditations was originally written in Latin or Italian. Internal evidence favouring Giovanni's authorship is found in several references to San Gimignano, such as the comparison of the distance between Golgotha and the gate of Jerusalem to that between the convent of Saint Francis and the Porta San Giovanni. If Giovanni was indeed the author of the Meditations, a few biographical details emerge. He had visited the Archbasilica of Saint John Lateran in Rome. He addressed a "beloved daughter", which has led to the conclusion that he was the spiritual director and confessor of the house of the Poor Clares in San Gimignano.

== Bibliography ==
- Arosio, Marco (2000). "Giovanni de' Cauli". Dizionario Biografico degli Italiani (in Italian). Vol. 55: Ginammi–Giovanni da Crema. Rome: Istituto dell'Enciclopedia Italiana. ISBN 978-88-12-00032-6.
- McNamer, Sarah (1999). "Review of Stallings-Taney 1997". The Journal of Theological Studies. New. 50 (1): 378–385. JSTOR 23967948.
- Stallings-Taney, C. Mary, ed. (1997). Iohannis de Caulibus: Meditaciones Vite Christi. Corpus Christianorum Continuatio Mediaevalis. Vol. 153. Brepols.
- Taney, Francis X.; Miller, Anne; Stallings-Taney, C. Mary, eds. (2000). Meditations on the Life of Christ. Pegasus Press.
