= Mount Grace Priory =

Carthusian house in North Yorkshire, England

House of Mount Grace of Ingelby
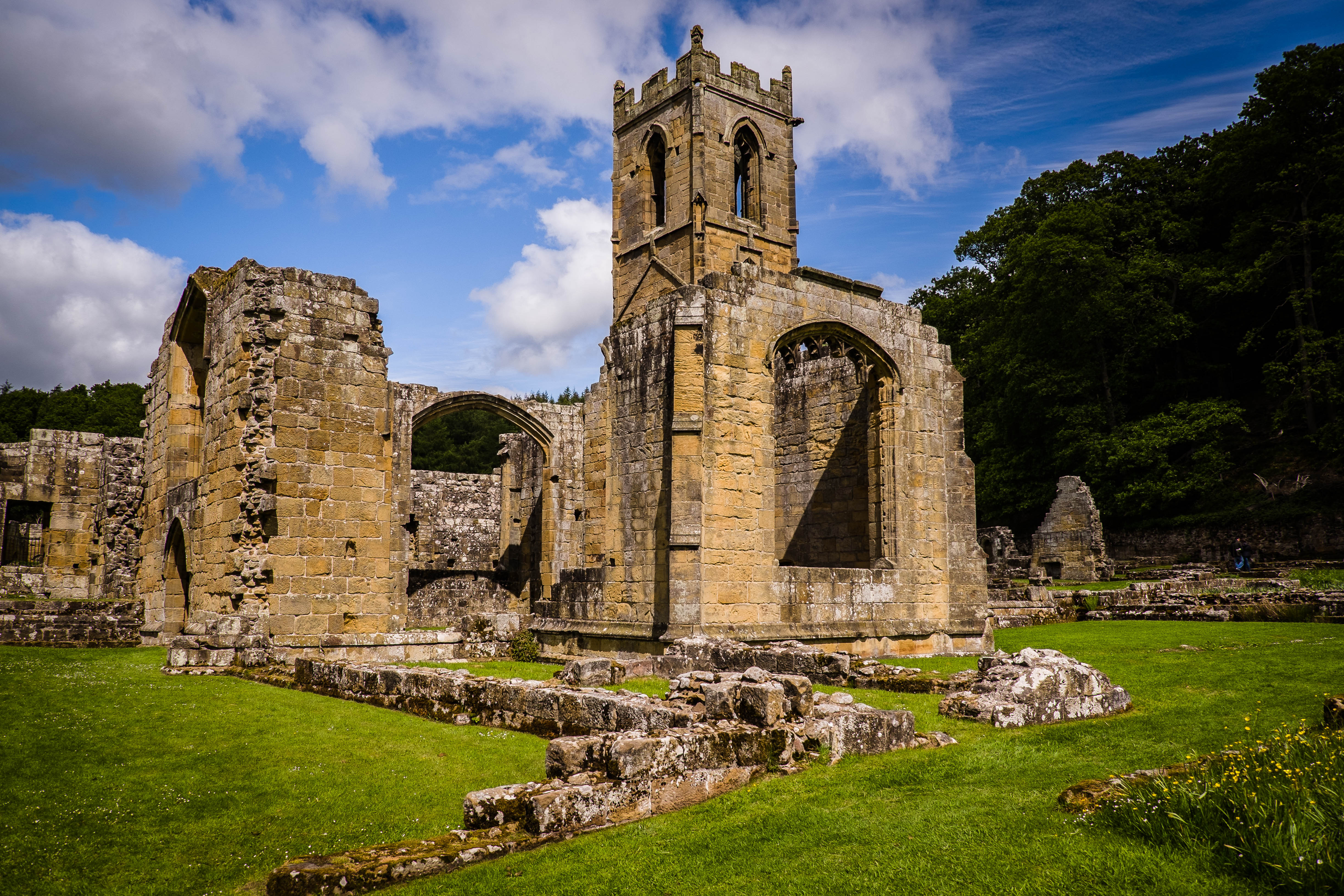
- Mount Grace Priory
- Interactive map of House of Mount Grace of Ingelby

Monastery information
- Order: Carthusian
- Established: 1398
- Disestablished: 1539
- Dedication: House of the Assumption of the Blessed Virgin and of St Nicholas
- Diocese: York

People
- Founders: Thomas de Holand, Earl of Kent and Duke of Surrey

Site
- Location: East Harlsey, North Yorkshire, England
- Coordinates: 54.380120°N 1.311077°W
- Grid reference: SE449985
- Visible remains: church, cloister, inner court and earthworks
- Public access: yes (English Heritage)

Mount Grace Priory is a monastery in the parish of East Harlsey, North Yorkshire, England. Set in woodlands within the North York Moors National Park, it is represented today by the best preserved and most accessible ruins among the nine houses of the Carthusian Order, which existed in England in the Middle Ages and were known as charterhouses.

== History ==
The Mount Grace Charterhouse was founded in 1398 by Thomas Holland, 1st Duke of Surrey, the son of King Richard II's half-brother Thomas, Earl of Kent. It was the last monastery established in Yorkshire, and one of the few founded anywhere in Britain in the period between the Black Death (1349–50) and the Reformation. It was a fairly small establishment, with space for a prior and a total of twenty-three monks.

The monastery consisted of a church and two cloisters. The Great Cloister, to the north of the church, had seventeen cells for monks ("choir monks") whilst the southern Lesser Cloister had six cells for the lay brothers.

Following the abdication and eventual murder of King Richard II, Holland and others of the king's supporters attempted to assassinate his recently crowned successor, Henry IV, at New Year, 1400, but were captured and executed. Holland's body was eventually recovered and, in 1412, re-buried in the charterhouse that he had founded. Deprived of its founder and bereft of the income that had been granted to it by Holland and King Richard, Mount Grace was obliged to depend upon royal largesse for its income for more than a decade.

Coat of arms of Mount Grace priory

== Carthusian Priory ==
On its founding, Thomas Holland stipulated that the monks were to pray for the king, queen and several members of the royal family, and for himself and his heirs, and many others including John and Eleanor Ingelby. The prior of the Grande Chartreuse allowed him to nominate Robert Tredwye as the first rector (although the charter refers to him as the first prior) and to dedicate the priory to "the Blessed Virgin and Saint Nicholas". He is attested in a medieval charter, created between 18 February and 20 April 1398, now held in the collection at Ripley Castle in Yorkshire. The charter brings the Priory into existence and calls for prayers to be said for King Richard II, members of the Duke of Surrey's family, and John and Ellen de Ingelby, and for masses to be said for various people including Thomas de Ingelby and Katherine his wife. The second part of the dedication lapsed and the priory became known as the House of the Assumption of the most Blessed Virgin in Mount Grace.

Nicholas Love, prior of Mount Grace, succeeded in creating a link between the priory and the Lancastrian administration, in part by submitting his "Mirror of the Blessed Life of Jesus Christ" to Thomas Arundel, archbishop of Canterbury, Henry IV's chancellor, in support of the archbishop's campaign against Wycliffism, and by granting Arundel confraternity in the spiritual benefits of Mount Grace in exchange for his provision of material benefits. In 1410 the house was formally incorporated into the order, and Love named as fourth rector and first prior. (But note the disparity with the original charter.)

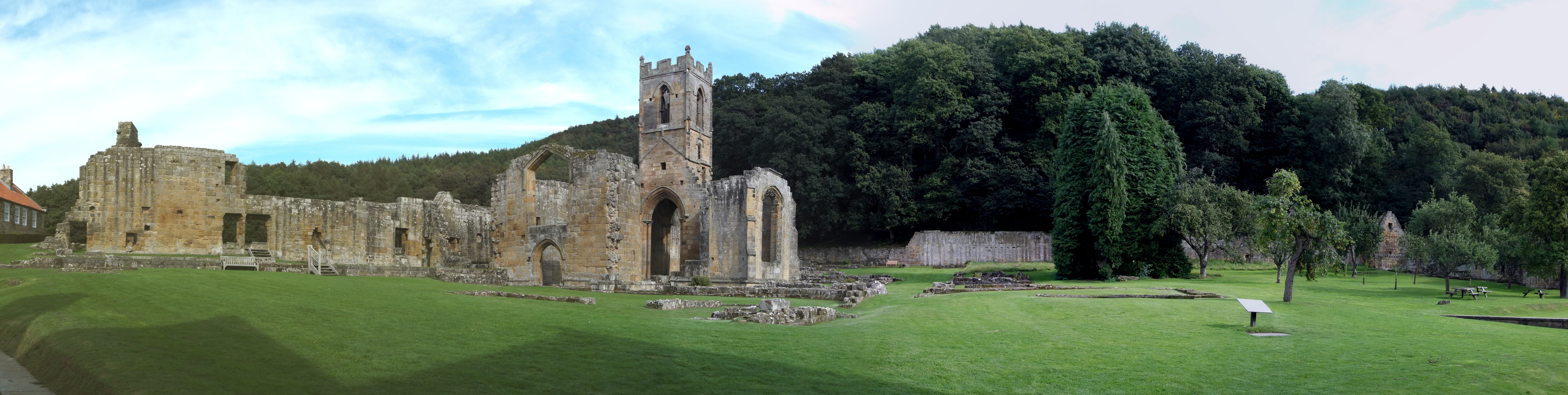
The priory from the south-west

The house received a number of grants and charters:

- In March 1399 Richard II granted the monks a charter of liberties and franchises in general terms, including the right to mine lead.
- In May 1399, at the request of the Duke of Surrey, he gave them the alien priories of Hinckley in Leicestershire, Carisbrooke in the Isle of Wight, and Wareham in Dorset. They were also given, for as long as England and France were at war, lands belonging to the alien priory of Saint Mary of Lire, at Evreux, in Normandy.
- When Wareham Priory was lost, soon after Henry's accession, the king granted the monks £100 a year from the Exchequer until they were able to get lands of equivalent value (£1,000) and a barrel of the 'better red wine of Gascony' to be received at Hull every Martinmas.
- In 1412 Henry V confirmed the gift of Hinckley to support five monks, to pray for himself and Thomas Beaufort, Earl of Dorset.
- In 1421 he gave the monks four further alien priories, Long Bennington, Minting and Hagh (Hough-on-the-Hill) in Lincolnshire, and Field Dalling in Norfolk, which redeemed the yearly grant of £100.

In 1439 the Priory asked parliament to confirm their title – the number of claimants to the estate meant that they dared not continue to build – and Henry VI did so in 1440. Following this, the gifts and income continued:

- In 1456 Sir James and Lady Elizabeth Strangways of Harlsey Castle granted the priory the advowson of the church of Beighton, in Derbyshire.
- In 1462 the king granted the manor of Atherstone, Warwickshire (part of the alien priory of Great Ogbourne in Wiltshire), for the relief of the poor.
- In 1471 the king granted the Yorkshire manor of the alien priory of Begare in return for three daily masses being said for the king and the souls of his family (a practice known as frankalmoign) but in 1472 it was re-granted to Eton College, who had been previous holders of a grant.
- In 1508 the Prior of Mount Grace leased the chapel of East Harlsey and manor of Bordelby to the Prior of Guisborough for fifty years of at a yearly rent of £8.
- In 1522, in the will of Sir Thomas Strangways, a Lady Chapel at Mount Grace is mentioned and directions given for the priest who sang masses there.

== Writings ==
Mount Grace became an important locus for the production and preservation of contemplative and devotional texts: among writers professed as monks there were John Norton and Richard Methley (the latter known for his Latin translations of The Cloud of Unknowing and of the anonymous English translation of Marguerite Porete's Mirror of Simple Souls). The only surviving manuscript of The Book of Margery Kempe also belonged to Mount Grace Charterhouse.

== Dissolution ==
The priory was closed in 1539 during the dissolution of the monasteries by Henry VIII. Some of the monks had (in 1534) attempted to avoid taking the oath of supremacy but, after they were imprisoned, the last prior, John Wilson, handed the keys over to Henry VIII's representatives. The site then passed into private ownership.

Mount Grace was valued at £382 5s. 11½d. gross (£323 2s. 10½d. net) which included £104 6s. 8d. from spiritualities in Lincolnshire, £164 from lands outside Yorkshire and the rest from its home county of Yorkshire. In December 1539 the brothers were awarded pensions totalling £195 – £60 plus the house and chapel called the Mount for the prior, £7 for each of eight priests and small sums for eighteen.

The dissolution of Mount Grace, and life in the priory in the preceding years, is vividly reimagined by Lucy Beckett in her 1986 novel The Time Before You Die.

== Daily life ==
Unlike monks of other orders, who live in common, the Carthusians—to this day—live as hermits, each occupying his own cell (more like a small house), and coming together only for the nocturnal liturgical hours, and on Sundays and feast-days, in the church; the other hours are sung by each monk separately in his cell. Except for the singing of the liturgy and conversation "on grave subjects" during a weekly three-hour exercise walk, Carthusians are silent, and their diet is strictly vegetarian.

The monks at Mount Grace were very conscious of hygiene and sanitation; included in the reconstructed cell is a reconstructed latrine and visitors are able to investigate the ditches used as sewage systems.

== Post-dissolution ==
After the dissolution, the ruins of the guest-house of the priory were incorporated into Mount Grace House: a seventeenth-century manor—a rare building of the Commonwealth period— built by Thomas Lascelles, later converted into an important example of the Arts and Crafts movement. The Manor House at the priory was decorated in Arts and Crafts style under the ownership of the ironmaster Sir Isaac Lowthian Bell.

== Present day ==
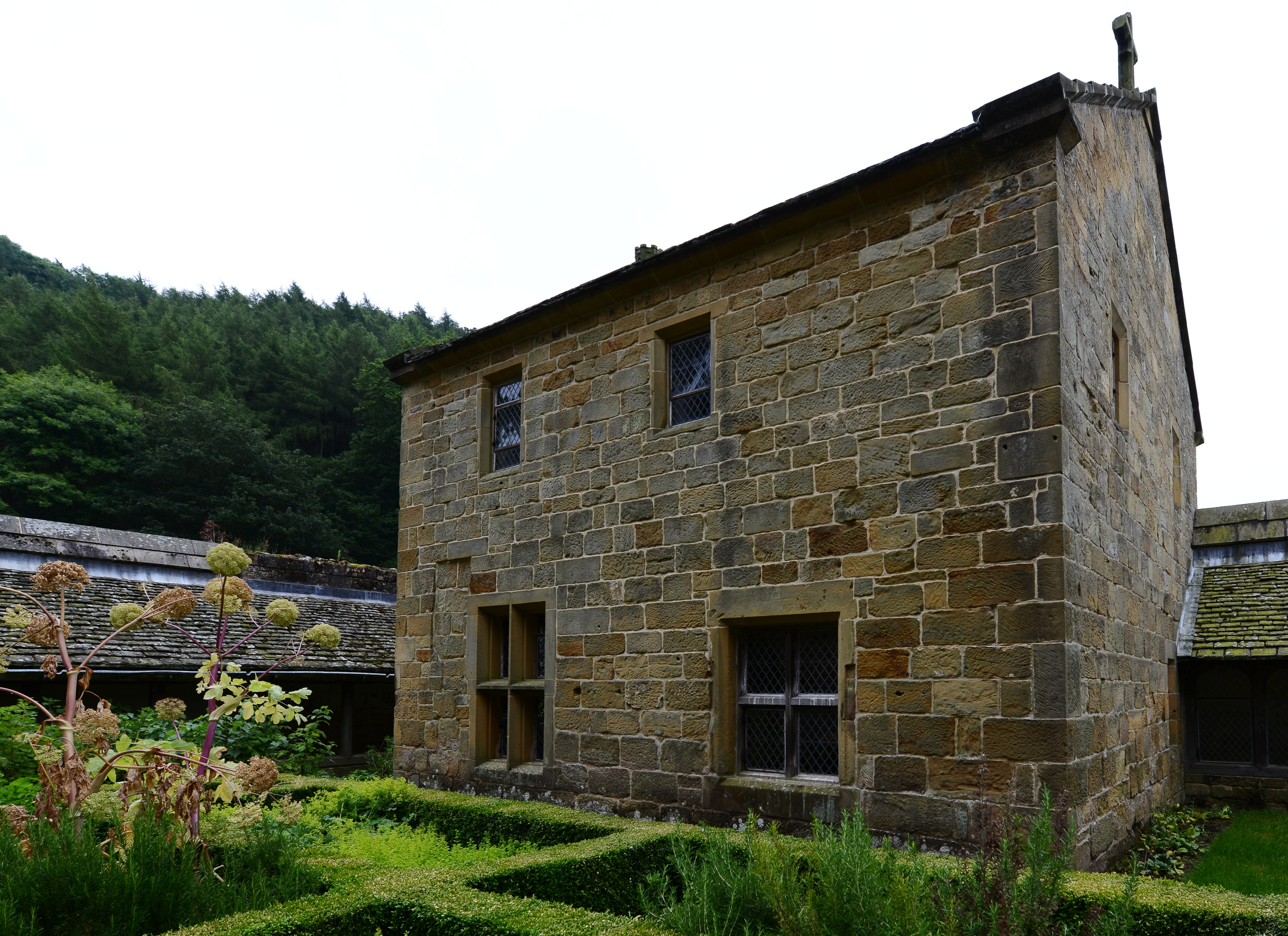
The reconstructed monk's cell as seen from its cell garden

The property is owned by the National Trust and under the care of English Heritage.

Visitors today can see the layout of the whole monastery, including one reconstructed monk's cell, together with the typically small Carthusian church and the later house. There is also a museum on the site detailing the history of the priory.

English Heritage lets the Prior's Lodge as a holiday cottage.

== Priors and rectors of Mount Grace ==
The Houses of Carthusian monks: Priory of Mount Grace lists a number of the priors of the house, together with the years they are known to have held office. It might not be correct, as the first two entries could be rectors not priors; nor is it complete as (for example) Carthusian records show Nicholas Love or Luff to be the first prior and fourth rector. The list is:

1. Robert Tredwye or Tredewy, 1398
2. Edmund, occurs 1399
3. Nicholas Luff, occurs 1413, 1415, 1416 (Period of office ends in 1417 according to other sources.)
4. Robert Layton, occurs 1421
5. Thomas Lockington – Prior from 1421 to 1447 (given in "The typescript List of Obiits of the Carthusians of the English Houses") ("The Houses of Carthusian Monks..." shows "Thomas, occurs 1428" and "Thomas Lockington, occurs 1436, 1437, 1439" as separate entries.)
6. Robert, occurs 1449, 1454
7. Robert Leke, occurs 1469, 1473
8. Thomas, occurs 1475, 1476
9. Thomas, occurs 1497
10. Henry Eccleston, occurs 1501, 1506
11. John, occurs 1527–8, 1531–2
12. William (?) Fletcher, occurs 1532–3
13. John Wilson, occurs 1537–8

== See also ==
- Grade I listed buildings in North Yorkshire (district)
- Listed buildings in East Harlsey
- The Shrine of Our Lady of Mount Grace
