= East Harlsey =

Village and civil parish in North Yorkshire, England

Coordinates: 54°23′31″N 1°20′55″W

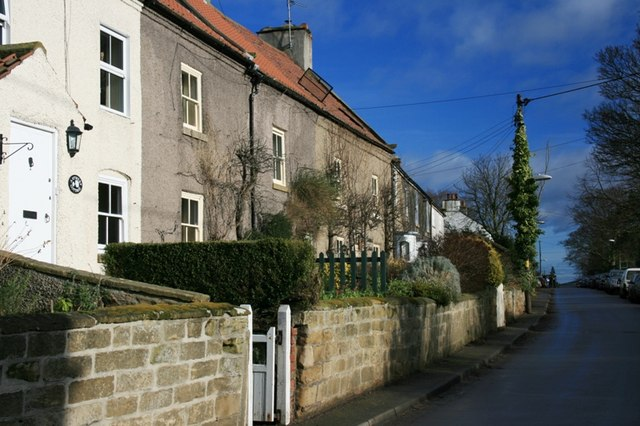
- A row of houses in East Harlsey

- Location within North Yorkshire
- Population: 281 (2011 census)
- OS grid reference: SE422997
- Unitary authority: North Yorkshire
- Ceremonial county: North Yorkshire
- Region: Yorkshire and the Humber
- Country: England
- Sovereign state: United Kingdom
- Post town: NORTHALLERTON
- Postcode district: DL6
- Dialling code: 01609
- Police: North Yorkshire
- Fire: North Yorkshire
- Ambulance: Yorkshire
- UK Parliament: Richmond and Northallerton

East Harlsey is a village and civil parish in the county of North Yorkshire, England. It is about 1 mile (2 km) west of Ingleby Arncliffe and the A19 and 6 miles (10 km) north-east of Northallerton. The population of the village as measured at the 2011 census was 281.

From 1974 to 2023 it was part of the Hambleton District, it is now administered by the unitary North Yorkshire Council.

Within the village there is a pub called the 'Cat and Bagpipes'. St Oswald's Church, East Harlsey originated in the 12th century and is a grade II* listed building.

Harlsey Hall manor house is in the centre of the village: the manor was the property of the Lascelles family from the 11th century until 1654, when it passed to the Trotter Bannerman family, and from 1825, to the Maynard family.

Comedian Roy 'Chubby' Brown has a home at Harlsey Manor, to the east of East Harlsey.

== Sport ==
East Harlsey has a cricket team, the first record of which is from 1908. The club provides teams for the Langbaurgh League and Northallerton and District Evening League, as well as competing in a number of local cup competitions.

== See also ==
- Mount Grace Priory
- Listed buildings in East Harlsey
