= Pseudo-Bonaventure =

Collective name for the authors of a number of medieval devotional works

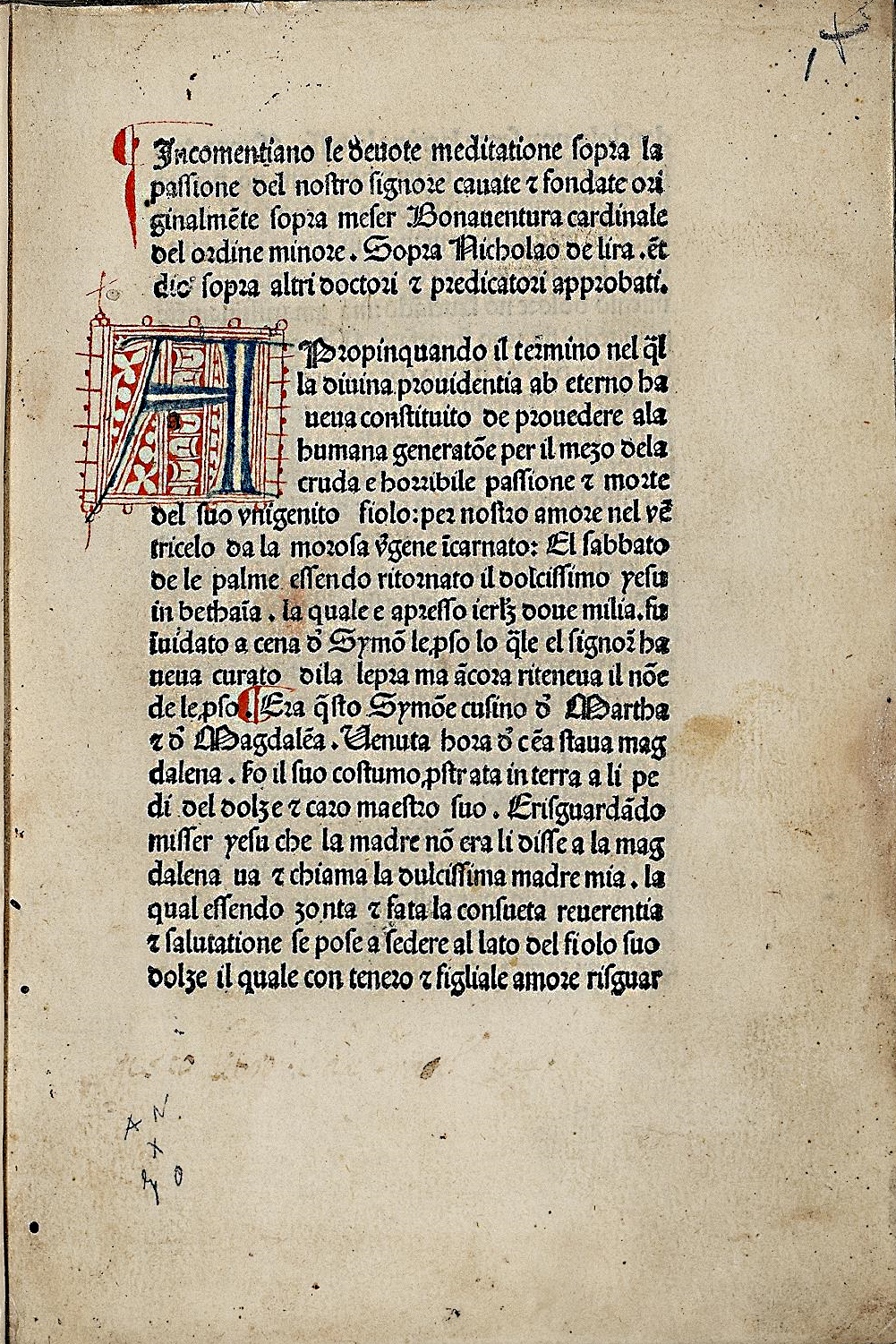
Meditationes vitae Christi (Giovanni de' Cauli?), c. 1478

Pseudo-Bonaventure (Latin: Pseudo-Bonaventura) is the name given to the authors of a number of medieval devotional works which were believed at the time to be the work of Bonaventure: "It would almost seem as if 'Bonaventura' came to be regarded as a convenient label for a certain type of text, rather than an assertion of authorship". Since it is clear a number of actual authors are involved, the term "Pseudo-Bonaventuran" is often used. Many works now have other attributions of authorship which are generally accepted, but the most famous, the Meditations on the Life of Christ, remains usually described only as a work of Pseudo-Bonaventure.

== Other works ==
- Ars concionandi, a treatise of the ars praedicandi type
- Biblia pauperum ("Poor Man's Bible" – a title only given in the 20th century), a short typological version of the Bible, also extremely popular, and often illustrated. There were different versions of this, the original perhaps by the Dominican Nicholas of Hanapis.
- Speculum Beatæ Mariæ Virginis by Conrad of Saxony
- Speculum Disciplinæ, Epistola ad Quendam Novitium and Centiloquium, all probably by Bonanventura's secretary, Bernard of Besse
- Legend of Saint Clare
- Theologia Mystica, probably by Hugh of Balma.
- Philomena, a poem now attributed to John Peckham, Archbishop of Canterbury from 1279 to 1292.
