= College of St Bonaventure =

Franciscan publishing centre

The College of St Bonaventure (Latin: Collegium Sancti Bonaventurae; Italian: Collegio di San Bonaventura) at Quaracchi (Clara Aqua), near Florence, Italy, is a publishing centre of the Order of Friars Minor.

== History ==
It was founded 14 July 1879, by Bernardino del Vago, Archbishop of Sardis, then minister general of the order. The first director and superior of the college was Fidelis of Fauna, under whose management a new edition of the works of St. Bonaventure was inaugurated. His successors were Ignatius Jeiler and Leonhard Lemmens.

== Quaracchi editions ==
Works published at Quaracchi, and edited by the friars there, besides the Opera Omnia of St. Bonaventure, included the Analecta Franciscana, edited in greatest part by Quinctianus Muller (d. 1902), which contain a collection of chronicles relating to the early history of the Franciscan order. Besides these, there were the Bibliotheca Franciscana scholastica medii aevi, and the Bibliotheca Franciscana ascetica medii aevi, inaugurated in 1904 with a critical edition of the writings of Francis of Assisi.,

As well as continuing the "Annales" of Luke Wadding, the twenty-fifth volume of which appeared in 1899, the friars of the college edited a number of other publications of a purely devotional and literary character. In 1903 a new critical edition of the work of Alexander of Hales was undertaken. The "Acta Ordinis", a monthly in Latin, and the official organ of the order, and the new "Archivum Franciscano-Historicum", were published at Quaracchi.

== Attribution ==
- The entry cites:
  - St. Anthony's Almanac (1906);
  - Carmichael in The Month (January, 1904).
