= Censorship of the Bible =

Censorship of the Bible includes restrictions and prohibition of possessing, reading, or using the Bible in general or any particular editions or translations of it.

Violators of Bible prohibitions have at times been punished by imprisonment, forced labor, banishment and execution, as well as by the burning or confiscating of the Bible or Bibles used or distributed. The censorship may be because of explicit religious reasons, but also for reasons of public policy or state control, especially in authoritarian states or following violent riots.

Censorship of the Bible has occurred in the past and continues today. In the 20th century, Christian resistance to the Soviet Union's policy of state atheism occurred through Bible-smuggling. The People's Republic of China, officially an atheist state, engages in Bible burning as a part of antireligious campaigns there.

The extent and nature of past censorship of the Bible in Western Europe are controversial. Historically, Catholic writers have portrayed restrictions on vernacular translations as temporary prudential responses to regional outbreaks of organized violence and heresy with a policing rather than theological basis; Protestant writers have portrayed them as churchmen suppressing the truth in order to maintain power.

In most cases, the bans on pious lay people possessing or publicly reading certain Bibles were related to unauthorized vernacular Scripture editions not derived from the Latin Vulgate, or from orthodox translations also containing heretical or confusing material. Clerics were never forbidden to possess the Vulgate Bible translation in Latin. The Index Librorum Prohibitorum (Note: also called Index Romanus or "Roman Index") of the Catholic Church included various translations or editions of the Bible.

== Background ==
The Old Testament was written mostly in Hebrew and partly in Aramaic. The New Testament was written in Koine Greek, a form of ancient Greek. The books were translated into several other languages, including Latin and Gothic. From about AD 300 onward, Latin began to assert itself as the language of worship in Western Christianity. This was aided by the fact many European languages, called the Romance languages, are all descended from Latin. In contrast the earliest written Western Germanic languages date only from the 6th century. From AD 382–420, a new translation was made into the Latin vernacular, the Vulgate, which became the dominant translation for Western Christianity in the 7th-9th centuries. From about the 9th century it was regarded as the only valid Bible translation. (Note: See Bible translations in the Middle Ages) In Eastern Christianity, on the other hand, Greek remained dominant.

== Diocletianic Persecution ==
During the Diocletianic Persecution, Bibles were targeted as part of a larger program intended to wipe out Christianity. On February 24, 303, Diocletian's first so-called "Edict against the Christians" was published. (Note: The edict might not actually have been an "edict" in the technical sense; Eusebius does not refer to it as such, and the passage in the Passio Felicis which includes the word edictum ("exiit edictum imperatorum et Caesarum super omnem faciem terrae") may simply have been written to echo Luke 2:1 ("exiit edictum a Caesare Augusto ut profiteretur universus orbis terrae"). Elsewhere in the passion, the text is called a programma. The text of the edict itself does not actually survive.) Among other persecutions against Christians, Diocletian ordered the destruction of their scriptures and liturgical books across the entire Roman empire. (Note: This apparently included any house in which scriptures were found.)

== During the Middle Ages ==
For the ordinary semi-literate or illiterate laity, the main source of scripture was oral and regular: the priest's vernacular paraphrase of the day's readings according to the liturgical calendar during the homily, bolstered by derived works such as dramas, poems, songs, icons, paintings, carvings and sculptures.

Historian Wim Francois notes "the late medieval Catholic church did not forbid the reading of the Bible in the vernacular, [...] there was no central Roman policy [...] pertaining to Bible reading in the vernacular, and [...] biblical books circulated in most of Europe's linguistic regions." Bans were regional and on unauthorized translations, and often used the policing of actual or predicted violence as a justification.

=== Old Church Slavonic ===
There were some controversies about whether the translation in Old Church Slavonic was permissible. According to St. Methodius, he was officially allowed to use it by John VIII in 880.

Yet Christians were forbidden to use the Old Church Slavonic translation by John X in 920 and by the Lateran Synod of 1059, with the synod being confirmed by Nicholas II and Alexander II. In a letter to Duke Vratislaus II of Bohemia dated January 2, 1080, Pope Gregory VII refused to re-establish the earlier permission to use the Slavonic language liturgy, including the scripture reading. The reason he gave, in the explicit context of questioning Vratislaus' loyalty and orthodoxy in the highly political Investiture Controversy, was that "(Not without reason has it pleased Almighty God that) the Sacred Scripture should be obscure in certain places, lest, if it were freely open to all, it would perhaps become worthless and would be subject to scorn, or it would perversely lead the mind into error due to mediocre translations." (Note: See Tyniec § Cyrillo-Methodian Monastery for more on this)

=== Waldensians: France and Italy ===
Between 1170 and 1180, Peter Waldo commissioned a cleric from Lyon to translate the New Testament into the vernacular "Romance" (Franco-Provençal). He is credited with providing Western Europe with the first translation of the Scriptures in a 'modern tongue' outside of Latin. In 1199, Pope Innocent III, writing in a letter to the bishop of Metz about Waldensians, banned secret meetings (which he labeled as occultis conventiculis, or "hidden assemblies") in which the Bible was freely discussed. However, he noted that the desire to read and study the divine scriptures was not to blame; rather, he commended it. (Note: See Bible translations in the Middle Ages§ Innocent III" for more on this)

=== Cathars/Albigensians ===
==== France ====
After the end of the Albigensian Crusade, the provincial Council of Toulouse (1229) tightened the provisions against the heretics in this ecclesiastical province. The Inquisition procedure was adopted, and the University of Toulouse was founded, also called the Catholic Institute of Toulouse. At the synod, a general Scripture book ban was pronounced for lay people of this ecclesiastical province; only Psalterium and Brevier in Latin were allowed.

"We prohibit also that the laity should be permitted to have the books of the Old and New Testaments; unless anyone from the motives of devotion should wish to have the Psalter or the Breviary for divine offices or the hours of the blessed Virgin; but we most strictly forbid their having any translation of these books."

— Council of Toulouse

This quote was not repeated in 1233 at the provincial Council held in Bréziers. Although sections of the Council of Toulouse were used, this statement was omitted.

At the synod of Béziers (Concilium Biterrense) in 1246 (Note: See Abraham of Aragon and Yellow badge § Medieval and early modern Europe for more on this council.) it was also decided that the laity should have no Latin and vernacular and the clergy no vernacular theological books.

==== Spain ====
At the provincial Second Council of Tarragona (Conventus Tarraconensis) in 1234, the Spanish bishops, according to a decree of King James I of Aragon, declared that it was forbidden for anyone to own a Romance language translation of books of the Old and New Testament. This had to be burned within eight days, otherwise they would be suspected as heretics.

The bans were not permanent but responses to exigencies. The provincial Council of Tarragona of 1318 introduced bans for the Beguines which were obsolete by 1329.

==== Germany ====
At the diocesan synod of Trier (Synodus Dioecesana Trevirensis) convened by Archbishop Theodoric II in 1231, alleged heretics called anachronistically Euchites were described as having translated the scriptures into German:

…heresy was arising on all sides. In the year of 1231 in Trier, heretics were caught in three schools. And several of them belonged to that sect, and many of them were taught from the sacred scriptures, which they had translated into German.

— Synod of Diocese of Tier

Charles IV, Holy Roman Emperor issued an edict against German interpretations of Scripture at the request of Pope Urban V 1369 in Lucca, This was in order that such interpreters would not seduce laymen and malevolent spirits to heresy or error. Nevertheless, his son allowed the German translation of the Wenceslas Bible in 1385, a manuscript that, if finished, would have been the costliest and largest Bible of the Middle Ages.

=== England: Lollardy ===
There is a controversy among academics over the connection of the Middle English Bible translations known as the Wycliffite Bibles. These orthodox translations appeared in the 1380s and 1390s and in some cases included heterodox material associated with the Lollards, the religious wing of an anti-clerical political movement which to some extent drew inspiration or leadership from John Wycliffe.

John Wycliffe (1330–1384), a theologian espousing radical clerical poverty and some pre-Reformation views, is associated with some of the first translations of the Bible from Latin into English from 1382 to 1395. Some of his theological-political teachings were rejected in 1381 by Oxford University and in 1382 by the church. He was forced to retire, for fear of a popular uprising.

In 1401, Parliament passed the De heretico comburendo law in order to suppress Wycliffe's followers and censor their books. His associates or helpers Nicholas Hereford and John Purvey subsequently appealed or escaped charges of heresy by recanting Wycliffite theological-political teachings; the issue of bible translations was not part of it.

The translations of the Bible especially with added polemical material caused great unrest among some clergy, and several defensive provincial synods were convened, such as the provincial 3rd Council of Oxford (ended in 1408). Under the chairmanship of Archbishop Thomas Arundel, official positions against Wycliffe were written in the Oxford Constitution (which applied at the University of Oxford) and so-called Arundel's Constitution (which applied to a wider area of England.) The latter reads as follows:

[…] that no one in the future by his own authority will translate any text of Holy Scripture into the English tongue or any other, into any other by way of book or treatise. Nor let any such a book or treatise be read, whether new in the time of said John Wycliffe written or written in the future, be read in part or whole, in public or in private, under the punishment of the greater excommunication, till that translation has been approved by the bishop of the place or, if necessary, a provincial council. But those who transgress this should be punished like a heretic and false teacher.

— Arundel's Constitution

New published translations of liturgical readings and preaching texts (psalms, pericopes from the Gospels and Epistles) were now bound to an examination by church authorities, though not banned as such. Previously and elsewhere, university theologians had an implied authority to make and publish such translations; in any case, bishops usually delegated review to the universities. Individuals like William Butler wanted to go even further and also limit Bible translations to the Latin language alone. (Note: Arundel allegedly condemned Wycliffe as "that pestilent wretch of damnable memory, yea, the forerunner and disciple of anti-christ who, as the complement of his wickedness, invented a new translation of the Scriptures into his mother-tongue.")

However, modern academics such as Henry Ansgar Kelly, in part following Thomas More, interpret Arundel's Constitution as attributing the orthodox translations to exist by Wycliffe's time and so not restricting or banning them. However, even if this is correct, over the course of the fifteenth century, as the connection of even orthodox translations with Lollardy increased in the public mind, the production of new manuscripts and the use of translations waned.

At the ecumenical Council of Constance in 1415, Wycliffe was ultimately proclaimed a heretic; his body was removed from a church burial place. (Note: In 1428 his bones were burned and scattered into the local river. This may have been to prevent the development of a saint or relic cult around Wycliff: some local Lollards believed a miraculous spring had sprung where his bones were buried.) However, the Bible or vernacular translation is not mentioned in the list of Wycliffe's 45 heretical positions by the council, nor are they mentioned in the censorship of "the books called by him Dialogus and Trialogus and many other treatises, works and pamphlets."

The so-called Wycliffite translations of the Bible have survived to the present day in over 250 manuscripts, usually as selections of books, many without unorthodox added Lollard material. (Note: "It has, moreover, been demonstrated that changes to the layout, such as the removal of Wycliffite paratextual material (the Great Prologue and marginal glosses particularly), the addition of the old testament readings from the Mass to new testament manuscripts, and a table of contents facilitating the retrieval of the liturgical readings made the copies also acceptable to an orthodox—both clerical and lay—readership." See Francois op. cit.)

The early English printing industry was impeded in pre-Reformation England, compared to the rest of Europe where vernacular Bible production formed a significant part.

Wycliffe's Bible was not printed until 1731, when Wycliffe was historically conceived as the forefather of the English Reformation.

==== Protestant ====
The next English Bible translation was that of William Tyndale, whose Tyndale Bible had to be printed from 1525 outside England in areas of Germany sympathetic to Protestantism. Tyndale himself was executed after refusing to recant his Lutheranism, and was not charged for infringing any law relating to vernacular translation.

Protestant martyrologist John Foxe's claimed that seven people were burnt for teaching their children the Pater Noster, Creed and Ten Commandments in English. Contemporary Jesuit Robert Parsons wrote "Who will believe this monstrous tale [... this] fiction that we (Catholics) hold reading of scriptures in English [...] as heresy?"

In 1539 Henry VII passed censorship laws that required government licensing before printing or selling English Bibles in England, or importing or selling any book with annotations.

=== Controversy: Censorship of Vernacular Translations ===
The nature and extent of censorship of vernacular published Bibles in various regions over history is contested by historians.

The following list has information that may be useful in weighing up claims in popular histories, and information elsewhere in this article:

- Pope Innocent III's Cum ex iniuncto (1199) did not ban vernacular Bibles or translation, but the secret meetings of the Waldensians.
- The "Councils" of Toulouse, Bréziers, Tarragona, Oxford and Tier were provincial councils (i.e., of local bishops) or synods, not ecumenical councils that set the policy for the whole Church.
- Oral translation or paraphrase of scripture readings embedded into the homily was a required duty for parish priests and bishops at all times, sometimes requiring consultation, and the most common form of sermon. For example, in 1051 Archbishop Ælfric Puttoc ordered "The mass-priest shall, on Sundays and mass-days, tell to the people the sense of the gospel in English." This practise is attested by written sermons from the Old English Blickling Homilies (971) to the Middle English Northern Homily Cycle (1315). The nature and extent of this as a collaborative oral tradition is not part of the written history recorded.
- The Synod of the Lateran (1112) was a synod, and should not be confused with the First (1122), Second (11), Third (1139), Fourth (1215) or Fifth (1512–1517) Lateran Councils, which were ecumenical councils. The first four did not mention books, translations or Bibles. Lateran V Session X established authorization requirements for printed books (as distinct from manuscripts) in general.
- John Wycliffe's 1382 censure by the University of Oxford did not mention vernacular Bibles or translation, but primarily concerned his eucharistic doctrine. The Pope's subsequent censure of his twenty-four propositions did not mention vernacular Bibles or translation.
- De heretico comburendo (1401) does not mention the vernacular Bibles or translation. The implementation act, the Suppression of Heresy Act 1414, similarly does not ban vernacular Bibles or translation, and indeed specifies that possession of such must not be taken as evidence of heresy.
- The heresy condemnations of Wycliffe and Huss at the ecumenical Council of Constance did not mention vernacular Bibles or translation.
- Tyndale's heresy charges did not mention vernacular Bibles or translation, nor were they illegal in the jurisdiction of his arrest and trial.

== From the printing press until the Reformation ==
Around 1440–1450, Johannes Gutenberg invented a printing press with movable type, with which he produced the Gutenberg Bible. His invention quickly spread throughout Europe. In 1466, the Mentelin Bible was the first vernacular language Bible to be printed. It was a word-for-word translation from the Latin Vulgate.

Pope Paul II (pontificate 1464–1471) allegedly (Note: This confirmation was claimed 114 years later in a debate but is "an allegation that is very difficultly to prove.") confirmed the decree of James I of Aragon on the local prohibition of Bibles in the Spanish vernacular languages. Under Isabella I of Castile and her husband Ferdinand II of Aragon, the printing of vernacular Bibles was prohibited in the Spanish state law. The Spanish Inquisition, which they instituted, ordered the destruction of all Hebrew books and all vernacular Bibles in 1497. This was five years after the expulsion of the Jews from Spain. In 1498, the Inquisition stated that it was impossible to translate the Bible into a modern language without making mistakes that would plunge unskilled and especially new converts into doubts about faith.

The first complete printed translation of the Bible into a Romance language, a transfer of the Vulgate into Valencian, was made by the Carthusian Order's General Bonifaci Ferrer (1355–1417) in 1478.

By letter of March 17, 1479, Sixtus IV authorized the rector and dean of the University of Cologne to intervene with ecclesiastical censors against printers, buyers and readers of heretical books. This authorization was approved by Pope Alexander VI. In several theological and non-theological books from this period a printing patent is included in the publications. From this time, printing patents of the Patriarch of Venice can also be found. With the censorship of January 4, 1486, and an executive order of January 10, the Elector-Archbishop Berthold von Henneberg of Mainz can be considered a pioneer in censorship regulation in the German-speaking countries for Mainz, Erfurt, and Frankfurt. His censorship decisions did not concern secular topics, but instead targeted specific religious texts, especially translations from Latin and Greek into German. Berthold was of the opinion that the German language was too poor to reproduce the precise and well-formulated Latin and Greek texts. Up to this time, no heretical writings had appeared printed in German, but since 1466 about ten relatively identical German Bible translations were completed. He commented:

Divine printing makes the use of books accessible to the world for instruction and edification. But many, as we have seen, misuse this art out of lust for glory and greed for money, so that they destroy humanity instead of enlightening it. Thus, in the hands of the people, which are translated from Latin into German, libri de divinis officiis et apicibus religionis nostrae can be found for the reduction of religion and its peaks. The sacred laws and canons, however, are composed by wise and eloquent men with such great care and skill, and their understanding is so difficult that the duration of human life, even for the most discerning, is scarcely sufficient to cope with them. Nevertheless, some cheeky and ignorant people have dared to translate those writings into such poor ordinary German that even scholars are seduced by their work into great misunderstandings.

— Berthold von Henneberg

In 1490 a number of Hebrew Bibles and other Jewish books were burned in Andalucía at the behest of the Spanish Inquisition.

== 16th century ==
In the early 1500s, several independent Catholic efforts brought out new Greek, Latin and Hebrew editions for scholars, which bootstrapped the vernacular translations that followed.

From 1516 to 1535, Erasmus of Rotterdam published several editions of his Novum Instrumentum omne: it was a double edition of the New Testament with both a revised Latin version as well as the first print of the Greek text. In 1520, the Complutensian Polyglot Bible (Latin, Greek, Hebrew, Aramaic) with both Testaments was published. In 1527, Santes Pagnino published his word-for-word New and Old Testament (Latin, Greek, Hebrew in Latin letters). All were made with Papal approval.

On the eve of the Council of Trent, there was no outright ban on vernacular Bible reading in the Catholic world, but only regionally diversified positions. In Germany, the Low Countries, Bohemia, Poland, and Italy, vernacular Bibles circulated and were widely read since the Middle Ages. Censorship measures, however, existed in England and Spain, where the official Church had to deal with what it considered erroneous “Bible-based" faith-systems. In France, it was the advent of l'évangélisme in the 1520s that gave cause to more restrictive measures.

— Wim François

The 1515 ecumenical Fifth Council of the Lateran, Session X, established requirements for printed books (as distinct from manuscripts): bishops were to set up book-vetting experts; it specifically mentioned books translated into Latin and vernacular books, but not Scriptures specifically.

In 1517, Luther published his Ninety-five Theses. In 1521, he was excommunicated with the bull Decet Romanum Pontificem, declared a heretic, and was issued the Edict of Worms. In 1522, the first translation of Luther's New Testament was published. It was translated influenced by the Greek text of Erasmus. In 1534, the entire Holy Scripture was printed in German, completing the Luther Bible.

=== Germany (Holy Roman Empire) ===
The Edict of Worms against Luther was not enforced throughout the empire. In 1523, at the Reichstag in Nuremberg the papal nuncio Francesco Chieregati asked for the Holy Roman Empire to enforce the clause of the Lateran V Council against printing any book without the permission of the local bishop or his representative. He also wanted the Edict of Worms to be enforced. Instead, on March 6, 1523, it was decreed that until the demanded new ecumenical council could be held, local rulers themselves should ensure that no new writings were printed or sold in their territories unless they had been approved by reasonable men. Other writings, especially those of an insulting nature, were to be banned under severe punishment.

The 1529 Diet of Speyer limited its decrees essentially to repeating the resolutions of the 1523 Diet of Augsburg. On May 13, 1530, the papal nuncio gave the Emperor a memorandum which recommended that the Edict of Worms and the bull of Leo X were to be implemented by imperial decree and on pain of punishment. Following the Protestation at Speyer at the conclusion of the Reichstag on November 19, 1530, it was decided that nothing should be printed without specifying the printer and the printing location. The nuncio's request had failed.

As part of the 1541 Diet of Regensburg which set the terms of the Regensburg Interim, the rule against publishing insults was repeated.

At the 1548 Diet of Augsburg, which pronounced the terms of the Augsburg Interim, the ordinance against insults was repeated and the previous provisions were extended to include the name of the author or poet. In addition, books were to be checked before printing by the "ordinary authority of every place." There was a sentiment against that which was "rebellious and ignominious or unruly or obnoxious to the Catholic Doctrine of the Holy Christian Church." The already printed books of Luther were to be suppressed. The Holy Roman Imperial Fiscal official was to intervene against the offending authorities.

Around this time, the papal Index Librorum Prohibitorum began to be developed. After the 1555 Peace of Augsburg ended the Augsburg Interim and increased religious freedom by declaring cuius regio, eius religio, the papal Index Librorum Prohibitorum was only observed as law in Catholic territories.

=== England ===
In 1534, the Canterbury Convocation requested that the king commission a new translation of the Bible by suitable persons and authorize the reading of the new translation. Although the king did not designate translators, new translations appeared from 1535 and afterwards. In 1536 and 1538, Thomas Cromwell prescribed that Coverdale's translation of the Bible was to be placed in every church. These Bibles were to be printed in a large size and chained to prevent theft. This translation came to be called the "Great Bible" or "Chained Bible."

=== Papal States and Catholic ===
==== Index Auctorum et Liberii ====
During the early stages of the Council of Trent, Pope Pius IV issued an initial Index of Forbidden Books in 1559. This early version was particularly strict and short-lived. It prohibited 30 Bible editions, including those linked to Martin Luther and 10 New Testament editions linked to Erasmus. It also included two general rules banning similar Bible editions.

- Latin: Biblia cum recognitione Martini Luteri.
  - Bible with the revisions of Martin Luther.
- Latin: Cum universis similibus Bibliis ubicunque excusis.
  - with all similar Bibles from anywhere.
- Latin: Novum Testamentum cum duplici interpretatione D.[esiderius] Erasmi & veteris interpretis. Harmonia item Evangelica, & copioso Indice
  - New Testament with double interpretation of Erasmus and old interpretation (Vulgate), i.e., the 4th edition. Also harmony and copious index.
- Latin: Cum omnibus similibus libris Novi Testamenti.
  - and all similar New Testament books.

==== "Tridentine", Roman and non-Roman Indexes ====
===== Status quo ante =====
In 1546, in an early session of the Council of Trent, Spanish Cardinal Pedro Pacheco alarmed his peers by suggesting a blanket ban on vernacular Bibles. The Papal legates argued against it, noting such bans in various regions had been driven by secular authorities for local pragmatic political purposes such as forcing peace; their secretary wrote:

And, would the realms of the Spanish and French ever receive the Sacred Books translated in the vernacular? Surely not, since such a translation has been prohibited by royal edicts under the threat of severe punishments, these people would let themselves be guided more by the secular power than by conciliar permission. Moreover, the people in this area have long since learned through experience what kind of scandal, damage, impiousness, and evil such translation has brought in their realms. And would the Germans, Italians, Polish, and other nations be prepared to accept a negative decision? Surely not, since, by contrast, they have seen in several parts of their territory what kind of edification and instruction may result from such a version.

— Angelo Massarelli, Letter to Cardinal Pacheco, March 22, 1546

Historian Wim François notes "that Massarelli's depiction has not received the same resonance as Martin Luther's bold assertion, that the Bible was largely unavailable to the medieval faithful (which implied that he and his coreligionists had finally made the Word accessible to the common people), is an understatement."

===== General rules for the "Tridentine" and Roman Indexes =====
The Council of Trent, in the early 1560s, declined to make a specific list, but gave general rules for which documents and authors should be allowed or suppressed: the Decretum de indice librorum. With the papal bull Dominici gregis custodiae the so-called Latin: Index tridentinus (Tridentine Index) was published on March 24, 1564, by the Pope.

- The Decretum reset banned books to the situation in 1515. (Rule 1.) On that base:
- All the writings of all arch-heresiarchs (all Reformers) were included on the index, if they dealt with religion. (Rule 2)
- Reading of Catholic vernacular translations of the Vulgate was allowed, requiring only written permission of the reader's confessor (e.g., the local priest) for protection. (Rule 4)
- Sound Latin translations, even by heretics, of Church Fathers and the Old Testament which elucidated rather than compete with the Vulgate was allowable for scholars, if expurgated; however, translations of the New Testament by heretics were dangerous and had little utility: nevertheless, expurgated annotations were allowed. (Rule 3)
- New works should be submitted to Bishops, with a regime that favoured expurgation rather than outright banning, depending on local conditions. (Rules 6, 8, 10)

For Bibles and commentaries, Rules 3 and 4 came into play:

Rule 3.
The translations of older ecclesiastical writers (for example, Church Fathers) published by authors of the first class (heretics, i.e. Reformers) are allowed if they do not oppose the sound doctrine. Translations [in Latin] by scholars and pious men of Old Testament books originating from first-class authors may be authorized by bishops, but only as explanations of the Vulgate for understanding the Scriptures and not as Bible texts. On the other hand, translations [in Latin] of the New Testament are not to be permitted by first-class authors, because reading them does not bring much benefit to the readers. Instead, such translations pose much danger. Commentaries by first-class authors, on the condition they are associated with such Old Testament or Vulgate translations, may be allowed for use by pious and learned men after theologically suspect men have been dealt with by theological faculties or the Roman Inquisition: this is true of the so-called Bible of the Vatablus. Forewords and Prolegomena are to be removed from the Bibles of Isidore Clarius; But let no one take the text of it as the text of the Vulgate.

Rule 4.

Since experience teaches that if the reading of the Bible in the vernacular is permitted to all without distinction more harm than good results because of the audacity of men, the judgment of the bishop and inquisitor should be decisive with respect to vernacular translations.

The reading of the Bible in vernacular translations by Catholic writers may be permitted at the judgement of the applicable counselor or confessor. The counselor or confessor may permit the reading of such translations when they realize that reading such translations can bring no harm, but instead will augment faith and piety.

This permission should be given in writing. He who reads or has read a Bible in the vernacular without such permission should not be able to receive absolution from his sins until he has delivered the Bible translation to the bishop. Booksellers who sell or otherwise procure Bibles in the vernacular to those who lack permission shall be required to pay for books for the bishop to use for religious purposes. Other punishments may be given according to the nature of the offense, with penalties that expire at a set time. Members of Religious orders may not read and buy such Bibles without the permission of their superiors.

The rules were reprinted in each version until the reform in 1758. Believers were forbidden to make, read, own, buy, sell or give away these unauthorized books on the basis of excommunication.

Subsequent versions of the list were called the Latin: Index Librorum Prohibitorum or the "Roman index" to distinguish it from the (deived) Indexes of other major Catholic regions.

===== Non-Roman Indexes =====
The rule remained valid until 1758. How it was dealt with in each country was different. In a Catholic country like Bavaria, it was state law. In particular, booksellers had their licenses revoked for violating it. In contrast, in Württemberg, a refuge of Protestantism, the index functioned more like a blacklist. But it also found application in elite Catholic schools in secularized France until the 20th century. In general, secularized France almost never used the Roman Index.

== 18th century ==
=== Unigenitus ===
In 1713, Clement XI issued the bull Unigenitus dei filius in order to fight against Jansenism. The bull condemned 101 excerpts quoted from the work Réflexions morales by Pasquier Quesnel, including the following propositions:

- It is useful and necessary at all times, in all places and for everyone, to explore and get to know the spirit, the piety and the secrets of the Scriptures. (Note: Utile et necessarum est omni tempore, omni loco, et omni personarum generi, studere el cognoscere spiritum, pietatem et mysteria sacræ Scripturæ.)
- Reading the scriptures is for everyone. (Note: Lectio sacræ Scripturæ est pro omnibus.)
- The obscurity of the Holy Word of God is not a reason why laymen should excuse themselves from reading it. (Note: Obscuritas sancti verbi Dei non est laicis ratio dispensandi se ipsos ab ejus lectione.)
- The Lord's day ought to be hallowed by Christians by readings of piety, and, above all, of the Holy Scripture. (Note: Dies Dominicus a Christianis debet sanctificari lectionibus pietatis et super omnia sanctarum Scripturarum.)
- It is injurious to wish that a Christian draw back from that reading. (Note: Damnosum est, velle Christianum ad hac lectione retrahere.)
- To snatch the New Testament from the hands of Christians, or to keep it closed to them by taking away from them this manner of understanding it, is to close to them the mouth of Christ. (Note: Abripere e Christianorum manibus novum Testamentum seu eis illud clausum tenere auferendo eis modum istud intelligendi, est illis Christi os obturare.)
- To forbid Christians from reading the Holy Scriptures, especially the Four Gospels, is to forbid the use of light to the sons of light, and to cause them to suffer a certain kind of excommunication. (Note: Interdicere Christianis lectionem sacræ Scripturæ, præsertim Evangelii, est interdicere usum luminis filiis lucis et facere, ut patiantur speciem quamdam excommunicationis.)

This bull was controversial among the French clergy for various reasons. But the 1719 bull Pastoralis officii threatened excommunication on all who did not submit to Unigenitus dei filius.

=== Punishments against violators ===
As part of a program of persecution against the Salzburg Protestants, in 1731, Leopold Anton von Firmian – Archbishop of Salzburg as well as its temporal ruler as Count, ordered the wholesale seizure and burning of all Protestant books and Bibles.

On May 27, 1747, Jakob Schmidlin ("Sulzijoggi") was hanged as a leader of a pietist movement with seditionist Lutheran sympathies, in the canton of Lucerne in Galgenwäldli on the Emme. The charges included distributing forbidden (i.e., Lutheran) material. His corpse was burned along with a Luther Bible. He is considered the last Protestant martyr of Switzerland. 82 co-defendants were also punished, mostly with perpetual banishment. Since the Bible was at the center of this movement and violations of censorship rules against the use and possession of Bibles were one of the offenses committed by the convicted, after the trial the authorities issued a decree that included a general prohibition on laymen having Bibles:

We also want to prohibit all and each of our subjects who are not learned, from bringing and selling not only the uncatholic and forbidden books but also good Bibles. We further request that people who still have any Bibles or other forbidden or other seductive books should deliver them to their pastors or pastors within a fortnight from the announcement of this call; wherever such things are eventually discovered, we will proceed against them with appropriate sharpness ...

— Prince-Archbishop Leopold Anton von Firmian

== 19th century ==
=== Brittany ===
The first New Testament translation into Breton was published in 1827 by Protestants after the Catholic Church refused its publication.

=== Italy ===
The Duchy of Tuscany had a reputation for being liberal during the rule of Leopold II, even prior to 1849. There were three Protestant churches within the duchy: one English, one Scottish and one French. The French Protestant church held fairs in the Italian language. After the brief period during the republic the subsequent counter-revolution, the liberal climate changed to conservative. On May 18, 1849, 3,000 copies of a Catholic Italian translation of the Bible were confiscated and burned under the orders of Antonio Martini, the Archbishop of Florence, even though they had been printed with permission. Persecution of Protestants increased. In 1851, services in Italian were outlawed. The possession of a Protestant Italian Bible alone was considered sufficient evidence for conviction. The most prominent prisoner was Count Piero Guicciardini, who was arrested with six others. They had met on May 7, 1851, the day before his voluntary departure for religious exile, and read the Scriptures together. He was therefore sentenced to six months' imprisonment for blasphemy, which was then converted into exile.

=== Austro-Hungary ===
In the Austrian Empire, the Patent of Toleration was published on October 13, 1781. In addition, on June 22, 1782, and October 12, 1782, Joseph II issued court decrees explicitly authorizing the import and printing of Protestant books and stipulating that previously confiscated publications should be returned as long as they were not abusive towards the Catholic Church. These decrees were usually followed, but the reforms were not always followed everywhere throughout the empire. In 1854, in Buda, the police seized 121 Bibles found in a Protestant congregation and reduced 120 of them to pulp in a paper mill. In return, the congregation was given 21 kreuzers due to the value of the books as pulp as well as the one remaining Bible, "which is enough for the pastor."

=== Colombia ===
On December 7, 1859, in front of the Archbishop's Palace in Santa Fe de Bogotá in the then Granadine Confederation, some kind of book-burning episode took place by Catholic officials and people. The American ambassador (or "Minister") was accused of involvement, perhaps as political manipulation against the rising prospects of an (anti-Catholic) Mosquera regime, which was feared to become a military dictatorship. The ambassador from the Holy See stated that these were "obscene works, impious pamphlets, & publications condemned by the Church" and denied US involvement. Protestant claims were that these featured bibles brought in from the London Bible Society.

=== United States ===
In 1842, an itinerant French Jesuit student priest (oblate) named Telman burned 42 "Catholic" Bibles (from a much larger number dropped by "Protestant agents of the Bible Society") in Champlain, New York against the wishes of the local priest. It was immediately condemned as sacrilege by the local bishop. The Bishop appointed a joint Catholic/Protestant commission to investigate, which found it was the action of Telman alone, and not authorized.

=== Catholic ===
==== Protestant Bible societies ====
In 1816, Pius VII sent two breves concerning the Bible societies, one to the Archbishop of Gniezno and Primate of Poland (Nimio et Acerbo, June 29), and another to the Archbishop of Mohilev (Magno et acerbo, September 3). Both breves are very strongly against the translations in the vernacular of the Bible, which were not approved by the Catholic Church and letting untrained laypeople read the Bible. Magno et acerbo reads:

For you should have kept before your eyes the warnings which our predecessors have constantly given, namely, that, if the sacred books are permitted everywhere without discrimination in the vulgar tongue, more damage will arise from this than advantage. Furthermore, the Roman Church, accepting only the Vulgate edition according to the well-known prescription of the Council of Trent, disapproves the versions in other tongues and permits only those which are edited with the explanations carefully chosen from writings of the Fathers and Catholic Doctors, so that so great a treasure may not be exposed to the corruptions of novelties, and so that the Church, spread throughout the world, may be of one tongue and of the same speech. [...]
For this purpose, then, the heretics have been accustomed to make their low and base machinations, in order that by the publication of their vernacular Bibles, (of whose strange variety and discrepancy they, nevertheless, accuse one another and wrangle) they may, each one, treacherously insert their own errors wrapped in the more holy apparatus of divine speech. "For heresies are not born", St. Augustine used to say, "except when the true Scriptures are not well understood and when what is not well understood in them is rashly and boldly asserted." But, if we grieve that men renowned for piety and wisdom have, by no means rarely, failed in interpreting the Scriptures, what should we not fear if the Scriptures, translated into every vulgar tongue whatsoever, are freely handed on to be read by an inexperienced people who, for the most part, judge not with any skill but with a kind of rashness?

— Magno et acerbo

Leo XII's Ubi primum (3 May 1824) also did not exhibit any liberal attitudes, referencing misleading commentary material, stating:

You have noticed a society, commonly called the Bible society, boldly spreading throughout the whole world. Rejecting the traditions of the holy Fathers and infringing the well-known decree of the Council of Trent, it works by every means to have the holy Bible translated, or rather mistranslated, into the ordinary languages of every nation. There are good reasons for fear that (as has already happened in some of their commentaries and in other respects by a distorted interpretation of Christ’s gospel) they will produce a gospel of men, or what is worse, a gospel of the devil!

— Ubi primum

Pius VIII's Traditi humilitati nostrae (1829) again notes the issue of "perverse writings" inserted into the Bibles, stating:

It is also necessary to watch over the societies of those who publish new translations of the Bible in every vulgar language, against the sane rules of the Church, whereby the texts are astutely distorted into aberrant meanings, according to the moods of each translator. These versions are distributed free of charge everywhere, with exorbitant costs, even to the most ignorant, and often perverse writings are inserted in them so that readers drink a lethal poison, where they thought they were drawing the waters of healthy wisdom. For some time the Apostolic See has warned the Christian people against this attack on the faith, and has condemned the authors of such a great misfortune. To this end, all the rules established by decision of the Council of Trent were recalled once again, as well as what was laid down by the Congregation of the Index itself, for which the vernacular versions of the sacred texts must not be allowed, unless approved by the Holy See, and accompanied by comments taken from the works of the Holy Fathers of the Church.

— Traditi humilitati nostrae

In 1836, Gregory XVI eliminated the relief made back in 1757. His encyclical letter Inter praecipuas of 1844 spoke out against the unauthorized vernacular Bibles of the Bible societies because of false teaching "interpolated" or "interpreted" into the translation. Hans-Josef Klauck considers, when commenting on this encyclical, that "there is a deep wisdom in the previous Catholic practice to forbid the independent reading of the Bible in the vernacular to laymen, or only to allow it with considerable caution, because they ultimately threaten to undermine the teaching authority of the Church."

Pius IX wrote in 1846 his encyclical Qui pluribus against "the most impudent Bible societies, which renewed the ancient artifice of the heretics and translated the books of the Divine Scriptures, contrary to the most sacrosanct rules of the Church, into all national languages and often provided twisted explanations."

The documents Ubi primum, Traditi humilitati nostrae, Qui pluribus raise the issue of non-Catholic commentary material inserted into, and contaminating, Bibles.

==== Roman Index ====
On January 25, 1896, Leo XIII issued new rules for the Roman Index with the Apostolic constitution Officiorum ac Munerum. It was published on January 25, 1897. It generally contained some more relaxed rules and no longer automatically included all the books written by Protestants. It namely states:

CHAPTER I. Of the Prohibited Books of Apostates, Heretics, Schismatics, and Other Writers

1. All books condemned before the year 1600 by the Sovereign Pontiffs, or by Ecumenical Councils, and which are not recorded in the new Index, must be considered as condemned in the same manner that have formerly been, with the exception of such as are presently permitted by General Decrees. 2. The books of apostates, heretics, schismatics, and all writers whatsoever, defending heresy or schism, or in any way attacking the foundations of Religion, are altogether prohibited. 3. Moreover, the books of non-Catholics, ex professo treating of Religion, are prohibited, unless they clearly contain nothing contrary to Catholic Faith. 4. The books of the above-mentioned writers, not treating ex professo of Religion, but only touching incidentally upon the Truths of Faith, are not to be considered as prohibited by Ecclesiastical Law unless proscribed by special Decree.

CHAPTER II. Of Editions of the Original Text of Holy Scripture and of Versions not in the Vernacular

5. Editions of the Original Text and of the ancient Catholic versions of Holy Scripture, as well as those of the Eastern Church, if published by non-Catholics, even though apparently edited in a faithful and complete manner, are allowed only to those engaged in Theological and Biblical Studies, provided also that the Dogma of Catholic Faith are not impugned in the Prolegomena or Annotations. 6. In the same manner and under the same conditions, other versions of the Holy Bible published by non-Catholics, whether in Latin or in any other dead language, are permitted.

== 20th century ==
=== Greece ===
In 1901, a series of riots in Athens over the publication of a Gospel in modern spoken Greek in a newspaper culminated in 8 deaths. The Greek Orthodox Church reacted by banning any translation of the Bible into any form of modern demotic Greek, and by forbidding the employment of demoticist teachers.

=== Nazi Germany ===
In late August 1933, authorities used 25 trucks to transport about 70 tonnes of Watch Tower literature and Bibles to the city's outskirts and publicly burned them as part of a larger program of Persecution of Jehovah's Witnesses in Nazi Germany. Later on, in July 1935, state governments were instructed in July 1935 to confiscate all Watch Tower Society publications, including Bibles.

On November 9 and 10, 1938, thousands of Hebrew Bibles were burned in multiple communities in Germany as part of a program of persecution against Jews.

=== Canada ===
In 1955, police seized Bibles and other literature when raiding a house while Jehovah's Witnesses were worshiping there. The Jehovah's Witnesses successfully sued in response.

=== China ===
When the economic reforms implemented by Deng Xiaoping created greater openness to the West, Christians of various affiliations began smuggling Bibles and Christian literature into China. (Note: In 1981 the Bible smuggling operation Open Doors launched an operation called Project Pearl to deliver 1,000,000 Bibles in a single night to a beach in the village of Gezhou) The CCP viewed the recipients of those Bibles as engaging in illegal activity in violation of the principle of not accepting aid from Western sources.

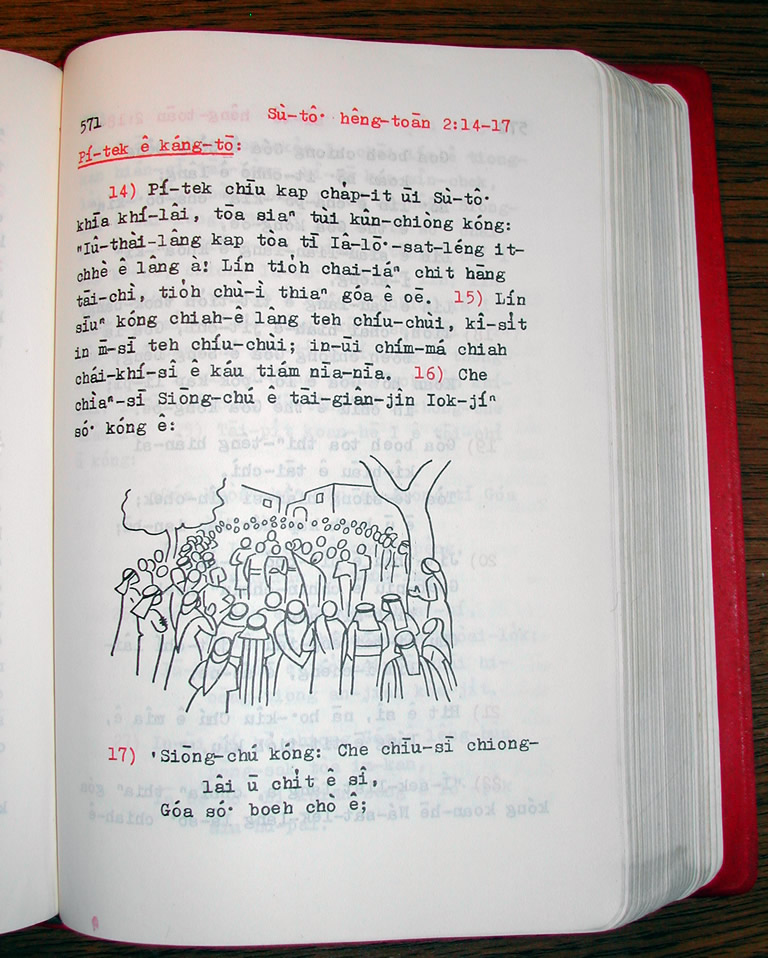
The 1973 Ko-Tân Colloquial Taiwanese Version New Testament, confiscated in 1975. It is open to Acts 2:14–17

=== Taiwan ===
For two years in the 1950s, churches were banned by the pre-democracy KMT regime from using Chinese Bibles written with Latin letters instead of Chinese characters. The ban was lifted with an encouragement to use Chinese characters. A 1973 Taiwanese translation of the New Testament was the product of cooperation between Protestants and Catholics. It was confiscated in 1975, also for using Latin letters.

=== Russia ===
In Russia, the activities of the Bible Society in Russia were greatly limited after Czar Nicholas I placed the society under the control of Orthodox church authorities. Following the 1917 Bolshevik Revolution, no Bibles were published until 1956, and even then, the circulation was limited until the 1990s.

=== Soviet Union ===
Aldis Purs, (Note: Aldis Purs faculty page at the University of Washington Department of Scandinavian Studies) wrote that in the Estonian Soviet Socialist Republic as well as the Latvian Socialist Soviet Republic, some evangelical Christian clergy attempted to resist the Soviet policy of state atheism by engaging in anti-regime activities such as Bible smuggling.

The Marxist–Leninist atheistic and antireligious legislation of the Soviet Union "discouraged religious activity to the point that it was essentially forced out of public life." A team led by Ken Howard engaged in Bible smuggling into the USSR and later, published copies of the Bible through screen-printing methods "using fabric smuggled in as curtain material or worn as petticoats, [which] allowed pages to be printed without being noticed." Seventy-five operations were established throughout the USSR, with more than one million pages being printed. In 2021, the Museum of the Bible in Washington, D.C. erected an exhibit on this Bible smuggling and screen-printing activity of Ken Howard and his team.

=== Singapore ===
In February 1995, Singapore police seized Bibles during a raid and arrested 69 Jehovah's Witnesses, many of whom went to prison. In March 1995, 74-year-old Yu Nguk Ding was arrested for carrying two "undesirable publications", one of them a Bible printed by the Watch Tower Society.

== 21st century ==
=== Islamic states ===
In many Muslim states, such as Afghanistan, Brunei, Saudi Arabia, and Yemen, access to the Bible, especially in the official language of the nation, can result in punishment. Distributing Bibles with the intent to convert Muslims to Christianity is illegal in many of these nations.

==== Saudi Arabia ====
In Saudi Arabia, proselytizing by non-Muslims, including the distribution of non-Muslim religious materials such as Bibles, is illegal. Under Saudi law, conversion by a Muslim to another religion is considered apostasy, a crime punishable by death.

==== Afghanistan ====
Bibles are not sold publicly. Converting to Christianity is viewed as a serious offense, potentially punishable by death. Islamic laws related to Christianity are enforced by the Taliban-led government, local community members, and the offender's family.

==== Libya ====
Importing and distributing Bibles is illegal, as is evangelism.

==== Malaysia ====
The Prime Minister clarified in April 2005 that there was no ban on Bibles translated into Malay, although they are required to be stamped with a disclaimer reading "Not for Muslims". The word translated in English as "God" is translated as "Allah" in some Malay Bibles, which is illegal as non-Muslims are prohibited from using the term "Allah." In March 2010, the Malaysian Home Ministry seized 30,000 Malay-language Bibles from a port in Kuching, Sarawak.

A lawsuit was filed by the Roman Catholic Archdiocese of Kuala Lumpur against the Government of Malaysia at the High Court of Malaya to seek declaratory relief that the word "Allah" should not be exclusive to Islam. However, in 2014, the Federal Court of Malaysia ruled that non-Muslims could not use the term "Allah", and 321 Bibles were subsequently seized.

==== Maldives ====
According to the UK government, it is an offense to import Bibles into the Maldives due to local Islamic religious laws.

==== Sudan ====
It is illegal to own a Bible in Sudan.

=== United States of America ===
==== U.S. military ====
In 2009, the U.S. military confiscated and destroyed Bibles in the possession of U.S. Army Chaplains at a US air base in Bagram, Afghanistan. The texts, written in Pashto and Dari, were intended to be distributed among the locals with the intent to convert, according to footage obtained and broadcast by Al Jazeera. Under U.S. military regulations, "proselytizing of any religion, faith or practice" is explicitly forbidden.

==== U.S. schools ====
The restriction of religious texts in U.S. public schools, including the Bible, was referred to by some sources as a "Bible ban".

On June 2, 2023, the Davis School District in Utah banned the Bible in elementary and middle schools due to "vulgarity or violence" inappropriate for the age group. The district reversed the decision on June 21.

=== Russia ===
In 2015, Russia banned the importation of the Jehovah's Witnesses' New World Translation of the Holy Scriptures. On May 5, 2015, customs authorities in Russia seized a shipment of religious literature containing Ossetian-language Bibles published by Jehovah's Witnesses. Russian customs officials in the city of Vyborg held up a shipment of 2,013 Russian-language copies of Bibles on July 13, 2015. Customs authorities confiscated three of the Bibles, sent them to an "expert" to study the Bibles to determine whether they contained "extremist" language, and impounded the rest of the shipment.

=== China ===
The state-owned Amity Press is the only publisher allowed to print Bibles in China that are not for export. The quantity printed is restricted, and the sale or distribution of Bibles is limited to officially sanctioned churches, with online sales having been cracked down upon as recently as 2018.

The Associated Press reported in September 2018 that the current suppression program in China includes the burning of Bibles.

=== Singapore ===
Singapore has banned Bibles and other literature published by the publishing arms of the Jehovah's Witnesses. A person in possession of banned literature can be fined up to S$2,000 (US$1,333) and jailed up to 12 months for a first conviction.

=== North Korea ===
Owning or distributing Bibles in North Korea is punishable by imprisonment.

=== Catholic ===
Today, Canon 825 governs Catholic Bible translations:

Books of the sacred scriptures cannot be published unless the Apostolic See or the conference of bishops has approved them. For the publication of their translations into the vernacular, it is also required that they be approved by the same authority and provided with necessary and sufficient annotations. With the permission of the Conference of Bishops, Catholic members of the Christian faithful in collaboration with separated brothers and sisters can prepare and publish translations of the sacred scriptures provided with appropriate annotations.

=== Bible smugglers ===
Modern censorship of the Bible has been met with resistance from groups such as Open Doors, Voice of the Martyrs, and World Help, which supply Bibles for smuggling or smuggle the Bibles themselves into nations where the Bibles or their distribution are prohibited.

Individual Bible smugglers include Andrew van der Bijl, David Hathaway, and John White.
