= Bible translations into Italian =

Before the invention of printing, Bible books were translated into emerging Italian dialects in the XIII and XIV century. The whole Bible (Italian: Bibbia) has been translated into Italian many times since the first printed translation, the so-called Malermi Bible, by Nicolò Malermi in 1471.

The CEI Bible published by the Episcopal Conference of Italy (Conferenza Episcopale Italiana) is the official version of the Italian Catholic Church. Prior to the initial publication of the CEI edition in 1971, the most common Italian translation of the bible was that of Archbishop Antonio Martini, published from 1769 to 1781.

The 1607 Italian translation by Giovanni Diodati is the standard reference used in Italian Protestantism; a revised edition of this translation in modern Italian, Nuova Diodati, was published in 1991.

== Early translations ==
The first printed translation of the Bible into Italian was the so-called Malermi Bible, by Benedictine Camaldolese Nicolò Malermi in 1471 from the Latin version Vulgate, a revision of a pre-existing Tuscan-dialect manuscript to reflect the Venetian dialect. A different translation was also printed in Venice in the same year by Nicolas Jenson, but did not find favour. Other early Catholic translations into Italian were made by the Dominican Fra Zaccaria of Florence in 1542 (the New Testament only) and by Dominican Savonaralan Santi Marmochino in 1543 (complete Bible) influenced by Lorenzo Valla, Erasmus's Greek-influenced New Testament and Brucioli's Old Testament.

Protestant translations were made by Antonio Brucioli in 1530 (ostensibly based on the Greek and Hebrew but actually owing much to the Latin versions of Erasmus and Pagnini), and by Giovanni Diodati in 1607 who translated the Bible from Latin and Jewish documents; Diodati's version is the reference version for Italian Protestantism. This edition was revised in 1641, 1712, 1744, 1819 and 1821. A revised edition in modern Italian, Nuova Diodati, was published in 1991.

A translation produced by Benedictine prior Massimo Teofilo Masi in 1552 is sometimes claimed as a Protestant version: however Masi was acquitted of a heresy accusation and remained a monk in Italy till his death.

The most used Catholic Bible translation in Italian before the 1971 CEI edition was that of Archbishop Antonio Martini. It was published from 1769 to 1771 (New Testament) and 1776 to 1781 (Old Testament), and it was formally approved by the papacy. It consists of parallel columns of Latin Vulgate and Italian with long and detailed notes based mainly on the Church Fathers' writings. The translation is based on the Vulgate checked with the original Greek and Hebrew texts (Martini was assisted in interpreting the Old Testament by a rabbi). It also includes a list of the main textual variants for each book. In the 1870 edition, the notes were rewritten and shortened.

From 1858 to 1860 the Jewish Samuel David Luzzatto translated part of the Old Testament into Italian.

== Translations since the 20th century ==
Major Bible editions published since the 20th century include:

- la Riveduta of 1924 by the Waldesan Giovanni Luzzi, based on the Wescott-Hort text, revised in 1994 and in 2006 with the title Nuova riveduta;
- La Bibbia of Eusebio Tintori, 1931;
- La Sacra Bibbia edited by Giuseppe Ricciotti, 1955;
- La Sacra Bibbia edited by Pontifical Biblical Institute, 9 volumes, 1958;
- La Bibbia, Edizioni Paoline, 1958 (1968);
- La Bibbia of Jesuit Alberto Vaccari, 1958;
- La Bibbia edited by Fulvio Nardoni, 1960;
- Collana La Sacra Bibbia, Marietti 1947–1960, edited by Salvatore Garofalo, in many volumes;
- Traduzione del Nuovo Mondo delle Sacre Scritture, 1967;
- La Bibbia Concordata, 1968 Mondadori, an Interfaith edition edited by a group of Catholic, Jewish, Protestant and Orthodox scholars;
- La Sacra Bibbia edited by Enrico Galbiati, Angelo Penna and Piero Rossano. Utet 1963, 1964, 1973;
- La Sacra Bibbia (CEI edition), 1971 (1974);
- La Bibbia di Gerusalemme, 1974
- Bibbia TILC, an Interconfessional edition edited by Catholic and Protestant scholars in 1985;
- Nuovissima versione edited by Edizione Paoline in 1987;
- Traduzione del Nuovo Mondo delle Sacre Scritture, 1987, based on the English 1984 edition of the New World Translation of the Holy Scriptures. Produced and published by Jehovah's Witnesses;
- La Sacra Bibbia (second CEI edition), 2008;
- La Bibbia di Gerusalemme, 2009
- Traduzione del Nuovo Mondo delle Sacre Scritture (nwt), 2017, the Bible is based on the English 2013 revision of the New World Translation of the Holy Scriptures. Produced and published by Jehovah's Witnesses;
- Traduzione del Nuovo Mondo delle Sacre Scritture (edizione per lo studio) (nwtsty), 2018, this electronic-only Bible is based on English 2015 edition of the New World Translation of the Holy Scriptures (Study Edition). Produced and published by Jehovah's Witnesses.

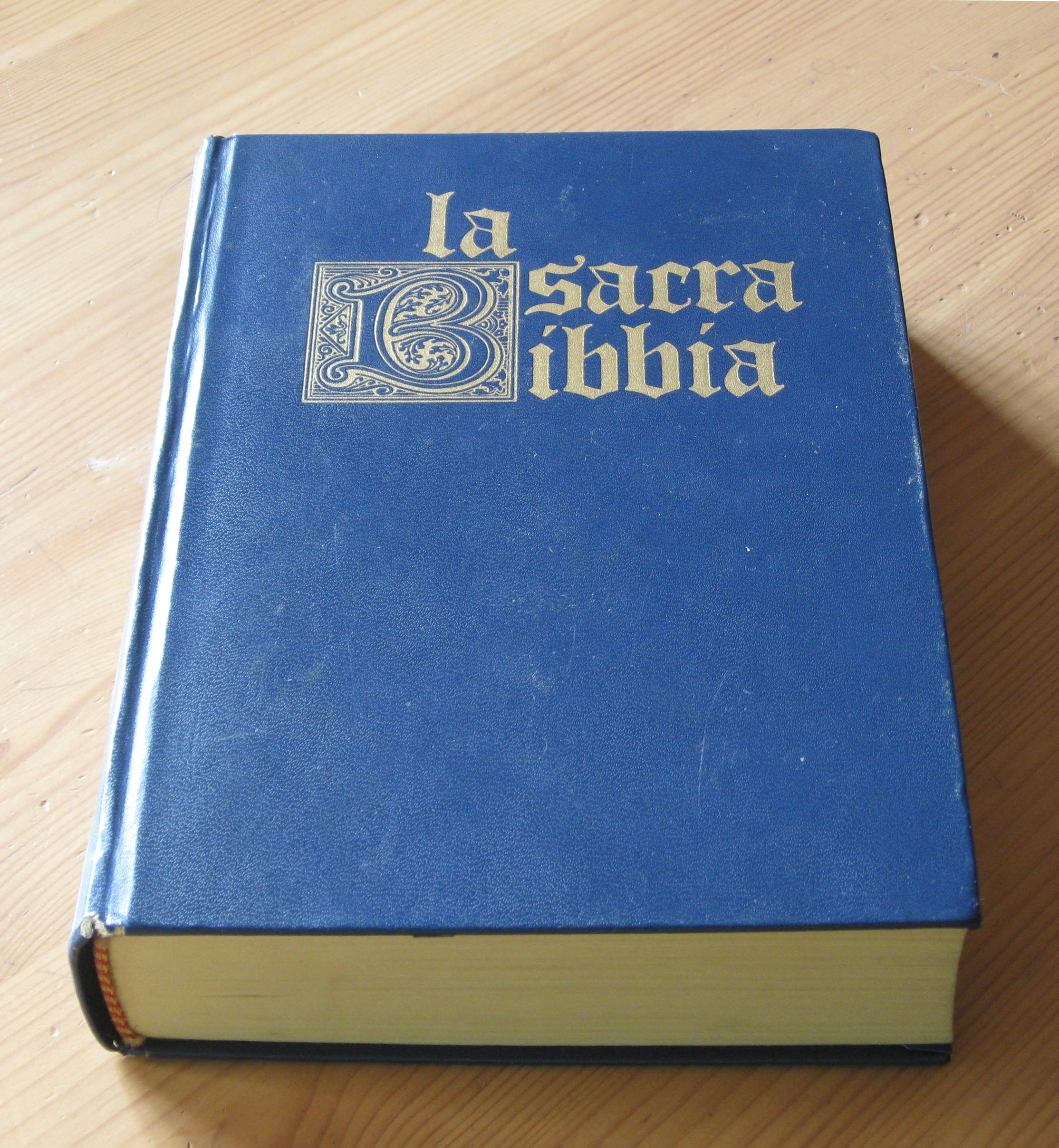
Bibbia CEI 1968

The Bible of CEI (Conferenza Episcopale Italiana) is the official version of the Italian Catholic Church. It was first printed in 1971 (editio princeps) as the work of only three translators in order to keep the text more consistent, and revised in 1974 (editio minor). A totally new version, published in 2008, after a revision of both the Testaments, that took into account newly discovered documents for the New Testament, was begun in 1997. Both the editions of La Bibbia di Gerusalemme (the Italian Jerusalem Bible) are notable for their introductions and footnotes, translated from the French original, but use texts from the CEI editions.

== Comparison ==
Translation	John (Giovanni) 3:16
Vulgate (Latin)	Sic enim Deus dilexit mundum, ut Filium suum unigenitum daret: ut omnis qui credit in eum, non pereat, sed habeat vitam aeternam.
Malermi (Venetian dialect, 1470s)	Táto amo dio el mondo che egli dette el suo unigenito figliolo: acio che ogni homo che crede ĩ lui nõ perisca: ma habia vita eterna.
Diodati (1607)	Percioché Iddio ha tanto amato il mondo, che ha dato il suo unigenito Figliuolo, accioché chiunque crede in lui, non perisca, ma habbia vita eterna.
Martini (1771)	Imperocché Dio ha talmente amato il mondo, che ha dato il Figliuolo suo unigenito, affinché chiunque in lui crede, non perisca; ma abbia la vita eterna
CEI (2008)	Dio infatti ha tanto amato il mondo da dare il Figlio unigenito, perché chiunque crede in lui non vada perduto, ma abbia la vita eterna
Traduzione del Nuovo Mondo (2017)	Infatti Dio ha tanto amato il mondo che ha dato il suo Figlio unigenito, affinché chiunque esercita fede in lui non sia distrutto ma abbia vita eterna.
