= Northern Homily Cycle =

The Northern Homily Cycle is a Middle English poem written c. 1315, likely by an Augustinian canon. The poem consists of approximately 20,000 rhyming, octosyllabic lines. It features a Middle English retelling of the Gospel in verse form, alongside stories to illustrate the points of the verses and messages. Many of these illustrative stories use familiar, agricultural examples, calling to mind Chaucer's tales. The poem underwent two major expansions, the first of which survives in two late fourteenth-century manuscripts in an East Midlands dialect, the second in two early fifteenth-century manuscripts in a Northern dialect.

The work is anonymous, however the text suggests that the author "wrote in his native dialect and was well versed in the lore of the north country."

Saara Nevanlinna has edited the second expansion of the Northern Homily Cycle found in London, British Library MS Cotton Tiberius E VII and London, British Library MS Harley 4196.

The Cycle can be found in the following manuscripts:

The original unexpanded NHC:

·Edinburgh, MS Royal College of Physicians.

·Oxford, Bodleian Library MS Ashmole 42 (S.C. 6923)

·Cambridge University Library MS Gg.V.3145

·Cambridge University Library MS Dd.I.146

·Lambeth Palace Library MS 260

·Minneapolis, Minnesota University Library MS Z 822 N81

·San Marino, CA, Huntington Library MS HM 129

·Cambridge University Library MS Addit. 8335 (olim Bute)

·London, British Library MS Addit. 30358 (fragment)

·London, British Library MS Addit. 38010

·Oxford, Bodleian Library MS 30516 (Eng. poet. c.3) (fragment)

·Oxford, Bodleian Library MS 3440 (Arch. Selden Supra 52) (exempla only)

·Oxford, Bodleian Library MS 31791 (Eng. poet. c.4) (exempla only)

·London, British Library MS Harley 2391 (exempla only)

·Porkington 10 MS (exempla only)

·London, British Library MS Lat. misc. b. 17 (fragment)

The first NHC expansion:

·Oxford, Bodleian Library MS Eng. Poet a. 1 (the Vernon Manuscript) ·London, British Library Add. 22283 (the Simeon Manuscript)

The second NHC expansion:

·London, British Library MS Cotton Tiberius E VII ·London, British Library MS Harley 4196
