= David Hathaway =

English evangelist

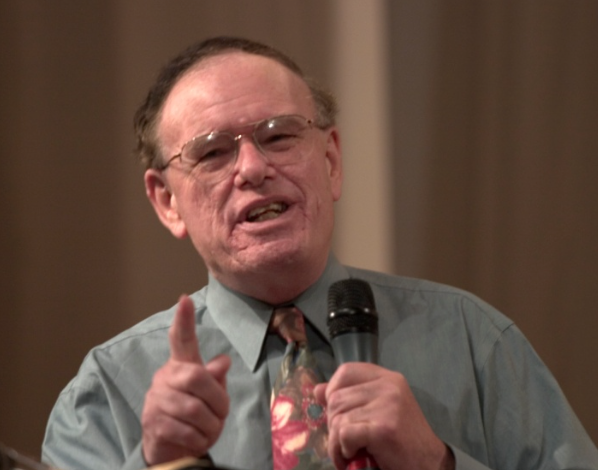
- David Hathaway

Personal life
- Born: April 17, 1932 (age 94) London, England, United Kingdom

Religious life
- Religion: Christian

David Gordon Hathaway (born 17 April 1932) is an English evangelist and founder and president of Eurovision Mission to Europe, as well as editorial director of Prophetic Vision magazine.

== Biography ==
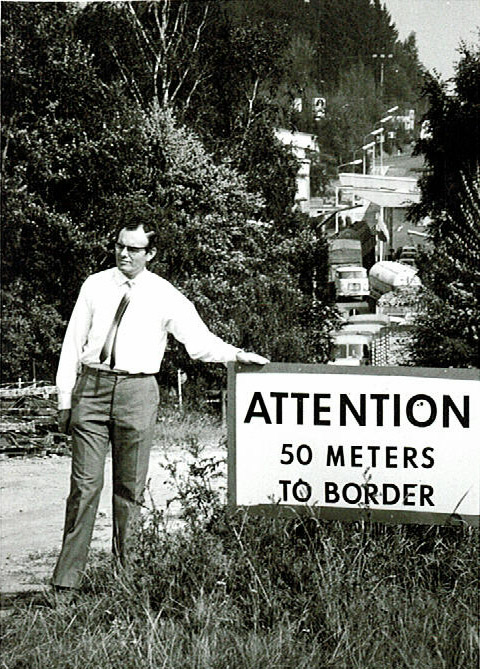
David Hathaway at the Border

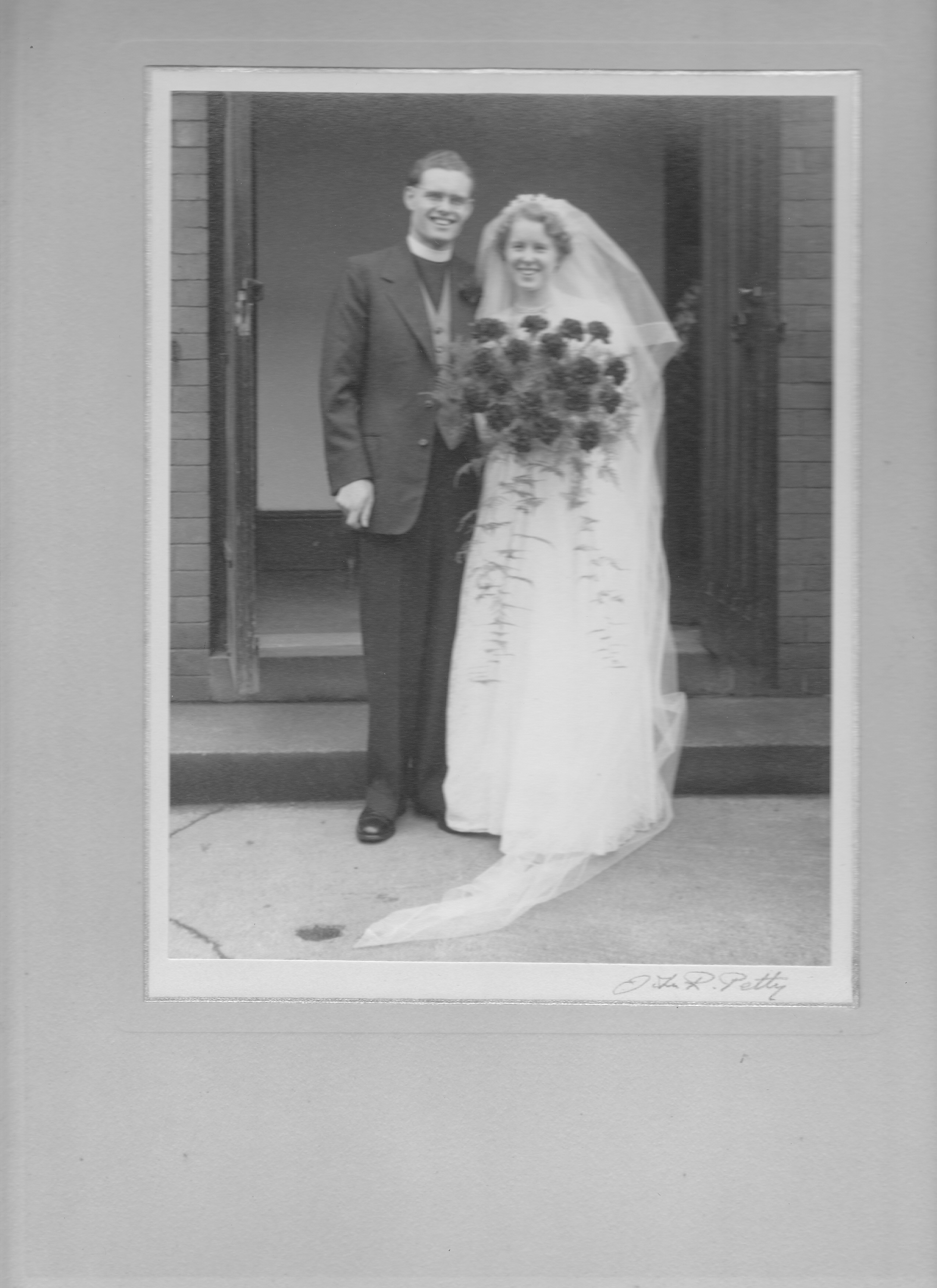
David Hathaway and Zena Margaret Anne Corps,1955

David Hathaway was born in London in 1932, and was the younger twin son in his family. His father, William George Hathaway, was born in 1890.

In 1950 David pastored his first church in Dorking in Surrey. He was full-time pastor and evangelist for 14 years in the UK from 1950 to 1964.

He became known after his pioneering 1961 expedition to Jerusalem by road, through the Iron Curtain countries. What he had done proved so popular, he began a tour company to take tourists on the overland route to the newly formed state of Israel through the communist countries.

In his book, Czechmate, David writes how he then became involved with underground Evangelism. In 1964, Hathaway informed Bass about his experience of delivering small numbers of Bibles and New Testaments which he brought on the request of friends in communist countries.

From 1961 to 1972 he smuggled quantities of Bibles into Soviet Union and Eastern Europe countries - and he delivered more than 150,000 copies. The biggest smuggling operation was planned for June 1972. The bus was loaded in Würzburg, West Germany, and next day it would cross into Czechoslovakia. On the border of Czechoslovakia, customs discovered the elaborately concealed secret compartment with 5000 Russian Bibles as well as some leaflets deemed to have political overtones. Hathaway was arrested on the border on 24 June and was accused of committing the offences of attempted sedition and attempted violation of customs regulations. Finally, arrested and tortured, he was sentenced to five years in prison and imprisoned in Czechoslovakia in 1972. He served less than one year of his sentence and in 1973 was released at the request of the then UK opposition leader, the former Prime Minister Harold Wilson.

In 1976 he organised the successful international campaign for the release of the pastor Georgi Vins from Kiev (Soviet Union), who was in a prison for his faith.

During the 1980s, Hathaway continued to travel all over Europe: Romania, Bulgaria, Hungary, even back into Czechoslovakia. In 1985 he held a series of meetings in Hungary; he got permission to minister in Catholic Churches. In the end of the 1980s he began to openly hold services and conferences in the Eastern Bloc countries. When the communist Eastern Bloc countries collapsed, in the 1990s he continued his work. In 1995, Hathaway launched his Prophetic Vision magazine.

In recent years Hathaway has been working in Israel to help Holocaust survivors from the Russian and former Eastern Bloc countries, both spiritually and materially.

== Personal life ==
Hathaway married Zena Margaret Anne Corps on 27 April 1955. Zena soon began to help her husband in his evangelistic efforts and became part of his evangelistic team. She died on 19 December 2014.

David Hathaway has three daughters, Carol and Sharon (twins born in 1956) and Mandy (1968), 5 grandchildren, 3 great-grandsons and 3 great granddaughters.

== Bibliography ==
- Czech Mate. Old Tappan, NJ: F. H. Revell Co. 1974. ISBN 0800707427.
- Why Siberia? God Chose Siberia to Demonstrate that Miracles Happen Today. EuroVision Publications. 1995. ISBN 9780952513209.
