= Officiorum ac Munerum =

Apostolic Constitution by Pope Leo XIII

Officiorum ac Munerum was an Apostolic Constitution issued by Pope Leo XIII on 25 January 1897. It was a major revision of the Index Librorum Prohibitorum, a list of books prohibited by the Catholic Church. Along with the 18th century Sollicita ac Provida, it forms the Leonine code.

== History ==
In 1753 Pope Benedict XIV issued the bull "Sollicita ac Provida" which uniformly regulated the process for conducting cases concerning literary productions. Benedict stated that his reason for publishing this constitution was the many unjust complaints against the prohibition of books as well as against the Index. During the Vatican Council, great efforts were made, especially on the part of the French and Germany bishops, to induce the assembled Fathers to mitigate the ecclesiastical laws relating to censorship, but before this question could be discussed, the council was dissolved.

Leo XIII took it upon himself to reorganize the ecclesiastical legislation in this respect, which he accomplished by the Constitution, "Officiorem ac Munerum". Since that time, for all literary matters, for censorship and prohibition of books, Of former enactments, the Bull "Sollicita ac Provida" alone has been retained; together with the new Bull, "Officiorem ac Munerum" it forms the first and general part of the Leonine Code, whereas the second and larger, but not therefore more important, part comprises the special, alphabetically arranged catalog of books forbidden by particular decrees since 1600.

== See also ==
- Index Librorum Prohibitorum
