= Antonio Martini =

Italian biblical scholar and Archbishop of Florence

- Archbishop of Florence
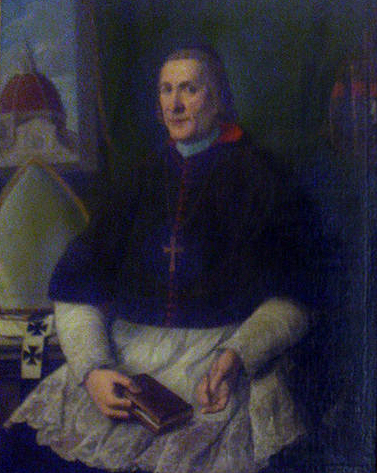
- Portrait of Antonio Martini, Town Hall of Prato
- Church: Catholic Church
- Installed: 17 July 1781
- Term ended: 31 December 1809
- Predecessor: Francesco Gaetano Incontri
- Successor: Pietro Francesco Morali

Personal details
- Born: 20 April 1720 Prato, Grand Duchy of Tuscany
- Died: 31 December 1809 (aged 89) Florence, First French Empire

Antonio Martini (b. in Prato in Tuscany, 20 April 1720; d. in Florence, 31 December 1809) was an Italian biblical scholar and Archbishop of Florence. His translation of the Bible in Italian, formally approved by the papacy, was widely used in Italy for about two centuries.

== Life ==
Having received holy Orders, he was appointed director of the Superga College at Turin. Cardinal Carlo Vittorio Amedeo delle Lanze, knowing that Pope Benedict XIV desired a good version of the Bible in the contemporary Tuscan language, urged Martini to undertake the work.

He began a translation of the New Testament but found the work with his duties in the Superga beyond his physical strength. He accordingly resigned the directorship and accepted from the King Charles Emmanuel III of Sardinia a state councillorship together with a pension. In spite of some discouragement upon the decease of Benedict XIV, Martini persevered, completing the publication of the New Testament in 1771. In his work upon the Hebrew text of the Old Testament, which followed, he was assisted by the rabbi Terni, a Jewish scholar.

The whole work was approved, and Martini was personally commended by Pope Pius VI, who made him archbishop of Florence in 1781. As archbishop, he succeeded in partly foiling an attempt to publish a garbled edition of his work, and a third authorized edition issued from Archepiscopal Press of Florence in 1782-92.

== See also ==
- Bible translations (Italian)
