= World Help =

- Founded: 1991
- Founder: Vernon Brewer
- Type: Faith-based 501(c)(3) organization
- Purpose: Meeting physical and spiritual needs in impoverished communities
- Location: Forest, Virginia, U.S.
- Region served: 70 countries.
- Method: Aid and relief Community development Sustainability and education Bible distribution Church planting Spiritual programs
- Revenue: US$35,371,087 (2017).
- Website: www.worldhelp.net

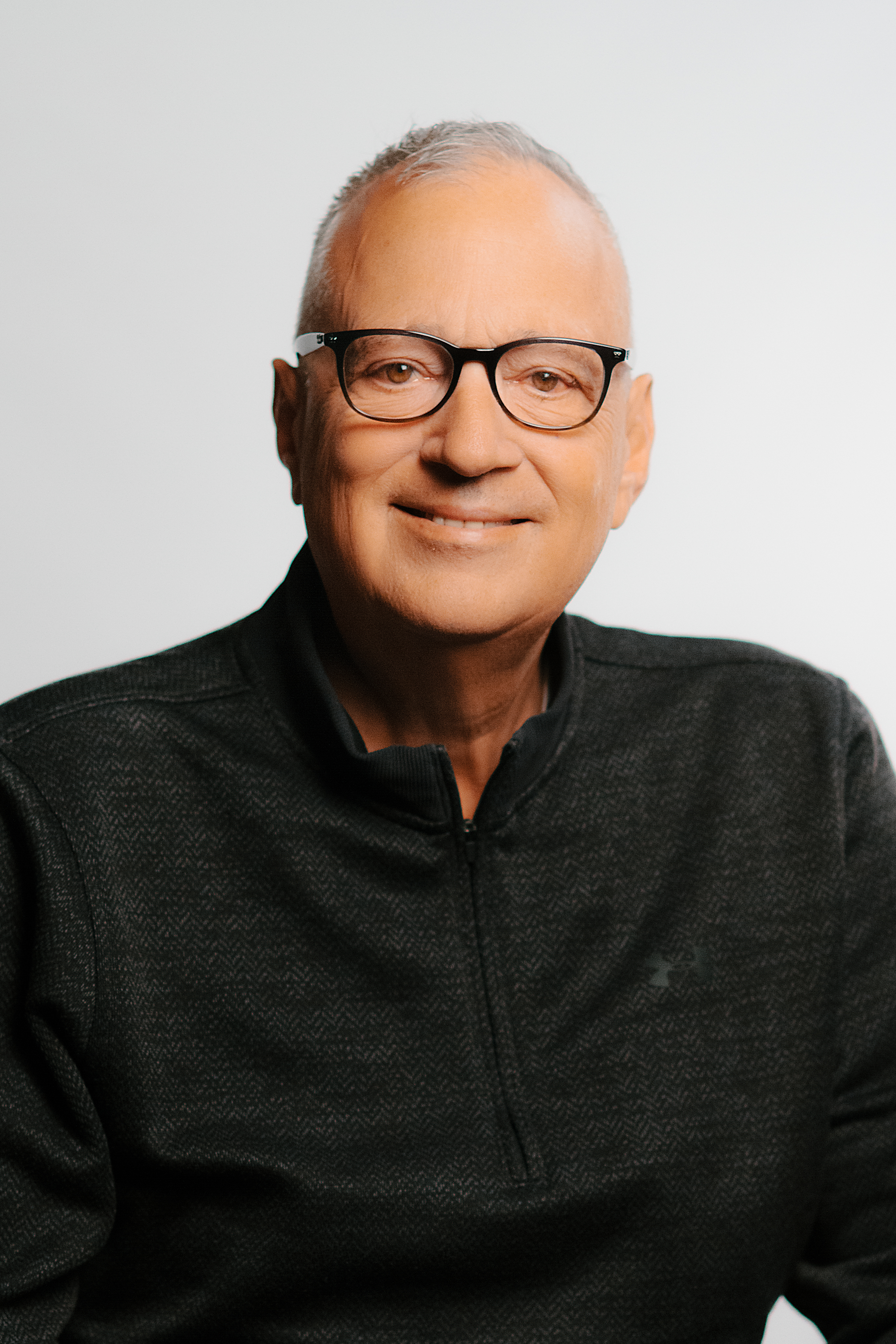
Vernon Brewer, Founder and President of World Help

World Help is a Christian humanitarian aid organization that provides help to people in impoverished communities around the world. The organization was founded in 1991 by Vernon Brewer, who had previously served as dean of students and vice president of student development at Liberty University. The organization is involved in “child advocacy, humanitarian aid, Bible distribution, and church planting” as well as child sponsorship. Brewer's daughter, Noel Yeatts, took over the position of president in the spring of 2018.

World Help is also known for its Children of the World International Children's Choir that travels around the United States, raising awareness for child sponsorship and other humanitarian aid opportunities such as refugee relief.

== Ongoing projects ==
World Help has many different types of programs around the world including humanitarian aid and disaster relief, Bible distribution, child sponsorship, church planting, and clean water projects.

=== Disaster relief and humanitarian aid ===
Crisis relief makes up a major part of World Help's global work, and the organization has played a role in delivering aid during many recent humanitarian disasters. After a 7.3-magnitude earthquake devastated the area surrounding Kathmandu, Nepal, World Help was listed among 10 trusted charities responding in the aftermath. In 2017, the organization providing relief to those affected by Hurricane Irma and in 2018 to the survivors of the deadly earthquake and tsunami in Indonesia.

The organization also sent food, medical aid, personal hygiene kits, and clothing in response to the Fuego volcano eruption in Guatemala that left “hundreds injured, hundreds dead and nearly two million others facing devastation” in June 2018. World Help had been working for more than a decade in the region, which allowed them to respond almost immediately to the crisis. Examples of World Help's ongoing work in Guatemala include partnering with donors to provide clean water wells and medical equipment and partnering with another Virginia charity, God's Pit Crew, to deliver “blessing buckets” to families living in poverty. Each bucket is “designed for families of five and they contain 23 items – ranging from toothpaste and blankets to crayons and vitamins”.

In addition to responding to natural disasters, World Help has also provided relief to those affected man-made disasters and the global refugee crisis. Starting in 2011, the organization began “actively working with Syrian refugees,” particularly during the siege of Aleppo. In April 2018, the organization provided food, medicine, and clean water to survivors of the deadly Douma chemical attack in Eastern Ghouta, Syria. They also distribute “essentials, including towels, diapers, hygiene kits, nonperishable food items, winter coats and space heaters” to refugees who are living in displacement camps along the Jordan-Syria border. In South America, World Help's crisis relief operations have recently focused on Venezuela where ongoing political and economic conflict have led to a “severe hunger crisis” and caused more than 3 million Venezuelans to flee the country. Although Venezuela's president, Nicolás Maduro officially refused allowing humanitarian aid into the country, World Help found a way to covertly transport “containers of food and medical supplies into the capital city”.

=== Bible distribution ===
As a Christian organization, World Help also participates in distributing Bibles around the world. They have been recognized most notably for their work of secretly getting Bibles and “Bible college curriculum for training church planters and future pastors” into the closed country of North Korea. In 2017, they set a goal of delivering 100,000 Bibles into the country by the end of the year. Brewer has personally traveled inside North Korea and the Korean Demilitarized Zone (DMZ) and has been questioned for his perspective on recent U.S.-North Korea peace talks. In 2018, Brewer joined dozens of other Christians leaders across the U.S. in a nationwide call for prayer that a peaceful resolution could be established between America and North Korea. He has also contributed to Fox News on the subject of Christian persecution and human rights abuses in North Korea.

=== Freedom homes ===
Another outreach of the organization is to help women and girls who have been forced into the global sex industry. As part of National Slavery and Human Trafficking Prevention Month in 2017, World Help dedicated a home in Pattaya, Thailand to offer victims a “safe place to live, meals, education, vocational training, trauma counseling, and medical care.” Pattaya is home to an estimated 50,000 sex workers. Two years later, also during Human Trafficking Awareness Month, the organization raised money to add a baking school to the Pattaya home so the women living there could learn a trade and avoid pressure to return to the streets. World Help's local missionary partners in Thailand “spend countless hours in bars all year round” and host “Night of Freedom” parties to tell local sex workers about the opportunity to escape the sex industry and come live at the freedom home instead. World Help also has a freedom home in India specifically targeted toward reaching girls in the Banchara community, a group where tradition often forces daughters into prostitution to pay for their brothers’ marriage dowries.

== Children of the World Choir ==
The Children of the World International Children's Choir is made up of boys and girls from Nepal, Uganda, and the Philippines between the ages of 9 and 12. The choir has been touring for more than 20 years. After each tour, “the children return to their home countries where their education up to the university level is sponsored by World Help”. While on the road, the children are homeschooled and taught English by chaperones from their respective countries. The purpose of the choir is to use “song, dance, and other creative mediums to tell forgotten stories of disadvantaged youth”.

== Financials ==
According to the charity assessment organization Charity Navigator, World Help commits 82 percent of revenue to international programs, 11.5 percent to administration, and 6.3 percent to fundraising. They have been accredited by the Evangelical Council for Financial Accountability since 1993 and have been awarded the gold-level Seal of Transparency by GuideStar. World Help submits itself annually to review by independent auditor CapinCrouse
