= Nicolò Malermi =

Italian biblical scholar (c.1422–1481)

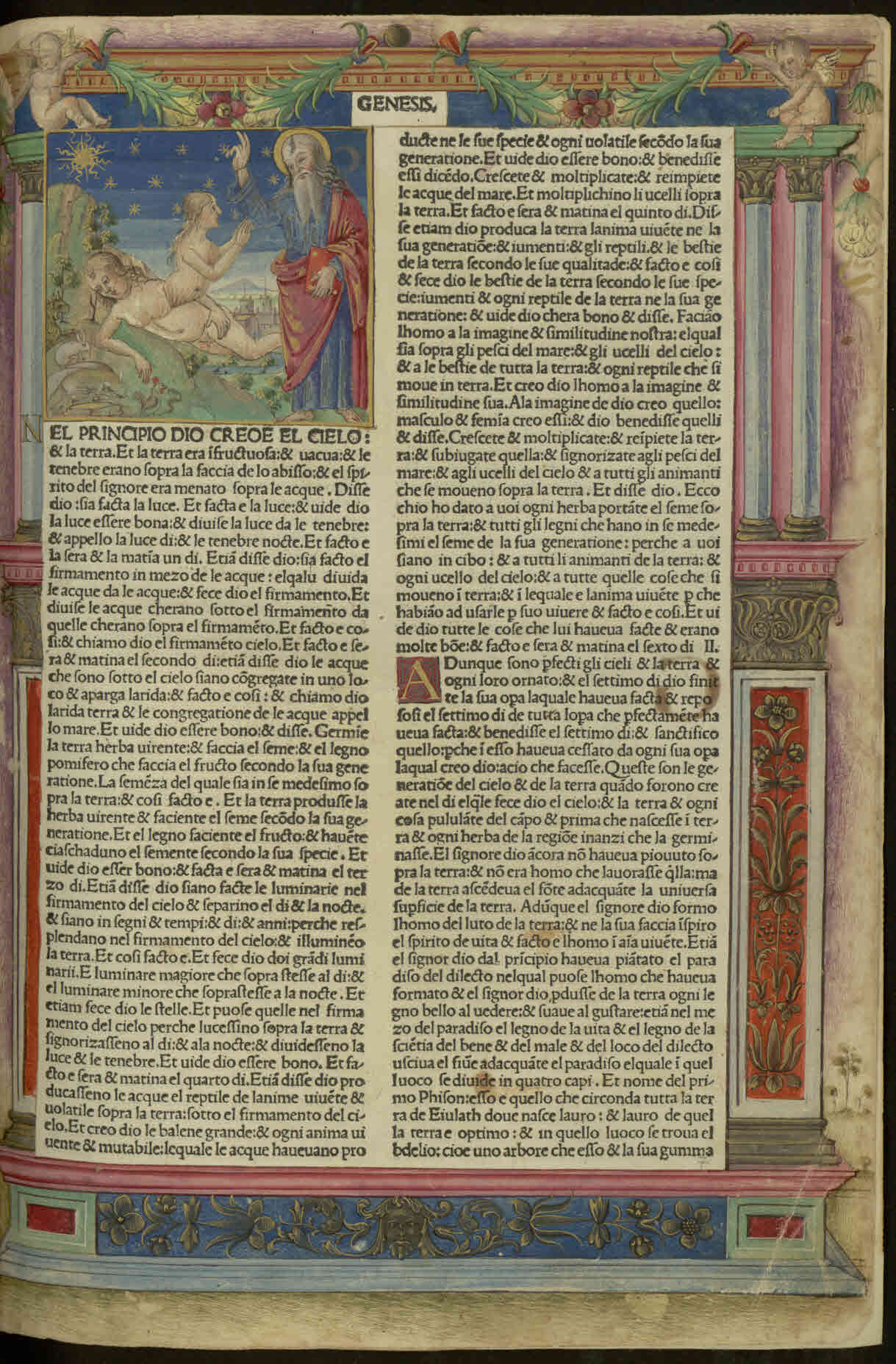
Manerbi - Bibbia, nel anno del signore MCCCCLXXXVII a di ultimo de octobre

Nicolò Malermi (or Malerbi, or Manerbi; c.1422–1481) was an Italian biblical scholar credited as the first translator of the Bible from Latin into the Italian language.

== Life ==
Malermi was born in the Republic of Venice in about 1422. He joined the Benedictine Camaldolese order in about 1470, quite late in his life, when he was around 48 years old. The next year, he translated the Bible into Italian, in the hermitage of San Matteo, on a little island near Murano in the Venetian lagoon. In 1477 he was appointed abbot of San Michele di Leme near Lim Bay in present-day Croatia, an area then under Venetian rule. The monastery is located between towns of Poreč (Parenzo) and Rovinj (Rovigno) and had been placed under the primacy of San Michele in Isola in 1394.

Three years later, in 1480, Malermi was living in s Camaldolese monastery in Classe, near Ravenna, a historically important town on Italy's Adriatic coast which was also controlled by Venice in the 15th century. The following year, the year of his death, he returned to Venice and became the superior of San Michele in Isola on the Isola di San Michele.

Malermi is remembered for his 1471 translation of the bible, the so-called Malermi Bible, which included deuterocanonical books of the Old Testament. It was the first printed translation of the Bible in Italian, based on the Latin text. The author (and his collaborators, Lorenzo da Venezia and Girolamo Squarciafico) completed the translation in eight months, in some cases using and adapting some previous fourteenth-century translations, even if at the expense of literary quality. Malermi also wrote a history (now lost) of the Murano monastery and translated into Italian The Lives of All Saints (some composed by Malermi, some in collaboration with Girolamo Squarciafico; Venice, 1475).

Malermi died in 1481 in Venice. An 18th-century portrait of Malermi is at the Biblioteca Classense in Ravenna.

There is digital version of his Bible, from the 1490 edition of Venice preserved in the Bodleian Library, Oxford, England (Douce 244): Malermi Bible 1490 Venice. This is an illustrated edition which contains a woodcut of the translator at work in his cell (frame 18).
