= Haydock (surname) =

Haydock is a surname. Notable people with the surname include:

- Billy Haydock, English footballer
- Christopher Haydock, English politician
- Cuthbert Haydock (1684–1763), Catholic recusant priest
- Eric Haydock (1943–2019), English bassist, original member of the band The Hollies
- George Haydock (1556–1584), Catholic recusant priest and martyr
- George Leo Haydock (1774–1849), Catholic recusant priest and Bible scholar
- James Haydock (1764?–1809), Catholic recusant priest
- Jimmy Haydock (1872–1900), English footballer
- Margaret Haydock (1767?–1854), Catholic recusant nun
- Thomas Haydock(1772–1859), Catholic recusant publisher
- Tom Haydock (disambiguation), multiple people
