= Tom Haydock =

Tom Haydock may refer to:

- Tom Haydock (English footballer) (fl. 1890s), English footballer
- Tom Haydock (Scottish footballer) (1890–1918), Scottish footballer

== See also ==
- Thomas Haydock
- Haydock (surname)
