= Woman of the Apocalypse =

Figure described in Chapter 12 of the Book of Revelation

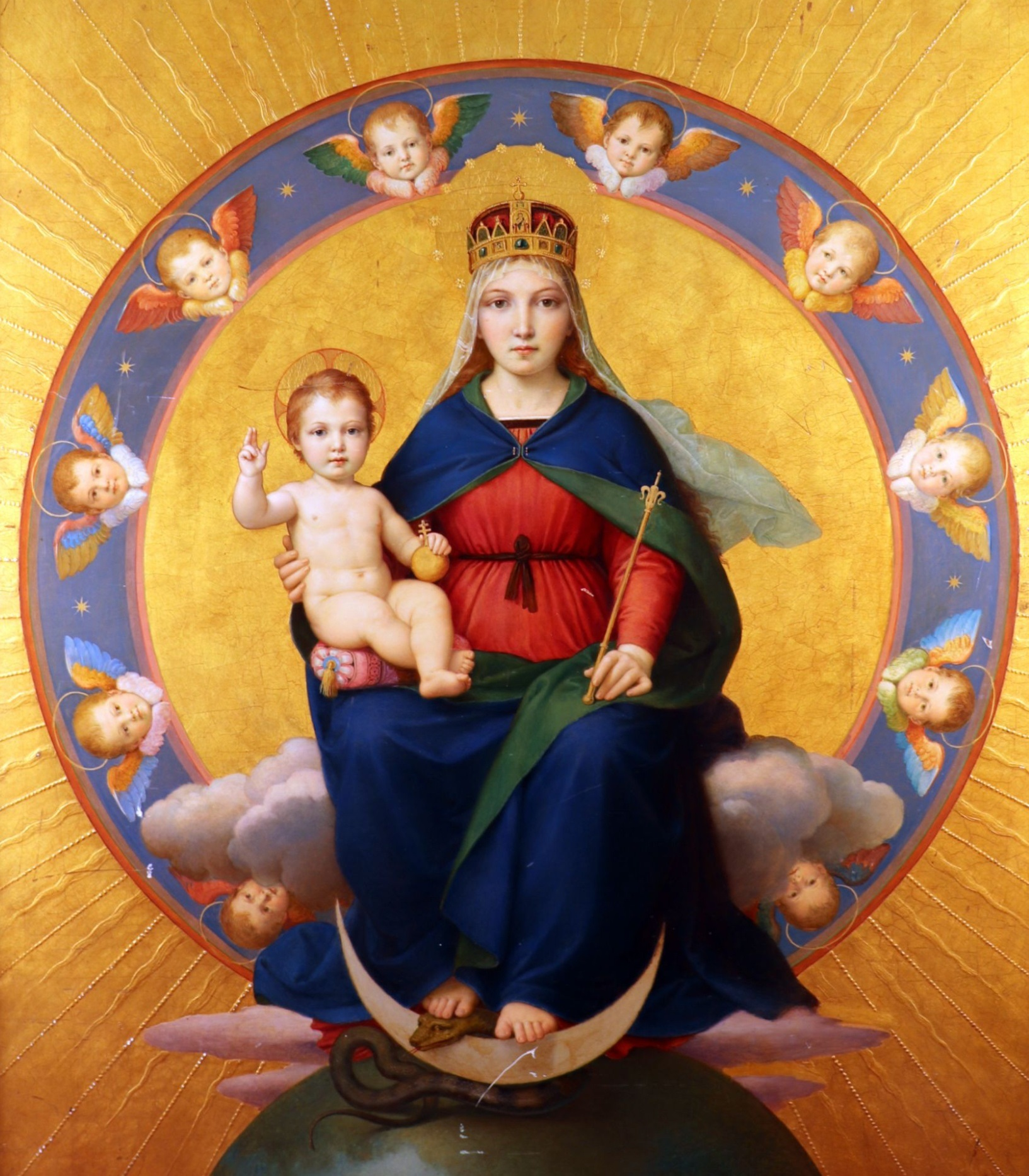
Woman clothed with the Sun or Woman of the Apocalypse – from the 12th chapter of the Book of Revelation – painting by Ferenc Szoldatits

The Woman of the Apocalypse (or the woman clothed with the sun, Greek: γυνὴ περιβεβλημένη τὸν ἥλιον; Latin: Mulier amicta sole) is a figure–often considered to be a reference to the Virgin Mary in Catholic theology–described in Chapter 12 of the Book of Revelation (written c. AD 95).

The woman gives birth to a male child who is threatened by a dragon, identified as the Devil and Satan, who intends to devour the child as soon as he is born. When the child is taken to heaven, the woman flees on eagle’s wings into the wilderness at a "place prepared of God" for 1,260 days. This leads to a "War in Heaven" in which the angels cast out the dragon. The dragon attacks the woman, but the woman escapes on her wings for "a time, times and a time and a half". The dragon then attacks her again with a flood of water from his mouth, which is subsequently swallowed by earth. Frustrated, the dragon initiates war on "the remnant of her seed", identified as the righteous followers of Christ. The Woman of the Apocalypse is widely identified as the Virgin Mary. Some Catholic commentaries, such as Thomas Haydock's Catholic Bible Commentary (1859), allow for the interpretation of the woman as either the Church or Mary. The commentary of the New American Bible states that "The woman adorned with the sun, the moon, and the stars (images taken from Genesis 37:9–10) symbolizes God’s people in the Old and the New Testament. The Israel of old gave birth to the Messiah (Rev 12:5) and then became the new Israel, the church, which suffers persecution by the dragon (Rev. 12:6, 13–17); cf. Is. 50:1; 66:7; Jer. 50:12."

The past president of the Catholic Biblical Association of America, Robert Karris in his Collegeville Bible Commentary on Revelation 12, believed that the woman clothed with the sun would directly remind the audience of the Roman story of the sun deity Apollo. In the myth, Python the serpent was seeking to kill Leto who was pregnant with Apollo, however Zeus would use the north winds to rescue Leto, by having her taken to an island. Bible scholar John H. Walton would instead recognize the myth of Artemis, who was a virgin that protected women giving birth. Statues would portray her as a queen of heaven, with the moon in the background of her three tiered crown, where she is also identified as the moon goddess and twin sister of Apollo. Walton notes that in other depictions, she adorns an elaborate necklace with 12 signs of the Zodiac.

Among Protestants, including particularly among those with more Reformed theology and Evangelicals, the Woman of the Apocalypse tends to be seen as the Church or Israel.

Arsène Heitz, one of the designers who submitted proposals for the flag of Europe and the European Union, suggested that the twelve stars in the current design is derived from the twelve stars above the Woman's head.

== Narrative ==
Revelation 12 describes "a woman clothed with the sun, and the moon under her feet, and upon her head a crown of twelve stars" (12:1). The woman is pregnant and about to give birth, "travailing in birth, and pained to be delivered" (12:2).

Then there is "a great red dragon, having seven heads and ten horns, and seven crowns upon his heads" (12:3) who is about to "devour her child as soon as it was born" (12:4). But her child is "caught up unto God" (12:5), and the woman herself is "fled into the wilderness, where she hath a place prepared of God, that they should feed her there a thousand two hundred and threescore days." (12:6)

Then there is a description of "War in Heaven" of the angels against the dragon, and "the great dragon was cast out, that old serpent, called the Devil, and Satan, which deceiveth the whole world: he was cast out into the earth, and his angels were cast out with him." (12:9)

The woman is again mentioned in 12:13, as she is persecuted by the dragon, and she escapes on her "two wings of a great eagle" (12:14). The dragon attempts to inundate her place of refuge, by "water as a flood" emerging from his mouth (12:15), but the flood is swallowed up by the earth (12:16), so the dragon went "to make war with the remnant of her seed, which keep the commandments of God, and have the testimony of Jesus Christ" (12:17).

== Interpretation as the Virgin Mary ==
=== History ===
The first ancient author to mention a Marian interpretation is Epiphanius, although he does not adhere to this perspective himself (Haer. 78.11: MG 42.716 C). This view may have been held by Tychonius (he heavily influenced Augustine), but he is ambiguous. Other early authors who held this view include the unknown author of the History of Joseph the Carpenter, Quodvultdeus (a disciple of Augustine), Cassiodorus (Complexiones in Apocalypsi, written c. 570 AD), and the Greek Father Oikoumenios (6th c.), with his contemporary Andreas of Caesarea criticising him for believing so. (Note: Oecumenius in his commentary states that the woman is the Theotokos and that she is present in heaven bodily and describes her as consubstantial with us (i.e. of the same human nature).(Suggit 2006, p. 107))

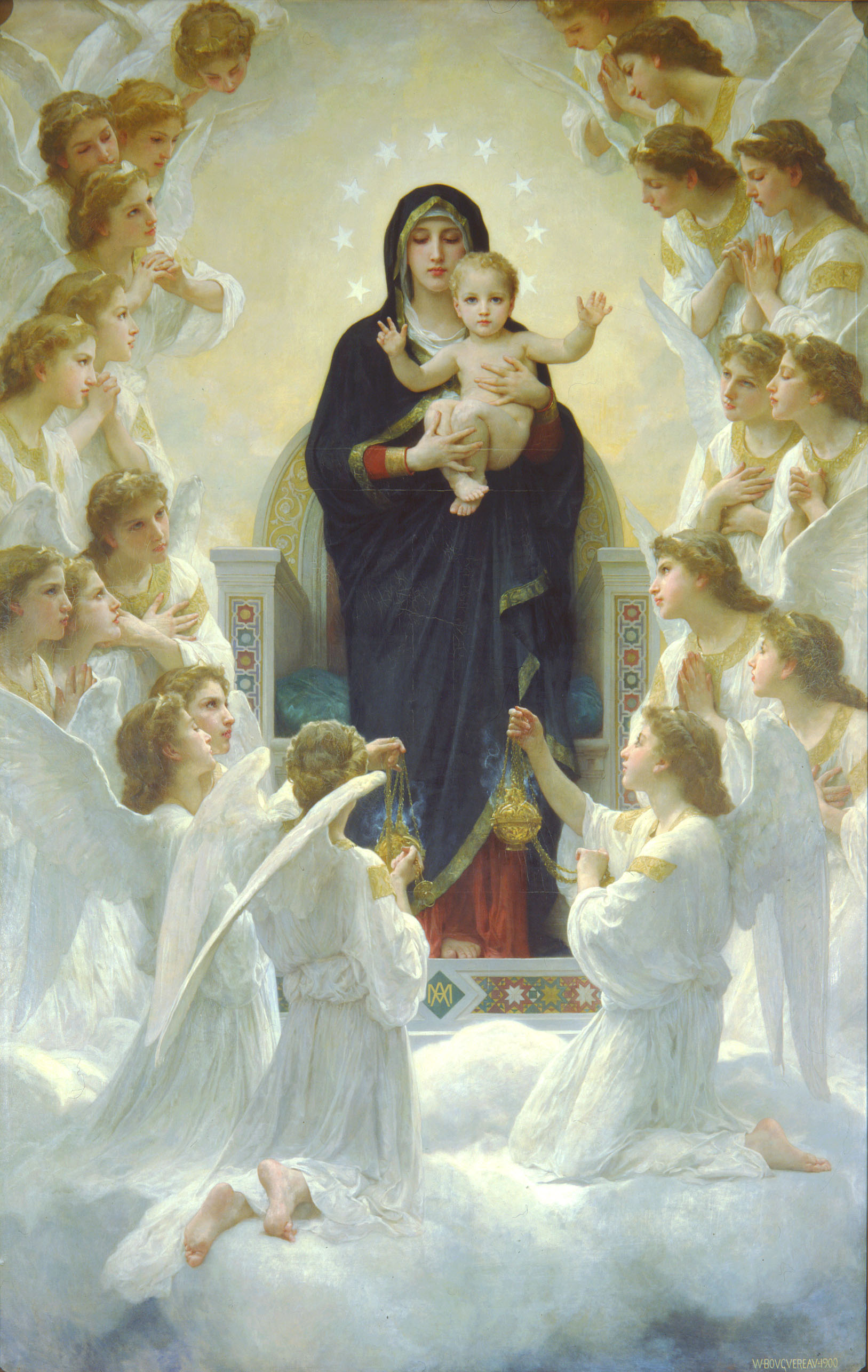
Regina Angelorum by William-Adolphe Bouguereau, depicting the Virgin and Child surrounded by angels.

In modern times, the Marian interpretation has been affirmed by Pope Pius X, Pope Pius XII, Pope Paul VI, and Pope John Paul II.

Theologians view the Woman of the apocalyse in Revelation 12:1–3 as a foresight to the Virgin Mary, both the mother of God and the mother of church; taking Revelation 12 as a reference to Mary, Israel, and the Church as a threefold symbolism through the Book of Isaiah and affirms Mary as the mother of Jesus Christ as the prophetic fulfilment described in Revelation 12 (cf. Isaiah 7:14, 26:17, 54:1, 66:7).

Pope Pius X explicitly identified the "woman" of the Revelation with the Virgin in his encyclical Ad diem illum. Pope Benedict XVI also made this identification several times, associating the "crown of twelve stars" with Mary's authority among the saints. The same did Pope Francis.

=== Theological interpretation ===
The woman's "male child" is a reference to Jesus (Revelation 12:5), since he is destined to "rule all nations with a rod of iron" (Revelation 12:5). The dragon trying to devour the woman's child at the moment of his birth (Revelation 12:4) is a reference to Herod the Great's attempt to kill the infant Jesus (Matthew 2:16). Through his death and resurrection and Ascension, Jesus "was snatched up to God and to his throne" (Revelation 12:5).

In the interpretation of Pius X (1904), the birth is not that of Jesus but "surely ours", (i.e. the Church Militant) "we who, being yet detained in exile, are still to be brought forth to the perfect love of God and eternal happiness". Pius XII (1950) makes explicit the reference to the Assumption of Mary. And John Paul II (1987) to the Protoevangelium interpretation of Genesis 3:15, and by extension the symbolic identification of the Woman with both Mary and Eve.

=== Veneration ===
Both Marian veneration and the interpretation of the Woman of the Apocalypse are recorded since at least the 4th century, but the specific veneration of Mary in this form becomes tangible only in the medieval period. Iconographically, Marian figures associated with the Revelation narrative are recognizable by the astronomical attributes, specifically her standing on a crescent moon, and the crown of twelve stars (while the description "clothed with the sun" is sometimes rendered by rays emanating from her figure).

Association of Mary with a single star is recorded from the early medieval period, in the hymn Ave Maris Stella.

Many depictions of Mary from the Gothic period (14th to 16th century) show her standing on a crescent moon inspired by the association of Mary with the woman of the Apocalypse. The motif became so popular in 15th-century Germany that pre-existing Madonna figures were refitted with a crescent (e.g. Madonna of Bad Doberan, c. 1300, refitted in the 15th century). The Virgin of Guadalupe was depicted as the Madonna of the Apocalypse since at least the 16th century.

The Madonna of the Apocalypse became associated with Our Lady of the Rosary, the "crown of twelve stars" being identified with a "rosary of twelve privileges" of Mary. The Virgin of the Rosary is frequently shown with the crown or halo of twelve stars (but not the crescent moon) in modern depictions (since the 19th century (Note: there are examples of Baroque-era predecessors of this iconographic tradition, e.g. Diego Velazquez, Immaculata conceptio (1618), Carlo Dolci, Madonna in Glory (1670).)). A notable example is the Virgin of the Rosary of Pompei.

An anecdote (first published in the 1980s) connects the design of the Flag of Europe (1955) to this aspect of Marian iconography. (Note: Arsène Heitz (1908–1989), one of the designers who had submitted proposals for the flag's design, in 1987, following the adoption of the flag by the EEC, laid claim such a religious inspiration. Heitz also made a connection to the date of the flag's adoption, 8 December 1955, coinciding with the Catholic Feast of the Immaculate Conception of the Blessed Virgin Mary. The French satirical magazine Le Canard enchaîné reacted to Heitz' statement with an article entitled L’Europe violée par la Sainte Vierge ("Europe Raped by the Blessed Virgin") in the 20 December 1989 edition. (Gialdino 2005, pp. 80–85).)

== Interpretation as the Church ==
One early writer interpreting the woman as the church is Hippolytus of Rome who states said interpretation in On Christ and Antichrist.

The Catholic Church recognizes the "woman" as part of the polyvalent symbolism that is found in the book in four referents: Israel, the Church, Eve, and Mary.

Commentators who adhere to Protestant eschatology sometimes identify the woman as the Church, and the man-child she gives birth to are the saints. According to this interpretation, Revelation 12:17 describes the remnant of the seed of the woman as those who keep the commandments of God, and have the testimony of Jesus Christ. The offspring of the Woman, the Woman's seed, then refers to the saints. The man child "who shall rule the nations with a rod of iron" is a symbol of the faithful members of the Church.

In Revelation 2:18–29, the Church in Thyatira is promised that the faithful shall rule the nations with a rod of iron. In Revelation 19:15 the same thing is stated of Jesus. In Galatians 4:26, Paul the Apostle refers to the "New Jerusalem" as "our mother", and in Revelation 21:2 and Ephesians 5:21–32 the New Jerusalem and the Church is portrayed as the Bride of Christ.

The Seventh-day Adventist Church identifies itself as the end-time "remnant church" described in Revelation 12:17.

The Church of Jesus Christ of Latter-day Saints also interprets the woman to be the Church, and the man-child to be the political kingdom that will grow out of the Church prior to or during the Second Coming of Christ; this interpretation arises from Joseph Smith's translation of the twelfth chapter of Revelation. Some in the church interpret the woman to be a symbol of the earth. Baptisms of fire and water being poured upon the earth and the sun clothing the earth daily are just a couple examples of this reference.

== Other interpretations ==
=== The Bahá'í Faith ===
The Bahá'í Faith interprets the woman as representing the religion of God as revealed within Islam, with the governments of the Persian Empire (the sun) and Ottoman Empire (the moon) under its influence "for the emblem of Persia is the sun and that of the Ottoman Empire is the crescent moon." They identify the crown of twelve stars on her head as the Twelve Imams of Islam who promoted the religion and were "the educators of the nation, and who shone as stars in the heaven of guidance." Bahá'í Faith recognizes the child she bears after a period of 1,260 days to rule all nations with a rod of iron to be the Báb, the forerunner of the Bahá'í Faith, who declared his mission in 1844 – the year 1260 in the Islamic lunar calendar.

=== The Nation of Israel ===
Dispensational premillennialists, and amillennialists who believe in multiple valid interpretations will often identify the woman as the nation of Israel. There are several reasons given to support this interpretation. The woman is said to be clothed with the sun, the moon under her feet, and twelve stars. These symbols are drawn from Genesis 37:9–11, in which Joseph has a dream of the Sun and Moon symbolizing his father and mother, and stars representing his eleven brothers, which bow down to him. The Old Testament's prophets referred to Israel as a "woman" (Isaiah 54:5–6; Jeremiah 4:31; Micah 4:9–10).

The woman flees into the wilderness where she is nourished for 1260 days, the equivalent of three and a half years or forty-two months (cf. Rev. 12:6). According to this interpretation, these terms are used prophetically in Scripture either for the first half or the last half of the "Seventieth Week of Daniel", in Daniel 9:24–27, a prophecy specifically addressed to Daniel and his people, Israel (Dan. 9:24).

In the latter part of the seventieth week, a remnant of Israel will flee into the wilderness to escape the persecution of Antichrist, who is called "the son of destruction", "the lawless one", and "whose coming is in accord with the activity of Satan" (2 Thess. 2:1–12; cf. Rev. 12:4,9). Jesus, in the Olivet Discourse, warned the people of this time which would occur just prior to His return to set up His earthly, Millennial kingdom (Matt. 24:15–22). Further, the archangel Michael is called the guardian over the sons of Israel in Dan. 12:1. And he will arise at that time of national Israel's tribulation (Dan. 12:1; cf. Rev. 12:7).

Amillennialist belief can also interpret this passage as the nation of Israel.

The remnant or sons of Israel is, in this understanding, the followers of Christ. The "Seventieth Week of Daniel", and prophecy of the Olivet Discourse, in this belief, are ascribed as concerning the first coming of Christ, the destruction of Jerusalem in 70 AD (during which enforced emperor worship occurred in the temple of Jerusalem, which was later almost totally destroyed, and many Jews were made slaves in distant lands resulting presumably in their remaining families not knowing what happened to them or where they were), and the establishment of Christ's Church, as it currently exists, both on earth and in heaven.

Lutheran scholar Craig Koester, for example, says, "The woman encompasses the story of Israel, from whom the Messiah was born, as well as the story of the church, which was persecuted after Jesus' death and resurrection... John's visionary account of the threat against the woman and the woman's preservation uses imagery that encompasses many moments in the story of God's people. This allows the story to apply to people in many times and places."

=== Astrological symbolism ===
Russian Orthodox theologian Sergei Bulgakov (1871–1944) in his interpretation of Revelation notes of the astronomical attributes of the woman in Babylonian, Persian, Greek, and Egyptian mythologies. He takes the crown of twelve stars as representing the Zodiac. In his interpretation, astronomical attributes of a pagan goddess are here "translated into the language of Christian theology and assume the new symbolism.

=== The Church of Jesus Christ of Latter-day Saints ===
In Joseph Smith's Inspired Translation of the King James Bible (JST), the woman is identified as "the church of God":

"And the woman fled into the wilderness, where she had a place prepared of God, that they should feed her there a thousand two hundred and threescore days. And there was war in heaven; Michael and his angels fought against the dragon; and the dragon and his angels fought against Michael; And the dragon prevailed not against Michael, neither the child, nor the woman which was the church of God, who had been delivered of her pains, and brought forth the kingdom of our God and his Christ. (Revelation 12:1–17 JST)

=== Christian Science ===
Science and Health with Key to the Scriptures (1875) written by Mary Baker Eddy, the founder of The First Church of Christ, Scientist, presents the woman in the Apocalypse as symbolizing "the spiritual idea of God; she illustrates the coincidence of God and man as the divine Principle and divine idea ... the spiritual idea of God's motherhood." The man child represents "Christ, God's idea, [which] will eventually rule all nations and peoples – imperatively, absolutely, finally – with divine Science [the Law of God]"

== See also ==
- Our Lady of Guadalupe – Marian apparitions in December 1531
- Whore of Babylon – Female figure and also place of evil mentioned in the Book of Revelation
