= Margaret Haydock =

Margaret Haydock (Sr. Stanislaus, O.S.A.; 1767? – 1854) was a Roman Catholic nun and teacher, whose life exemplified the plight of English Catholic nuns in exile on the Continent during the French Revolution.

== Family background ==
Margaret Haydock continued the long tradition of her family in standing firm for her Faith during the Penal Period against Catholics in England. Her ancestors include William Haydock, O. Cist. (1483?–1537) who suffered execution for his participation in the Pilgrimage of Grace, and Blessed George Haydock (1556–1584) executed for serving as a priest. Her parents were George Haydock and his second wife, Anne (née Cottam). Along with her brothers James Haydock and George Leo Haydock, both priests, and Thomas Haydock, a noted Catholic publisher, she was a member of a remarkable generation that made an extraordinary contribution to the preservation of Catholicism in England.

== Career as a Roman Catholic nun ==
Little is known about Margaret Haydock's early life. She felt the same call to a religious vocation as her brothers James and George Leo. Since Catholic orders were not allowed to serve in England, she went to the convent of Saint Monica that had been established for English Catholic exiles in Louvain. A kinswoman, Jane Haydock, was already serving there and an ancestor, Father Gilbert Haydock (1682–1749) had served there as chaplain. There, on 2 February 1790, she professed as a canonesses regular of the Windesheim Congregation, taking the name Sr. Stanislaus, O.S.A. The nuns there followed the Rule of Saint Augustine and maintained a boarding school for girls.

Hostilities related to the Flanders Campaign precipitated by the French Revolution forced evacuation of the convent in 1794. Sister Stanislaus and her fellow nuns left on 28 June that year and settled in Hammersmith Convent near London, after a perilous escape over land and water via Breda, Rotterdam and Gravesend. In 1800, the nuns moved west to Amesbury, near the prehistoric monument of Stonehenge. After one year there, they settled in St Monica's Priory, Spetisbury in Blandford, Dorsetshire, where they began a boarding school for girls.

Known as Peggy by her family, Sr. Stanislaus frequently wrote to her brothers, although failing eyesight in her later years required her to have others write on her behalf. She died at Spetisbury on 11 April 1854, the last surviving member of St. Monica's convent at Louvain.

== See also ==
- Roman Catholicism in Great Britain
