= Tom Haydock (Scottish footballer) =

Scottish footballer

Personal information
- Full name: Thomas Haydock
- Date of birth: 24 July 1890
- Place of birth: Bridgeton, Scotland
- Date of death: 2 September 1918 (aged 28)
- Place of death: Bailleulval, France
- Position: Centre half

Senior career*
Years	Team	Apps	(Gls)
1912–1916	Queen's Park	26	(0)
- * Club domestic league appearances and goals

Thomas Haydock (24 July 1890 – 2 September 1918) was a Scottish amateur footballer who played as a centre half in the Scottish League for Queen's Park.

== Personal life ==
Haydock was a graduate of Glasgow University and was a travelling salesman for the Clydevale Oil & Colour Company, Bridgeton. In September 1914, one month after the outbreak of the First World War, Haydock enlisted in the Queen's Own Cameron Highlanders. In January 1915, he was commissioned as a second lieutenant in the Cameronians (Scottish Rifles). Haydock saw action at Gallipoli and Palestine, before being seriously wounded during an attack on Umbrella Hill during the Third Battle of Gaza on 1 November 1917. He did not return to his battalion until August 1918, after it had been deployed on the Western Front. Haydock was wounded during an attack on the Hindenburg Line, west of Quéant on 2 September 1918 and died the same day at a Casualty Clearing Station in Bailleulval. He was buried in Bac-du-Sud British Cemetery, Bailleulval.

== Career statistics ==
Appearances and goals by club, season and competition
Club	Season	League			Scottish Cup		Other		Total	
Club	Season	Division	Apps	Goals	Apps	Goals	Apps	Goals	Apps	Goals
Queen's Park	1913–14	Scottish First Division	1	0	0	0	1 (Note: Appearance in Glasgow Merchants Charity Cup)	0	2	0
Queen's Park	1914–15	Scottish First Division	16	0	—		1	0	17	0
Queen's Park	1915–16	Scottish First Division	9	0	—		1 (Note: Appearance in Glasgow Cup)	0	10	0
Career total			26	0	0	0	3	0	29	0
