= James Haydock =

James Haydock (1764?–1809) was a Catholic recusant priest who served during the waning years of the Penal Period in England and died a martyr to charity while attending the sick of his congregation during an epidemic.

== Early years ==
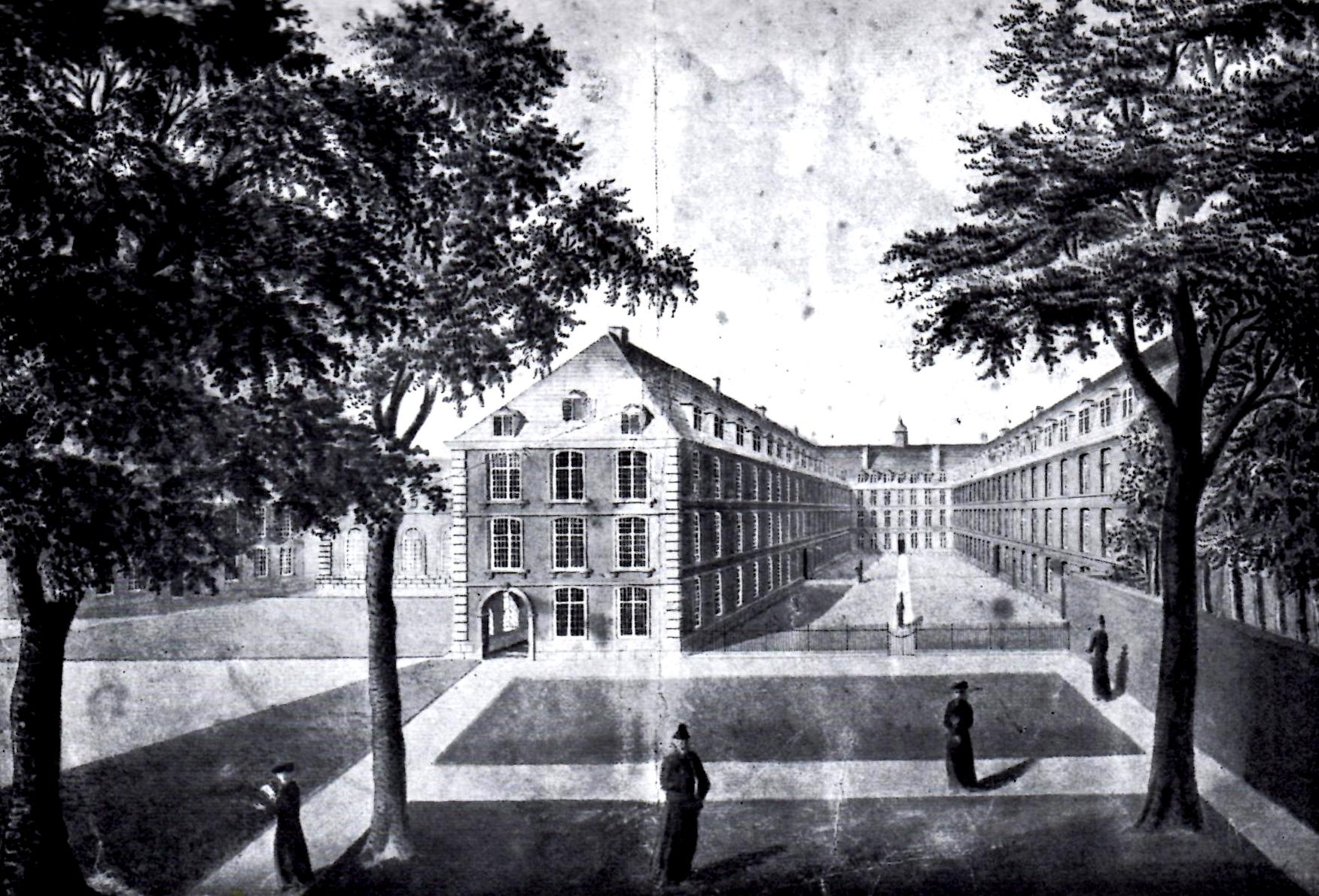
DOUAY COLLEGE: water color by George Leo Haydock while he was a student. The building was demolished ca. 1920

James Haydock's Certificate of Ordination as a Deacon, the final step before ordination as a priest.

James Haydock was the eldest of three brothers from the second marriage of his father George, to Ann (née Cottam), which would produce one of the greatest generations of the ancient Catholic recusant Haydock family. His siblings included George Leo Haydock, Thomas Haydock and Margaret Haydock. James was born in Cottam, Preston, Lancashire, in an area called The Fylde, where Catholics had retained a relatively strong presence since initiation of the Penal Laws in the 16th century. Different sources give alternatively 1764, 1765, or 1766 as his year of birth. His elementary education was at a school established at Mowbreck Hall in Wesham. In 1780, at the age of "about 14," he went to complete his education and eventually study for the priesthood at the English College, Douai (contemporary English spelling, Douay), France. He arrived there on 18 June, after passing through London, there witnessing the aftermath of the anti-Catholic Gordon Riots that had occurred a few days before. In 1785 he was joined by his two brothers, George Leo and Thomas. It may be a reflection of the instability of the Church's status during this revolutionary period that he was ordained to the diaconate in Bruges in 1791, and to the priesthood in Arras in 1792. He continued at Douay for a few months serving as professor. However, the situation in France became more threatening on 1 February 1793, when France declared war on England, so he departed Douay ten days later Missus in Vineam (sent to the vineyard), i.e., to serve in the English missions. He would be one of the last priests to complete his priestly studies at Douay before the French Revolutionary government finally closed the college in October, 1793. Shortly before then, James' brothers George Leo and Thomas were forced in the middle of their studies to flee back to England.

== The Missions in England ==
Although the Penal Laws were moderating by this time, there were still no formal Catholic parishes in England. The remaining faithful were served by "missions" where services might be held in a variety of facilities depending on the local situation. The newly ordained Father Haydock's first assignment was as domestic chaplain to John Trafford of Trafford House near Manchester. Trafford was one of several members of the local landed gentry who remained loyal to the Catholic faith and maintained chapels in their houses. Trafford's chapel was discreetly located "easy of access for the people who entered up a stairway in the yard at the rear of the building." While James Haydock was at Trafford House, his brother George Leo was ordained priest in 1798 and went on to serve missions at Ugthorpe, Whitby and Penrith. His brother Thomas opened a printing business and would go on to publish the famous Haydock Bible. James remained at Trafford House until 1808. Experiencing apparent harassment by a local militia group called the Trafford Volunteers, he requested a transfer and was assigned to an independent chapel in the nearby town of Lea, Lancashire. It was there that he contracted typhus while serving the sick of his congregation. On 13 April 1809 he wrote his brother George complaining of a "bad cold." He died twelve days later on 25 April 1809.

== The Haydock Family Plot ==
Father Haydock was interred in his family's plot at St. Mary's Church (now known as St. Mary's Newhouse) in Newsham, Lancashire. After the death of his mother and one of his sisters, a family gravestone was laid. Barely legible today, it reads: "In memory of the Rev. JAMES HAYDOCK of Lea, son of George and ANN HAYDOCK, of the Tagg, who departed this life, the 25th of Apr., 1809, aged 45. Also of the above ANN HAYDOCK, who departed this life 17th Apr. 1822, aged 92 years, Also of ELIZABETH HAYDOCK, daughter of the above ANN, who departed this life on the 12th day of Sept., 1827, aged 67 years."

== See also ==
- Roman Catholicism in Great Britain (The Eighteenth Century & The Catholic Revival in the Nineteenth Century)
