= Thomas Haydock =

English publisher and schoolteacher

Thomas Haydock (1772–1859) was an English Catholic schoolmaster and publisher born to one of the oldest Recusant families. His dedication to making religious books available to fellow Catholics suffering under the English Penal Laws came at great personal cost.

He is best remembered for publishing an edition of the Douay Bible with extended commentary, compiled chiefly by his brother George Leo Haydock. Originally published in 1811 and still in print, it is one of the most enduring contributions to Catholic biblical studies.

== Family background ==
Haydock was born on 21 February 1772 in Cottam, Preston, Lancashire in northern England. The Haydock family's prominence in British history antedates Henry VIII's split with Rome as established by the service in Parliament of Christopher Haydock (1499?-1566?). Although most prominent British families embraced the new Protestant religion, many Haydock descendants would rank among the most vocal and influential of those who remained faithful to Catholicism. The Lancashire area especially was slow to relinquish its Faith. Speaking of Lancashire, Lord Burghley, advisor to Queen Elizabeth I complained, The Papists every where are growen so confident, that they contempne Magistrats and their authoritie. In later centuries Lancashire would retain a small but determined Catholic population supported by families of the landed gentry, sometimes hosting secret Masses in their homes. The Haydocks were among the most prominent of these families and became legendary in their service to the Catholic Recusant movement. During the Elizabethan persecution, Father George Haydock (1556–1584), a "seminary priest", suffered martyrdom. He was beatified in 1987, earning the title “Blessed.” Early in the 18th century, Father Cuthbert Haydock (1684–1763) said secret Masses in a chapel hidden in the attic of Lane End House, Mawdesley, the home of his sister and brother-in-law.

Thomas Haydock was part of a unique generation whose combined contributions to this family tradition would be extraordinary. His father was a namesake of Blessed George Haydock. His two brothers both became priests. Older brother James Haydock (1765–1809) died caring for the sick of his congregation during a typhus epidemic. Younger brother George Leo (1774–1849), in addition to his work on the Bible, spent his career pastoring poor rural missions. A sister, Margaret Haydock (1767? - 1854), joined the Augustinian nuns, taking the name Sister Stanislaus.

== Attempts to become a priest ==
After receiving his elementary education at a school established for Catholic students at Mowbreck Hall, Thomas was sent in 1785 to the English College, Douai, France, where he joined his brother, George. This institution was established for Catholic exiles in the 16th century to provide secondary education and preparation for the priesthood. His studies were interrupted in 1793, when the French revolutionary government declared war with England, closed the English College, and imprisoned some of its pro-England students. Both Haydock brothers managed to elude the authorities and escape back to England.

Continuing his pursuit of ordination, Thomas next went to the English College, Lisbon. His superiors there did not feel he had a priestly vocation and sent him home in 1795. Undeterred, he went to the new seminary established at Crook Hall, Durham with his brother George in 1796. Again, his vocation was questioned. Described as “easy going” (see also the “Tragic Personal Life” section below), he seems to have been judged by his superiors as constitutionally unsuited for the risks and hardships of the Catholic priesthood in Penal Period England. The eloquence and dedication Thomas expresses in his letters certainly support his sincerity; and his three attempts at the priesthood show his tenacity. However, against the wishes of his older and recently ordained brother James, he was finally persuaded to leave the seminary. Family friend and former Douay professor Benedict Rayment (1764–1842), who would later serve as editor of some of Haydock's published works, remarked that of the three Haydock brothers seeking the priesthood, ‘’Thomas would have been the best’’.

== Catholic Publisher ==
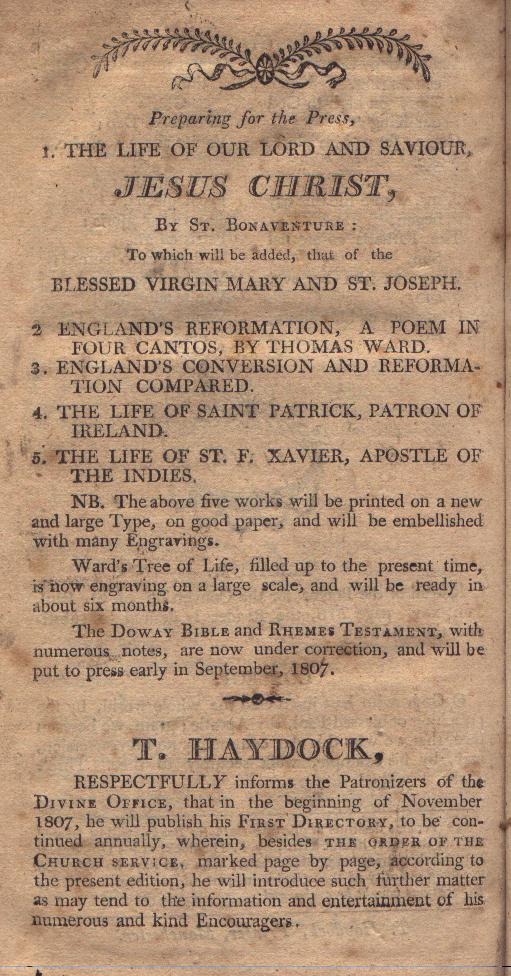
An 1806 Advertisement for Thomas Haydock, Publisher

Haydock moved to Manchester to begin his secular career. He opened a language school that proved successful. However, his love of literature drew him to publishing. Despite the Penal Laws it was possible by Haydock’s time for Catholic publishers to work openly in England. In addition, the market for Catholic works was improving in the Manchester area. Expanded local commercial dealings required a more literate population, which included many Catholics. A local pastor, Rev. Rowland Broomhead (1787–1820) was placing a strong emphasis on religious instruction, requiring a supply of Haydock’s books and pamphlets. Encouraged by his elder brother James, he began his publishing career in 1799 with a new edition of The Garden of the Soul, a popular prayer book by Richard Challoner (1691–1781), and Letter on Papal Supremacy to the Rev. Geo. Bruning (author not stated). A recent study documents 74 books showing Haydock's name as printer, publisher, or bookseller on the title page by 1831. Contemporary advertisements indicate other works whose actual publication cannot be verified. Since many of Haydock’s books were small and cheaply bound, some may not have survived and now be lost to history.

Haydock’s works were mostly devotional, e.g., The Imitation of Christ (1800), A Collection of Hymns and Spiritual Songs (1807), and Pious Reflections for Every Day in the Month (1811). Haydock sometimes collaborated with former Douay associates. In one case Father Thomas Penswick (1772–1836), a former classmate, translated The Love of Jesus in the Adorable Sacrament of the Altar (1801) from the French of Henry-Mary Boudon. (Ironically, Penswick, who later became Vicar Apostolic of the Northern District, would have a disagreement with Thomas’ brother George, resulting in the latter's temporary suspension from his priestly functions.) Haydock also published controversial works such as The Biblicals Routed! or, the Able and Spirited Defence of the Roman Catholic Religion, by Patrick Spence (1827), and a work of poetry, The Nymphs of Drumkerin; or, Love and Scalteen!! A Humorous Poem by H. I. Comus, (1827).

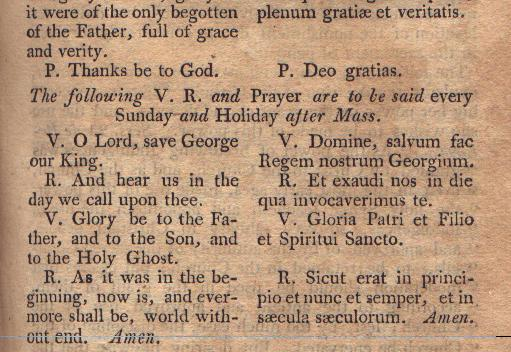
Page from Thomas Haydock's Divine Office, 1806

One of Haydock's more notable works appeared in 1806. Entitled The Divine Office for the Use of the Laity, it appeared in two small volumes and was edited by Father Benedict Rayment q.v.. This work includes the Ordinary of the Mass and the daily Propers in parallel Latin and English columns. Maintaining national loyalty in the face of persecution, the Ordinary of the Mass in Haydock's edition dutifully calls for the officiating priest to say after the Last Gospel, Lord, save George our King. This is a reference to George III, ironically an opponent of ongoing efforts to liberalize the Penal Laws.

== The Haydock Bible ==
The 1806 Divine Office cited above carries the following announcement of what would become Haydock's most important work: The Doway Bible and Rhemes Testament, with numerous notes, are now under correction, and will be put to press early in September, 1807.

The Doway or Douay Bible (Douay-Rheims Bible) was the standard translation for English speaking Catholics. It was originally translated from the Latin Vulgate in the 16th century chiefly by Gregory Martin, one of the first professors at the English Catholic College affiliated to the university of Douai. It was revised and newly annotated in the 18th century by Richard Challoner q.v., a scholar from university of Douai. Shortly after Challoner's death, Father Bernard MacMahon (1736?-1816) published further revisions of the Douay-Rheims Bible. A large new edition of the Bible complete with an extended commentary seems a daunting project for a publisher of Haydock's limited means. He may have been encouraged by the success of a similar Protestant effort: the self-interpreting Bible of John Brown (Theologian, 1722–1787), first published in 1778 and frequently reprinted. The contemporary controversy swirling around efforts to repeal the Penal Laws and the place of Biblical exegetics in that controversy were certainly major encouraging factors for the proposed new Bible. In any case, Haydock's great enthusiasm for the Catholic cause was sufficient to overcome all obstacles.

Haydock's old friend Father Benedict Rayment at first offered to compile the commentary for the new Bible, but soon withdrew. Haydock then enlisted his brother George, by now ordained and a pastor of the mission at Ugthorpe, for the project. Father Haydock used the standard Challoner-MacMahon text. His extended commentary was partly original and partly compiled from writings during the Patristic and later eras. Catholics believed the Bible, properly interpreted by the Church, could be used to combat Protestant attempts to dismantle the authority of Rome. As Father Haydock states in his Preface: To obviate the misinterpretations of the many heretical works which disgrace the Scripture, and deluge this unhappy country, has been one main design of the present undertaking.

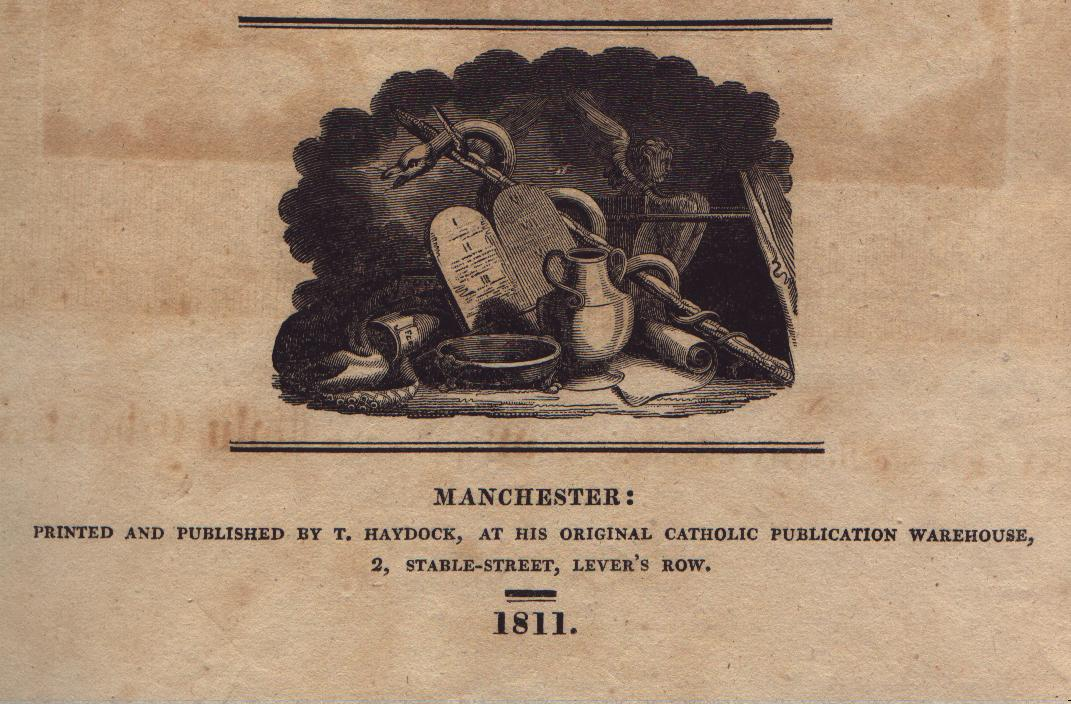
Publisher's Imprint: First edition of the Haydock Bible,1811

Production of the Bible would be delayed well beyond the original 1807 projected date. Thomas went to Dublin to settle some business affairs and to open a new establishment. He did not return to Manchester until 1810. In a peculiar turn of events, a competing Catholic Manchester publisher, Oswald Syers, had begun publishing his own Douay Bible in March 1811. Embarrassed by his delay, Haydock had to move quickly to begin his own edition four months later. Syers finished his edition first, by 1813. However, Haydock's more impressive edition, completed in 1814, quickly overtook it in popularity.

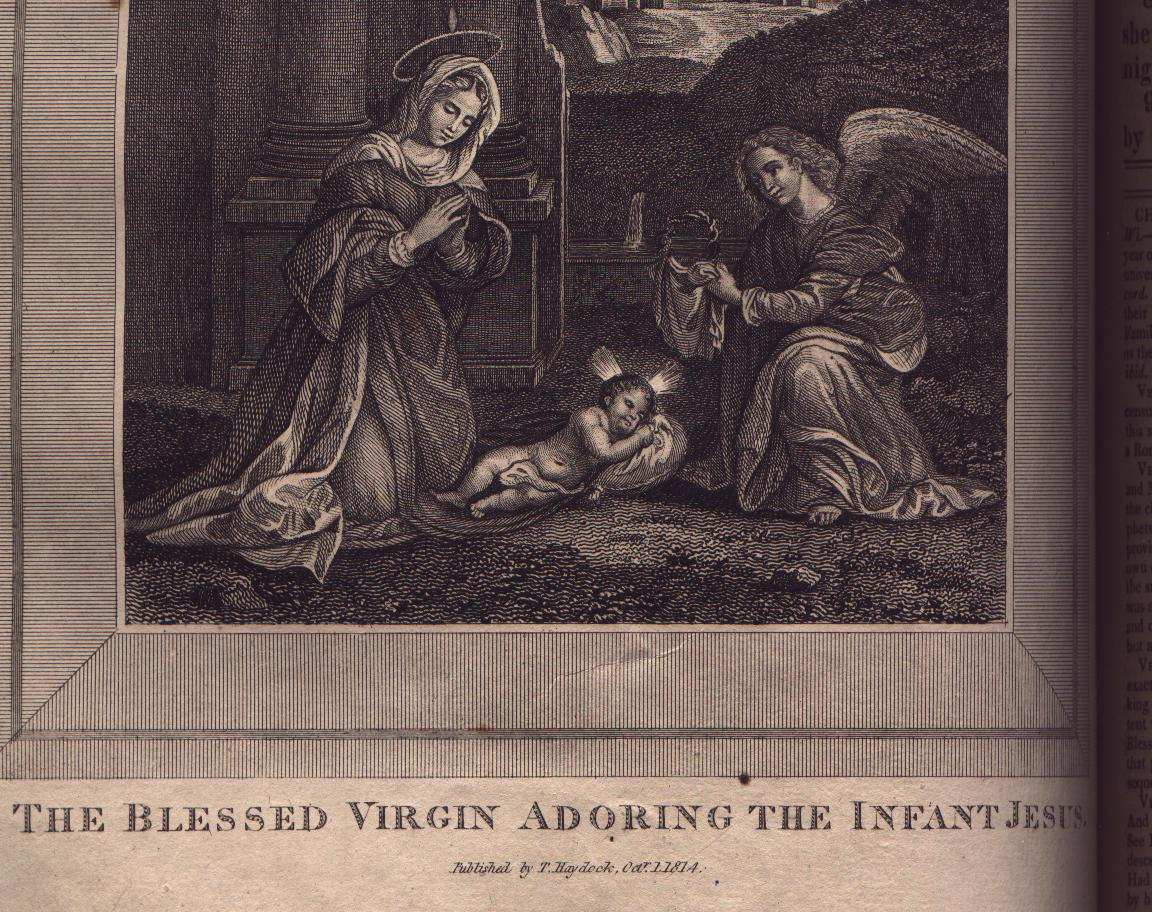
Engraving Detail: First Edition of the Haydock Bible

As were many editions of the Bible at the time, Haydock's was published and sold by subscription, a few leaves at a time, in fortnightly “numbers.” Subscribers would accumulate the numbers and ultimately have the completed Bible bound. As the Bible progressed, new general title pages were issued in 1811, 1812,1813, and 1823, showing variously Thomas Haydock's Manchester or Dublin locations. Most copies of the complete Bible would include leaves published from both locations. For his brother George, annotating the entire Bible under a demanding production schedule while continuing his pastoral duties at Ugthorpe proved too great a task. Therefore, ca. March, 1812, Father Rayment was again called on, and this time persuaded, to assist. He compiled the New Testament portion of the commentary with the assistance of colleagues. Pressure to meet deadlines was the likely cause of some errors. However, given Haydock's limited resources, his Bible must be considered a remarkable achievement. It was produced in impressive large folio with full page plates, and dedicated To that enlightened body of men, the Catholics of the United Kingdoms of England, Ireland and Scotland, in admiration of the steady zeal with which they have kept the deposit of faith bequeathed them by their forefathers, and handed down, without interruption or adulteration to their grateful posterity. The Bible received an enthusiastic welcome from English and Irish Catholics. At least 1,500 copies of the first edition were sold. Haydock's folio Bible would continue in circulation until at least 1823, with a separate New Testament appearing in 1831.

== Personal life ==
Thomas Haydock had an enthusiasm for publishing, but was seriously lacking in business skills. He had a trustful nature that associates freely exploited, depriving him of profit and forcing him continually to operate on a shoestring. Although his Bible sold well, he lost money to his managers, clerks, and canvassers and was forced heavily into debt to an unscrupulous lender. Former Douay classmate Father (later Bishop) Robert Gradwell (1777–1860) wrote in August 1817 that Haydock was living in Dublin, “low in the world.” In 1818 he was arrested for debt and served four months in prison.

The experience did not discourage him from continuing his publishing business. By 1822 he was able to issue the first volume of a new edition of the Bible, a more modest undertaking this time, in a smaller octavo format and without the extended commentary of the folio edition. He had to take on several partners to complete the Bible's second volume in 1824. This edition had many misprints, including the notable substitution of fornications for fortifications in II Corinthians 10:4. He had no known involvement with an American folio edition of the Haydock Bible published in Philadelphia in 1825.

Circa 1818 Haydock married Mary Lynch or Lynde of Dublin. Unfortunately, tragedy would dog his family life, just as it did his business. Mary died in 1823. Their three children all died young. The name of only one is known: George (1822–1840). Curiously, some books dated 1827 have the imprint, Thomas Haydock & Son. The apparent inconsistency between the publication date and the likely ages of any sons that could have been living at the time is a mystery.

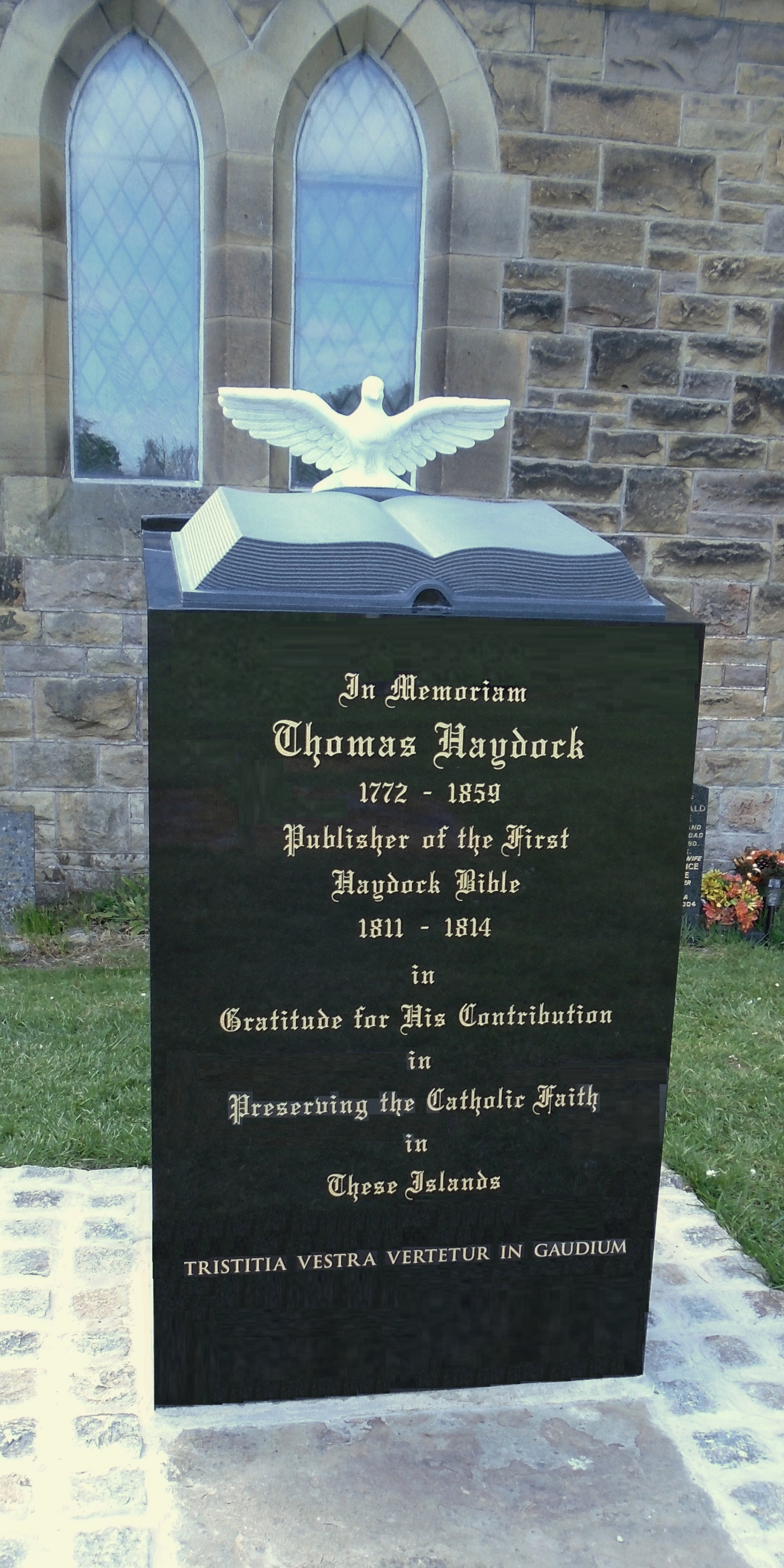
Memorial Monument to Thomas Haydock dedicated May 15, 2016 at St. Mary's Newhouse Church, Newsham, Lancashire.

Haydock struggled on with publishing at least until 1831, when he was able to reissue the New Testament portion of his original folio Bible. No dated works after that year are known, although he published undated works that may have appeared later. In 1832 he made an unsuccessful attempt to begin a journal called The Catholic Penny Magazine. At some point, he opened a school in Dublin where he resumed teaching until 1840. He left Dublin probably about that year and moved first to Liverpool, then to Preston. He could only watch as other publishers enjoyed success with new editions of his Bible: two British editions, one in 1845–48, another ca. 1853, and an American edition in 1852-4. He died at Preston in 1859, aged 87, with an estate valued at “less than 100 Pounds Sterling.” He was buried in the Haydock family plot at St. Mary's Church, Newsham.

== Haydock’s Enduring Legacy ==
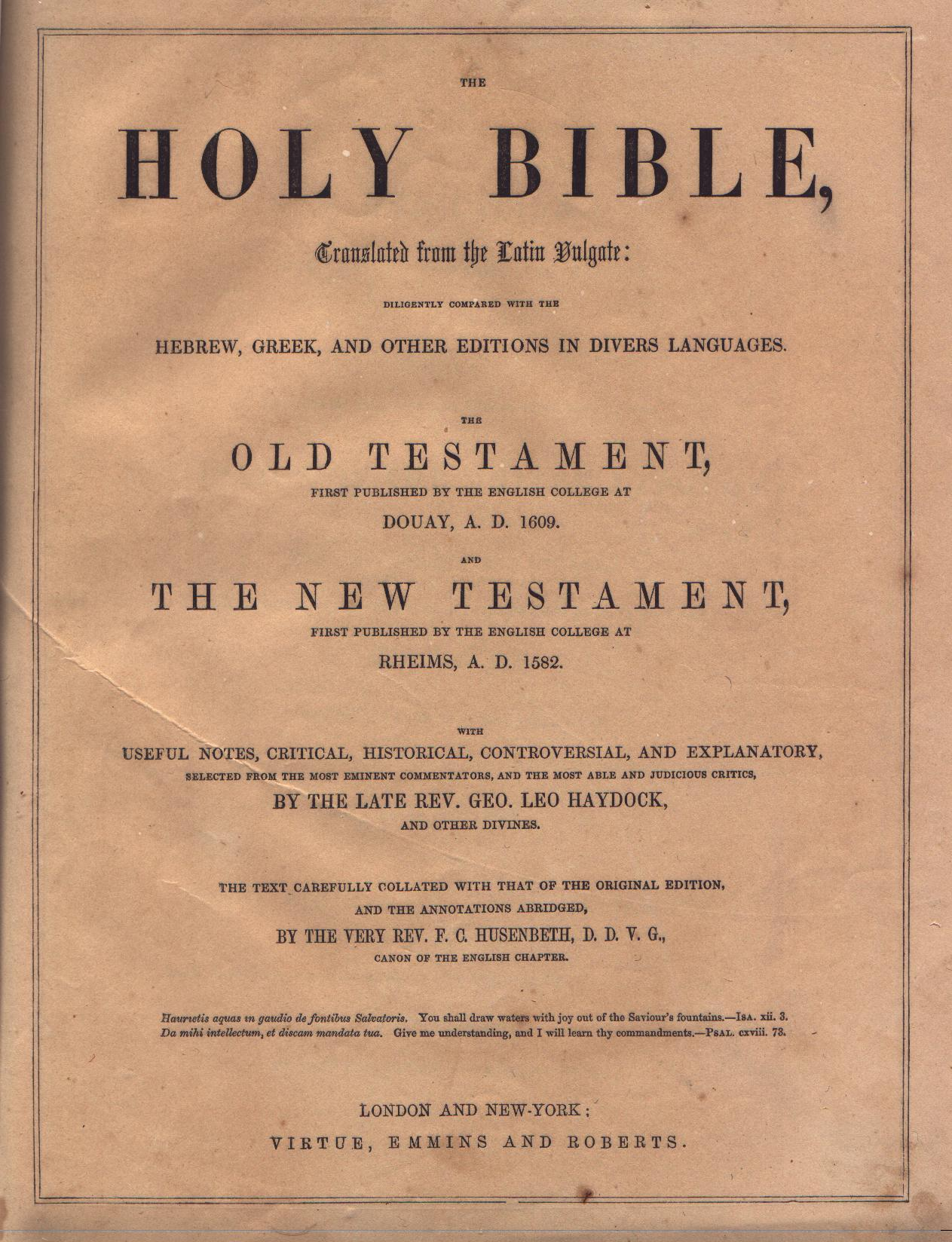
ca. 1853: Example of the Haydock Bible Edition Used in the Kennedy Inaugural

Even with his unflagging optimism, Haydock probably could never have imagined the long-term success the Bible he had first published would achieve. After his death, new editions continued to appear on both sides of the Atlantic, keeping it in print until at least 1910. In 1961, the 150th anniversary of Haydock's first edition, the first Catholic President of the United States, John F. Kennedy (1917–1963) would take his inaugural oath of office on a copy of a Haydock Bible owned by his mother's family, the Fitzgeralds. Late in the 20th century, a new series of editions began to appear, prompted by the interest of traditionalist Catholics. They became concerned that modern Catholic exegesis is diluting the Faith that the Haydock family and the Catholic Recusant movement fought so hard to preserve and to hand down without interruption or adulteration to their grateful posterity. The Haydock Bible has reached its bicentennial anniversary in 2011 not only still in print, but also quite at home in the digital age, appearing on CDs and on-line (see link below). For a detailed history of the many editions of the Haydock Bible and the changes that were made to it over the years, see the related article, George Leo Haydock. A memorial monument to Thomas Haydock was erected near his grave at St. Mary's Newhouse Chapel on May 15, 2016.

== See also ==
- Douay-Rheims Bible
- Roman Catholicism in Great Britain (The 18th century & The Catholic Revival in the 19th century)
