= Cuthbert Haydock =

Catholic recusant priest (1684–1763)

Cuthbert Haydock (1684-1763), one of a long line of priests from the prominent Catholic recusant Haydock family, helped to keep his faith alive during the long penal period in England by serving mass in secret for those who remained faithful to the Catholic Church.

== Early years ==
Cuthbert Haydock was one of eight children. His eldest brother, William, inherited the Haydock family manor, Cottam Hall Lancashire. Cuthbert and another brother, Gilbert, became priests. A third brother, Hugh, began studying for the priesthood, but withdrew before completion of his studies. The more violent persecution of Catholics, including the execution of priests, has ceased by Cuthbert's time. However, priests could still not be trained in England, so Cuthbert went across the Channel to France to attend the English College, Douai (contemporary English spelling, Douay) where he was ordained in 1714, and then sent back to England.

== The Missions in England ==
Although the Penal Laws were moderating by this time, there were still no formal Catholic parishes in England. The remaining faithful were served by "missions" where services might be held in a variety of facilities depending on the local situation. The newly ordained Father Haydock's first assignment was a mission established at the home of his sister Mary: Lane Ends House at Mawdesley Chorley Lancashire, where there were hiding places for priests and a secret chapel in the attic.

== Legend Surrounding Lane Ends House ==
The chapel in the attic of Lane Ends House as it appeared in 1906. The skull is in the glass case.

Lane Ends House was also known as Skull House. This is due to its possession of a skull, said to be that of one of the Haydock ancestors, either William Haydock (1483?-1537), a Cistercian monk who was executed in 1536 for his part in the Pilgrimage of Grace, or Blessed George Haydock (1556-1584), executed for being a priest in violation of Queen Elizabeth's Penal law. This skull had been kept at the Haydock family manor, Cottam Hall. However, Cuthbert's brother William sold the estate, and sometime afterward, the skull was transferred to Lane Ends House, where it was venerated as a relic.

== Later Assignments ==
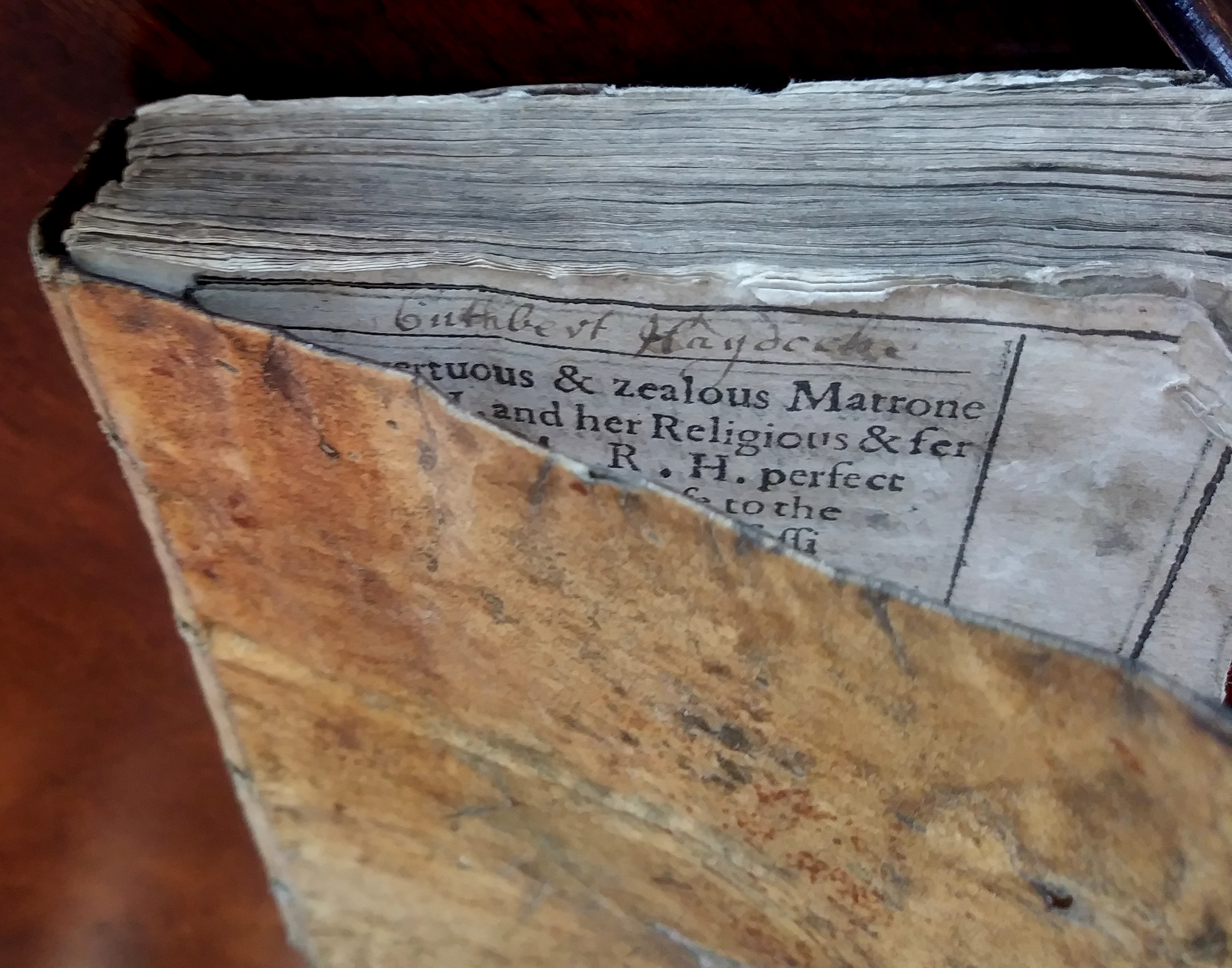
16th century Catholic Recusant book secretly printed in England and owned by Father Cuthbert Haydock

Father Haydock went on to serve missions in nearby Euxton Lancashire, the home of a cousin, William Anderton; at Hodsock Park Nottinghamshire, the home of another of his sisters; then at Worksop Manor Nottinghamshire, where he became chaplain to the 9th Duke of Norfolk. While there, his zeal caught the attention of a local Protestant minister, Rev. John Cook, who denounced him as a "zealot," who "spread his poison openly whether in taverns, or at market crosses or on crowded thoroughfares." His other activities included assisting his brother Gilbert in handling business arrangements for the exiled nuns at St. Monica's Convent in Louvain and in recruiting students for his alma mater at Douay. He died at age 78, leaving an extensive collection of books and manuscripts, some of which are now at Stonyhurst College.

== See also ==
- Roman Catholicism in Great Britain (The Eighteenth Century & The Catholic Revival in the Nineteenth Century)
