= Ugthorpe Old Hall =

House in Ugthorpe, North Yorkshire, England

- Location within North Yorkshire

General information
- Location: Ugthorpe, North Yorkshire, England
- Coordinates: 54.4884°N 0.7750°W
- Year built: 1586
- Renovated: 18th century (extended)
- Client: Radcliffe family

Listed Building – Grade II*
- Official name: The Old Hall
- Designated: 19 February 1952
- Reference no.: 1173451

Ugthorpe Old Hall (officially listed as The Old Hall) is a historic building in Ugthorpe, a village in North Yorkshire, England.

The building was constructed in 1586 for the Radcliffe family, formerly of Mulgrave Castle. The family were Catholics, and there is a possible priest hole in a chimney in an outbuilding, which may have been used by Nicholas Postgate. An extension was built in the 18th century, to house a new kitchen. The building was Grade II* listed in 1952.

The house is built of sandstone, and has a pantile roof with stone ridges, copings and kneelers. It has two storeys and three bays, the right bay projecting slightly, while the later extension on the left is single storey. On the front is a doorway with a hood on brackets. The windows on the main part are mullioned or mullioned and transomed, and on the extension is a casement window with a keystone. Inside, there are wall paintings. Inside the house are 18th-century wall paintings and there is early woodwork, including mouldings to beams and joists.

== See also ==
- Grade II* listed buildings in North Yorkshire (district)
- Listed buildings in Ugthorpe
