= St Ninian's Church =

St Ninian's Church may refer to any of a number of churches dedicated to Saint Ninian:

in England

- St Ninian's Church, Brougham, Cumbria
- St Ninian's Church, Wooler, Northumberland
- St Ninian's Church, Whitby, North Yorkshire

in Scotland

- St Ninian's Church, Leith, Edinburgh
- St Ninian's Church, Tynet

in Isle of Man

- St. Ninian's Church, Douglas, Isle of Man, one of Isle of Man's Registered Buildings
