= St Anne's Church, Ugthorpe =

Church in Ugthorpe, North Yorkshire, England

Coordinates: 54.489°N 0.769°W

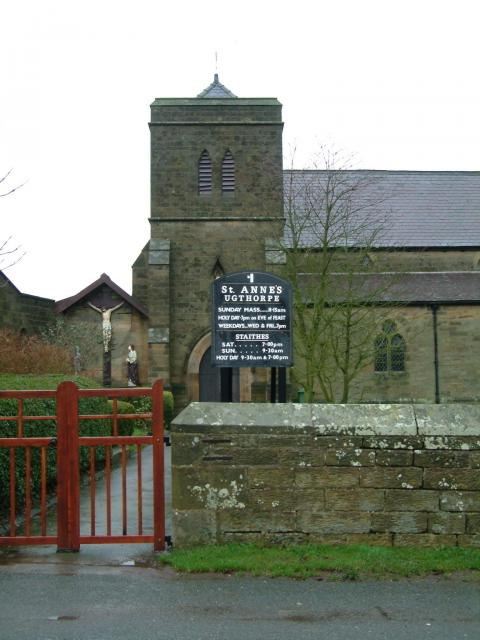
The church, in 2008

St Anne's Church is a Catholic church in Ugthorpe, a village in North Yorkshire, in England.

A Catholic chapel was established in Ugthorpe in 1679, in the attic of the priest's house. A dedicated church was built in 1810, then in 1855 it was converted into a school and the current church was opened. The neo-Gothic church was designed by George Goldie, with funding from the Nelson family. The building was grade II listed in 2014.

The church is built of sandstone with Welsh slate roofs. It consists of a nave with a clerestory, north and south aisles, a north sacristy, a chancel, and a west tower containing a porch. The tower has two stages, a string course, a parapet and a pyramidal roof. The porch has a doorway with a pointed arch, above which is a niche containing a statue. To the left of the tower is a Calvary. Inside the church are the original pews, an older altar rail, and a painted stone altar. The east and west windows have stained glass by John Hardman Powell and two windows in the north aisle may also be by him.

== See also ==
- Listed buildings in Ugthorpe
