= Listed buildings in Ugthorpe =

Ugthorpe is a civil parish in the county of North Yorkshire, England. It contains 16 listed buildings that are recorded in the National Heritage List for England. Of these, one is listed at Grade II*, the middle of the three grades, and the others are at Grade II, the lowest grade. The parish contains the village of Ugthorpe and the surrounding countryside. Most of the listed buildings are houses and associated structures, and farmhouses and farm buildings, and the others include a church and a milepost.

== Key ==
Grade	Criteria
II*	Particularly important buildings of more than special interest
II	Buildings of national importance and special interest

== Buildings ==
Name and location	Photograph	Date	Notes	Grade
The Old Hall; 54.48837°N 0.77507°W	—	1586	The house is in sandstone, and has a pantile roof with stone ridges, copings and kneelers. There are two storeys and three bays, the right bay projecting slightly, and a later single-storey extension on the left. On the front is a doorway with a hood on brackets. The windows on the main part are mullioned or mullioned and transomed, and on the extension is a casement window with a keystone. Inside, there are wall paintings.	II*
Wood Hill House and barn 54.47671°N 0.80283°W	—	17th century	The farmhouse and barn are in sandstone, with stepped eaves, and a tile roof with stone copings, and curved kneelers. There are two storeys, the main house has three bays, to the right is a downhouse , lower with two bays, and at the left is a single-bay barn. The downhouse has a blocked door with a flattened Tudor arch and a window inserted. The main part has a blocked chamfered and quoined window, and a small sash window above. The barn has external stone steps and a stable door with a chamfered surround.	II
Barn northeast of The Old Hall; 54.48844°N 0.77471°W	—	Late 17th century (probable)	The barn is in sandstone, and has a pantile roof with stone ridges, copings and kneelers. There are one storey and a loft, and four bays. It contains three stable doors, one with a flattened Tudor arch, a small opening to the right, and two loft doors above.	II
Ugthorpe House; 54.49203°N 0.77885°W	—	Late 17th century	The house, which was later extended, is in sandstone, and has pantile roofs with tile ridges, stone-ridge copings, and ball-on-pedestal finials. The older part has two storeys, three bays and projecting gabled single-bay wings. In the centre is a doorway with a fanlight, a shaped lintel and a hood mould, and the windows are mullioned. On the right wing is a canted bay window with a parapet.	II
Low Broom House Farmhouse and outbuilding 54.49376°N 0.74747°W		Early 18th century	The farmhouse is in sandstone, and has a pantile roof with a tile ridge, and stone copings and block kneelers. The main part has two storeys and three bays, to the left is an extension with one storey and an attic, and one wide bay, and further to the left is a recessed single-storey single-bay outhouse. The house has sash windows, on the extension is a doorway and casement windows, and the outhouse has a stable door and a window.	II
Biggin House Farmhouse and outbuilding 54.47648°N 0.76358°W	—	Early to mid-18th century	The house and stable are in sandstone and have a pantile roof with stone ridges, copings and kneelers. The house has two storeys and two wide bays, and a recessed addition of one storey and an attic on the right. It contains casement windows and raking dormers. The stable has one storey and a loft, and two bays, and beyond it are a further three bays.	II
Broom House Farmhouse; 54.49326°N 0.75403°W	—	Early to mid-18th century	The farmhouse is in sandstone, with chamfered quoins, a floor band, and a pantile roof with stone ridges, copings and kneelers. There are two storeys and three bays, and a wide single-bay extension on the right. The main doorway has a quoined surround and a fanlight, it is flanked by casement windows, and all have keystones. The upper floor contains sash windows, the windows in the extension are casements, and at the rear is a stair window.	II
Gate piers and wall, Mulgrave Farmhouse; 54.48270°N 0.75065°W	—	18th century	The gate piers to the south of the house are in sandstone and have a square plan. They are rusticated, and each pier has a cornice band and a low pyramidal-topped blocking slab. The wall is later, dating probably from the early 19th century, and extends to the east.	II
Pump Farmhouse; 54.49006°N 0.77310°W	—	Mid-18th century (probable)	The farmhouse is in sandstone, with quoins, and a pantile roof with stone ridges, copings and kneelers. There are two storeys and three bays. In the centre is a doorway, above it is a small window, and the other windows are casements with alternate-block jambs. The ground floor openings have wedge lintels with tall keystones.	II
Barn and outbuilding west of Pump Farmhouse; 54.49013°N 0.77340°W	—	Mid to late 18th century	The barn and outbuilding to the left are in sandstone, with quoins, and a pantile roof with stone ridges, copings and kneelers. The barn has two storeys and five bays, and contains stable doors and small windows. External steps lead to a loading door, and there are small loft openings at the ends. The outbuilding has one storey and it contains stable doors and small windows.	II
Cart shed east of Pump Farmhouse; 54.49002°N 0.77298°W	—	Mid to late 18th century	The cart shed is in sandstone, with quoins, and a pantile roof with stone ridges, copings and kneelers. There is one storey, and three bays, and contains two double cart doors under oak lintels.	II
Mulgrave Farmhouse and outbuildings 54.48290°N 0.75051°W	—	Late 18th century (probable)	The farmhouse is in sandstone, and has a stone slate roof, repaired in Welsh slate, with stone ridges, copings and moulded kneelers. There are two storeys, three bays and a rear extension. In the centre is a wooden porch with side lights and a bargeboarded gable. Above it is a narrow quasi-Venetian window, and the other windows are sashes. A single-storey link joins the house to the stable range, which contains windows with keystones.	II
Hall Cottage; 54.48857°N 0.77546°W	—	Early 19th century	The house, which may have an earlier core, is in stone, with quoins, and a pantile roof with stone coping and curved kneelers. There are two storeys and three bays. The doorway has a chamfered quoined surround, and the windows are casements.	II
St Anne's Church; 54.48964°N 0.76924°W		1855	The church, designed by George Goldie, is in sandstone with Welsh slate] roofs. It consists of a nave with a clerestory, north and south aisles, a north sacristy, a chancel, and a west tower containing a porch. The tower has two stages, a string course, a parapet and a pyramidal roof. The porch has a doorway with a pointed arch, above which is a niche containing a statue. To the left of the tower is a Calvary.	II
Milepost; 54.49255°N 0.79628°W	—	Late 19th century	The milepost on the east side of the A171 road is in cast iron. It has a triangular plan and a sloping top. On the top is inscribed "NY" and "RCC". On both faces are pointing hands, on the left face is "WHITBY", and on the right face is "GUISBOROUGH".	II
Farm buildings to east of Mulgrave Farmhouse; 54.48308°N 0.74978°W		Undated	The farm buildings include a former coach house, a barn with a gin gang, stables, pig sties, a byre and a dovecote, and they form a square around a courtyard. They are in sandstone and brick, and have pantile roofs with stone ridges and kneelers. The coach house has quoins, and a large round-arched carriage entrance with an initialled keystone. The dovecote has three pigeon holes, an alighting shelf and a pyramidal roof.	II
