= Our Lady and St Edmund's Church, Abingdon =

Our Lady and St Edmund's Church
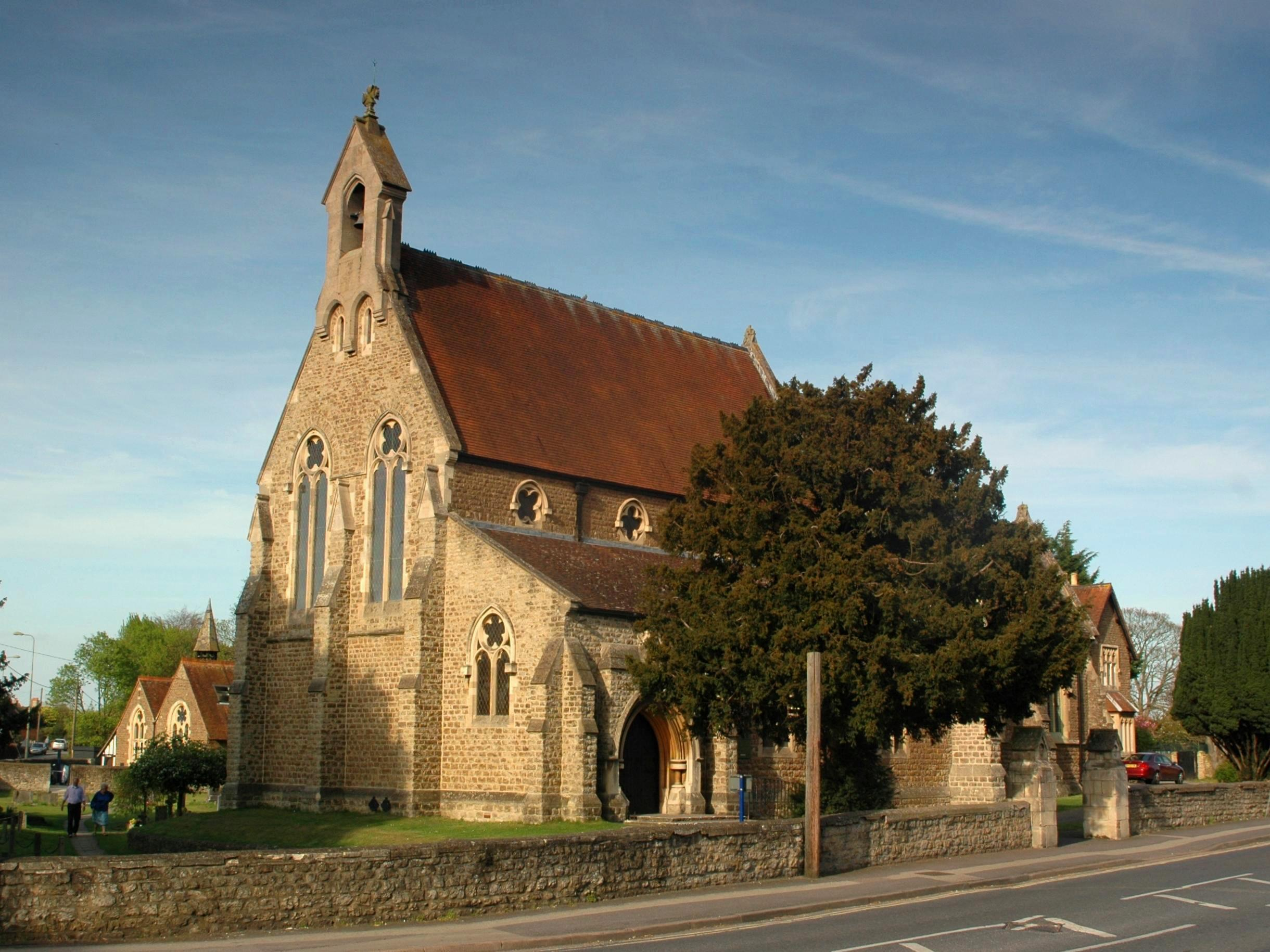
- Our Lady and St Edmund's Church
- 51.6746°N 1.27787°W
- OS grid reference: SU 50029 97560
- Location: Abingdon-on-Thames
- Country: England
- Denomination: Roman Catholic
- Website: OurLadyandStEdmund.org.uk

History
- Status: Parish church
- Founded: 1857
- Dedication: Saint Mary; Edmund of Abingdon

Architecture
- Functional status: Active
- Architect(s): William Wardell; George Goldie
- Style: Gothic Revival
- Groundbreaking: 1857
- Completed: 25 October 1865

Administration
- Province: Southwark
- Diocese: Portsmouth
- Deanery: St Edmund Campion
- Parish: Our Lady and St Edmund

Our Lady and St Edmund's Church is a Roman Catholic parish church in Abingdon-on-Thames, Oxfordshire, England. It was built in 1857, designed by William Wardell and George Goldie and paid for by Sir George Bowyer, 7th Baronet in the Gothic Revival style. It is located on the corner of Radley Road and Oxford Road near the town centre.

== History ==
=== Construction ===
In 1850, Sir George Bowyer, 7th Baronet converted to Catholicism. He became an advisor to Cardinal Nicholas Wiseman, Archbishop of Westminster and Pope Pius IX. Bowyer paid for Our Lady and St Edmund's Church. He commissioned William Wardell to design the church. In 1857, the church was completed and blessed by Thomas Grant, Bishop of Southwark. the church consisted of a chancel, south chapel, cloister and the presbytery. In 1858 the cemetery next to the church was consecrated again by Bishop Grant.

=== Developments ===
Wardell left for Australia and the church was later extended. On 25 October 1865, the church was opened. The enlarged church was designed by George Goldie. In 1873, a school, adjoining the church was opened. The school was staffed by the Sisters of Mercy from the local Convent of Mercy. In 1961, the school moved to the new building along the Radley Road. In 1974, the sanctuary was renovated. It was designed by Austin Winkley. On 16 November 1974, the new altar was consecrated. In 1982, a former school building, called St Edmund’s Lodge, was turned to a parish hall.

== Parish ==
Our Lady and St Edmund's Church is its own parish since 2006 has been in partnership with the other Catholic parishes of Didcot, Wallingford, Hinksey, and East Hendred. Our Lady and St Edmund's Church has four Sunday Masses at 8:45am, 10:15am and 6:30pm, with a Mass in Polish at 2:00pm.

== See also ==
- Media related to Church of Our Lady and St Edmund, Abingdon at Wikimedia Commons
- Hospital of St John and St Elizabeth, also founded by George Bowyer.
- Our Lady's Abingdon
