= St Joseph's Church, Stokesley =

Church in Stokesley, North Yorkshire, England

Coordinates: 54.475137°N 1.187135°W

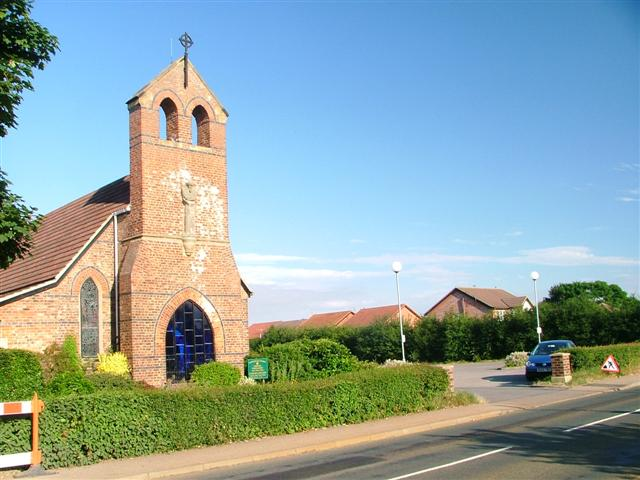
The church, in 2005

St Joseph's Church is a Catholic church in Stokesley, a town in North Yorkshire, in England.

In 1743, a Catholic chapel was opened in an outbuilding of Stokesley Manor House, but it was destroyed in anti-Catholic riots in 1746. The town was without a Catholic place of worship until 1860, when a mission chapel was established in a former hayloft at the Angel Inn. In 1870, Apollonia Bland donated £1,000 for the construction of a church. A building was designed by George Goldie and was constructed between 1872 and 1873. Together with the presbytery, the construction cost £1,500, and on completion the building could seat 252 worshippers. The church suffered a fire in the 1970s, and was then restored and reordered and a north aisle was added by F. Swainston & Associates.

The church is constructed of red brick, with black bricks above and between the windows, and has a roof of concrete tiles. It consists of a nave with a north aisle and sanctuary. There are buttresses on the south side, added in the 1970s, and the west end has a double bellcote. The altar consists of three blocks of sandstone, and the font of a single block, all installed in the 1970s. There is bench seating, and some stained glass installed in the 1940s, to designs by G. S. Walsh.
