= St Patrick's Church, Bradford =

Roman Catholic Church in Bradford, England

St Patrick's Church
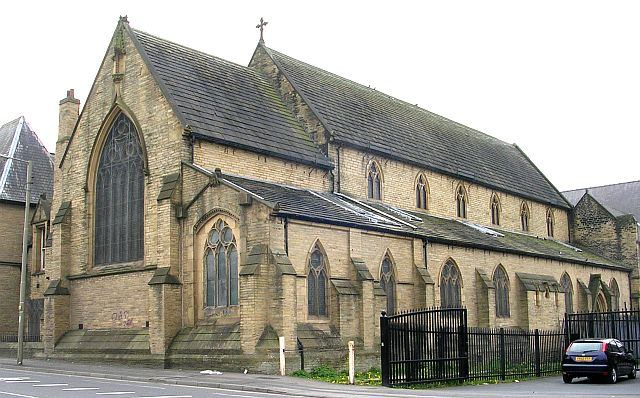
- St Patrick's Church
- 53.7975°N 1.7629°W
- OS grid reference: SE 15716 33495
- Location: Bradford
- Country: England
- Denomination: Roman Catholic
- Website: www.stpatricksmission.co.uk

History
- Status: Parish church
- Dedication: Saint Patrick
- Consecrated: 11 July 1903

Architecture
- Functional status: Active
- Heritage designation: Grade II listed
- Designated: 9 August 1983
- Architect: George Goldie
- Groundbreaking: 1852
- Completed: 13 July 1853

Administration
- Province: Liverpool
- Diocese: Leeds
- Deanery: Bradford
- Parish: St Joseph's Bradford

St Patrick's Church is a Roman Catholic church in Bradford, West Yorkshire, England. It was built from 1852 to 1853 and designed by George Goldie. It is situated on the corner of Sedgfield Terrace and Westgate in the city centre. To the south and west of the church is Rebecca Street and Vaughan Street. The church is the oldest Roman Catholic church still in use in the city and is a Grade II listed building.

== History ==
=== Foundation ===
In 1825, the original St Mary's Church was the first Roman Catholic church to be built in Bradford after the reformation. It was rebuilt from 1874 to 1876, but closed in 2008.

St Patrick's Church was founded by Canon Thomas Harrison who was priest at St Mary's Church. In 1850, he went about buying the site for St Patrick's Church. He had to buy the land through an intermediary because of the anti-Catholic sentiment in the city.

=== Construction ===
In 1852, building work started on the church. It was designed by George Goldie. On 13 July 1853, the church was opened by the Bishop of Beverley, John Briggs. In 1855, it became its own parish.

In the 1860s, the interior decoration of the church was completed. In 1866, a neighbouring presbytery was built and in 1869 a south porch was added to the church.

=== Consecration ===
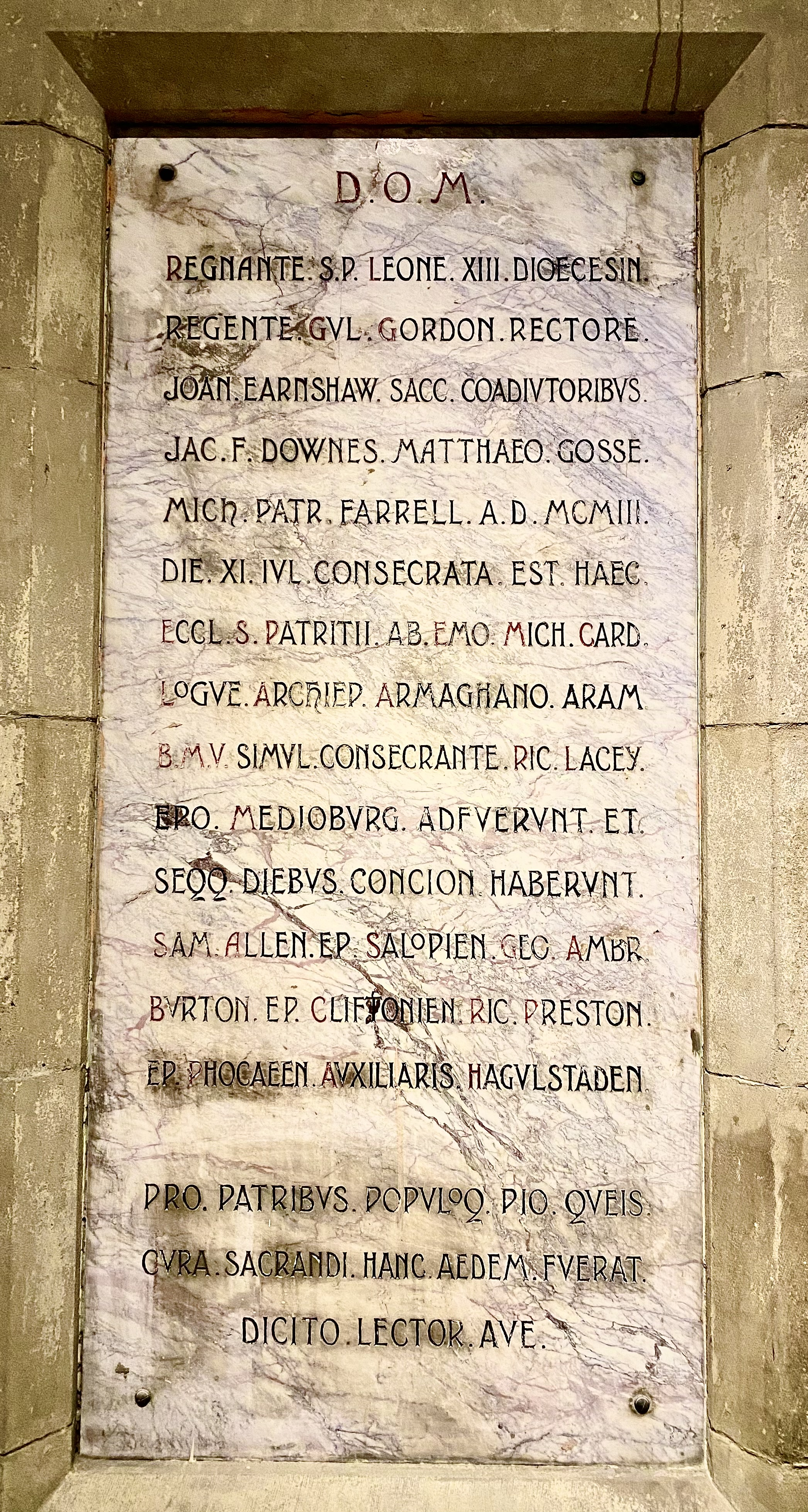
Dedication Stone in St. Patrick's Church, Bradford.

On 11 July 1903, after the debt from the construction had been paid off, the church was consecrated. The solemn liturgical rites of the dedication of the church were presided over by Michael Cardinal Logue, the Archbishop of Armagh. The altar of Our Lady in the side chapel of the church was consecrated by Richard Lacy, the Bishop of Middlesbrough. The details of the consecration are given in Latin on the dedication stone in the church, which is translated as follows:

To God, Most Good, Most Great

During the reign of the Holy Father Leo XIII, in the diocese led by William Gordon, under the rectorship of John Earnshaw, with the assistance of priests James F. Downes, Matthew Gosse, and Michael Patrick Farrell, in the year of Our Lord 1903, on the 11th day of July, this Church of St. Patrick was consecrated by His Eminence Michael Cardinal Logue, Archbishop of Armagh. The Altar of the Blessed Virgin Mary was at the same time consecrated by Richard Lacey, Bishop of Middlesbrough. On the following days, sermons were given by Samuel Allen, Bishop of Shrewsbury, George Ambrose Burton, Bishop of Clifton, and Richard Preston, Lord of the See of Phocoea and Auxiliary Bishop of Hexham and Newcastle.

For the fathers and the pious people to whom was entrusted the duty of consecrating this church, let the reader say an “Ave.”

=== Developments ===
Between 1968 and 1972, following the Second Vatican Council, the interior was reordered.

Next door to the church is St Pio Friary, where the Franciscan Friars of the Renewal are based. They serve the congregation of St Patrick's Church and operate a local soup kitchen.

== Parish ==
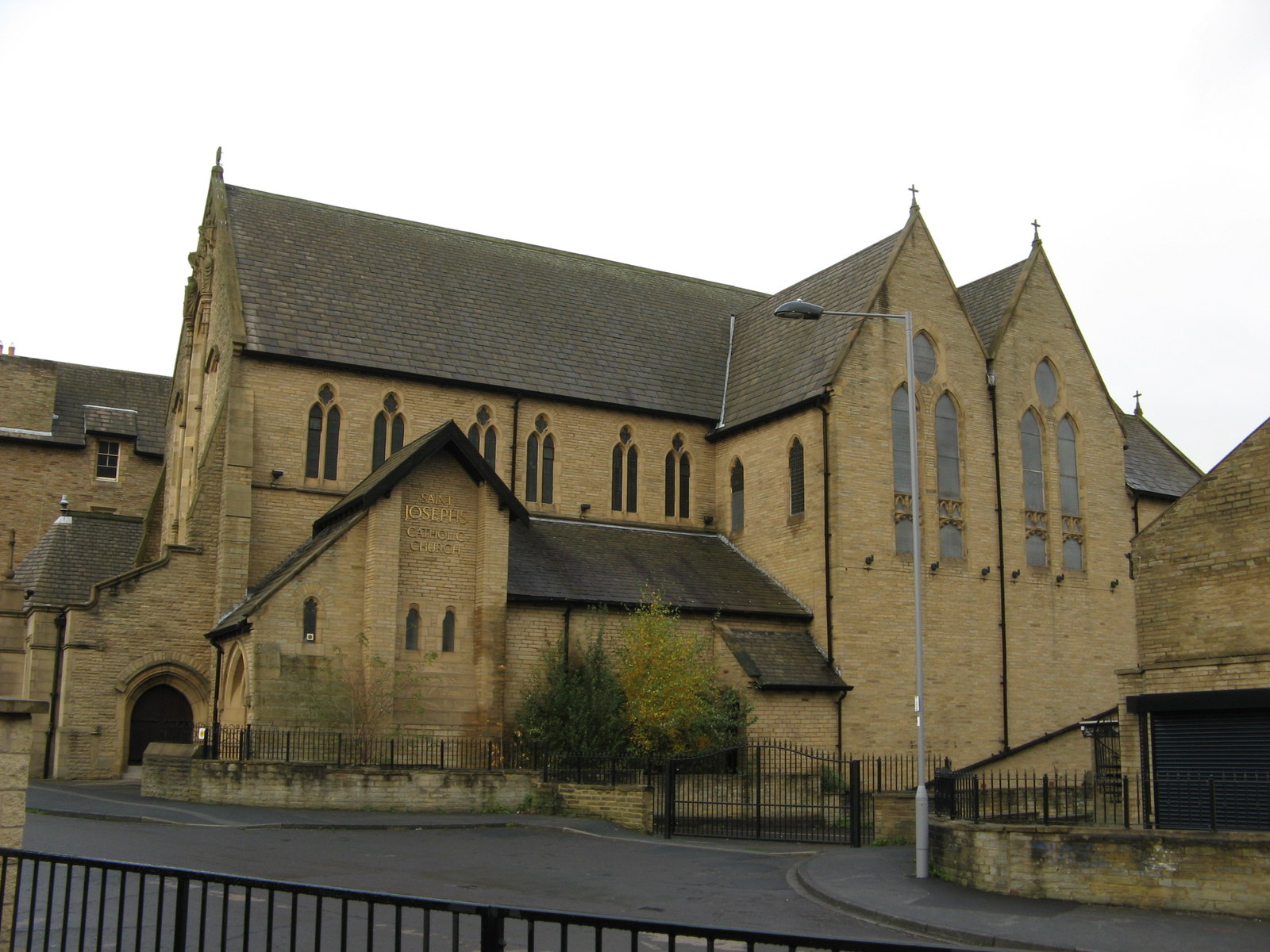
St Joseph's Church, in the same parish of St Patrick's.

=== St Joseph's Church ===
Since 2009, St Patrick's Church has been a Mission church in the parish of St Joseph, centred at St Joseph's Church, which is on the corner of Pakington Street and Manchester Road (53.7826°N 1.7586°W). It is a Grade II listed building and was designed by Edward Simpson. Construction on the church began in 1885. It was opened on 14 September 1887. The church was consecrated on 14 September 1937. It cost approximately £7,000. In the 1930s, internal alterations were made by the architect J. H. Langtry-Langton. In 1964, the church was extended under the supervision of his son, Peter Langtry-Langton. On 24 September 2009, the Shrine of the Annunciation of Our Lady of Bradford was established in the church. In 2016, the church became a centre for the celebration of the Tridentine Mass in the area.

St Joseph's Church is also the base for the Catholic chaplaincy to the University of Bradford and Bradford College.

== See also ==
- Roman Catholic Diocese of Leeds
- Listed buildings in Bradford (City Ward)
