= Christ Church, Ugthorpe =

Church in Ugthorpe, North Yorkshire, England

Coordinates: 54.489°N 0.767°W

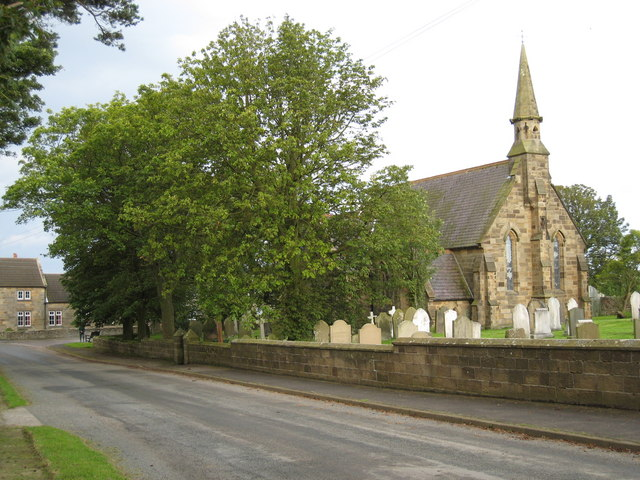
The church, in 2007

Christ Church is the parish church of Ugthorpe, a village in North Yorkshire, in England.

Ugthorpe was long in the parish of St Oswald's Church, Lythe. A church was constructed in the village between 1855 and 1857, to a 13th-century neo-Gothic design by Henry Edward Coe and Edwin Morton Goodwin. On completion, it had seating for 282 worshippers. The village was made a district chapelry in 1868, and later became its own parish.

The cruciform church consists of a nave, chancel and transepts, with a vestry and porch. There is a small octagonal spire at the west end.
