= St Mungo's Church, Glasgow =

Coordinates: 55.8657°N 4.2381°W

St Mungo's Church
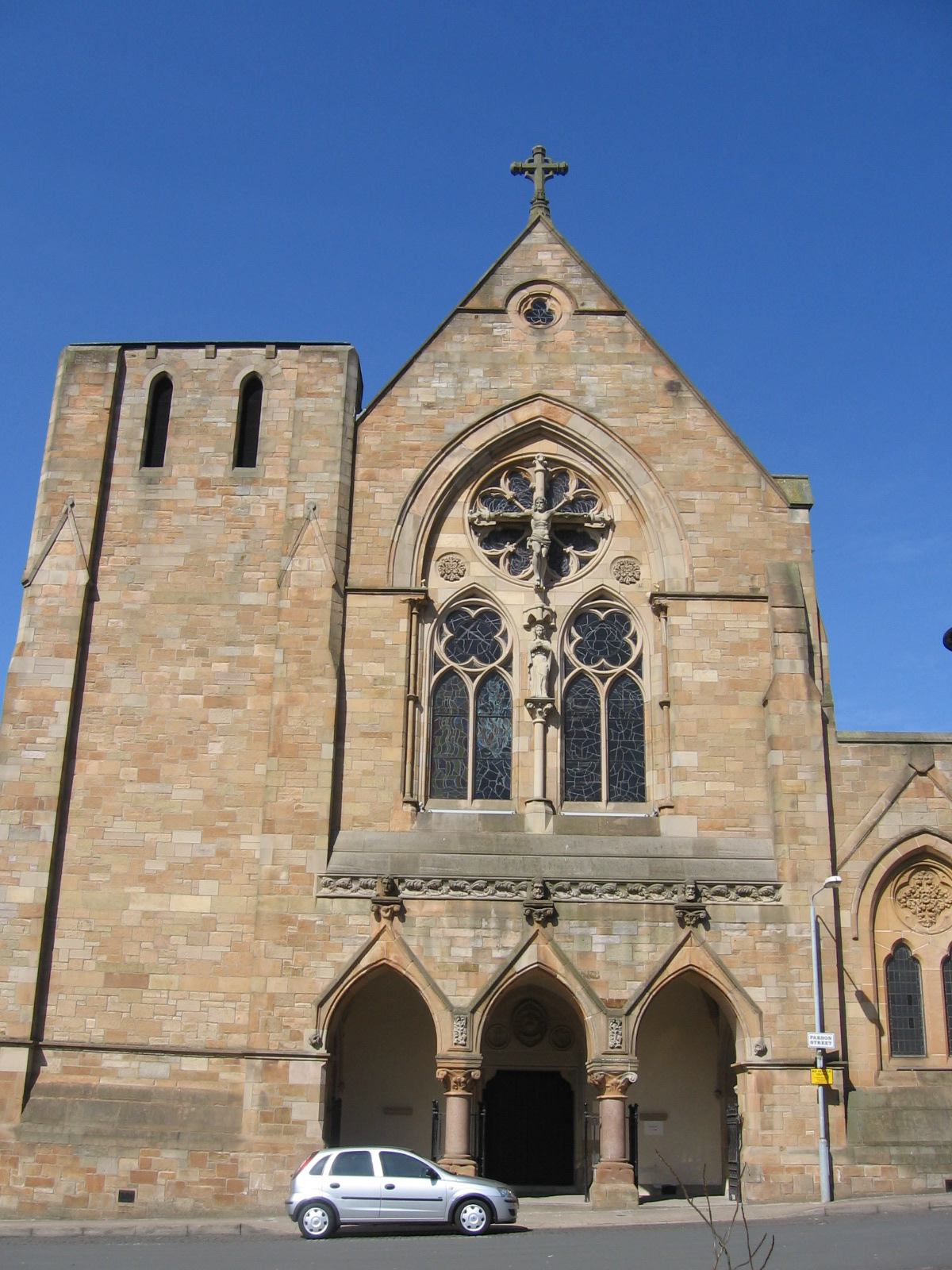

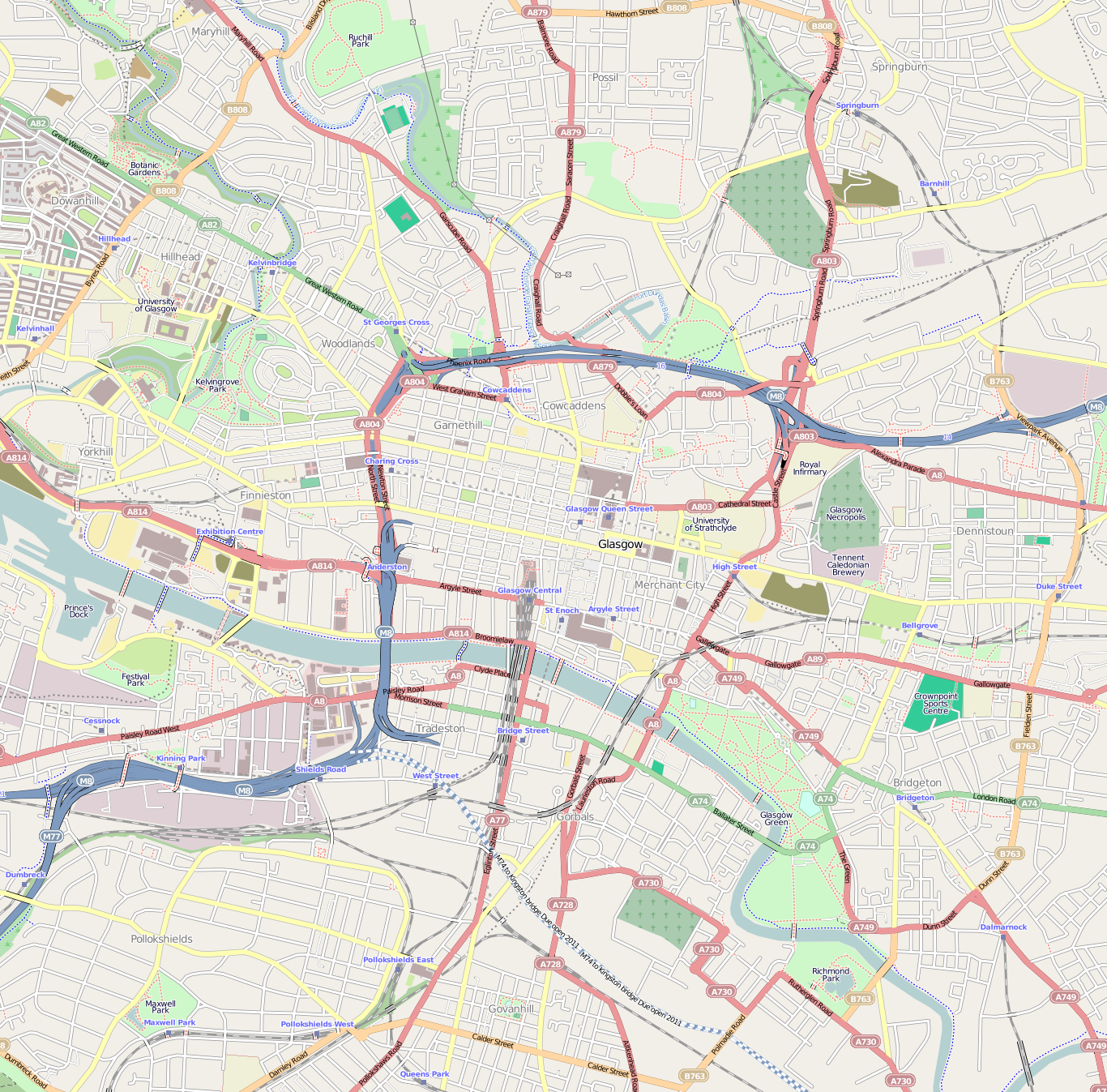
- Location in Glasgow
- Location: Townhead, Glasgow
- Country: Scotland
- Denomination: Roman Catholic
- Website: St Mungo's, Townhead

History
- Status: Parish church
- Dedication: Saint Mungo

Architecture
- Functional status: Active
- Heritage designation: Category B listed
- Designated: 4 September 1989
- Architect: George Goldie
- Style: Gothic Revival
- Groundbreaking: 1841
- Completed: 1877

Administration
- Province: Glasgow
- Archdiocese: Glasgow
- Deanery: North

St Mungo's Church is a Roman Catholic Parish Church in the Townhead area of Glasgow, Scotland. It was built in 1841, with later work done on the church in 1877, and designed by George Goldie. It is situated on the corner of Parson Street and Glebe Street, east of St Mungo's Catholic Primary School and west of the Springburn Road. It was founded by the Passionists, is a Gothic Revival church and is a category B listed building. Aside from Glasgow Cathedral, it is one of only two churches in Townhead that survived the slum clearances of the 1950s and 1960s, the other being the Barony Church on nearby Castle Street, which is now an events space for the University of Strathclyde.

== History ==
The church was first built in 1841. The architect was George Goldie. He built the church in the Italian Gothic architectural style. Nine years later, the church became the centre of a parish. In 1865, the Passionists arrived in Scotland. They came from Ireland and began to minister to the parish. From St Mungo's Church, the Passionists went out and ministered to Catholics in other parts of Scotland, such as St Joseph's Church in Helensburgh in 1867. In 1877, the church was altered, again to the designs of George Goldie.

In 1899, the parish of St Stephen's Church in Sighthill became part of the same parish as St Mungo's and the Passionists minister to both churches.

== Parish ==
Next to the church, to the east, is St Mungo's Retreat. In addition, to the north is the parish hall that acts as a day centre.

The church has four Sunday Masses they are at 6:00pm on Saturday and 10:00am, 12 noon and 7:00pm on Sunday. There are also weekday Masses at 10:00am and 12:15pm.

== Exterior ==
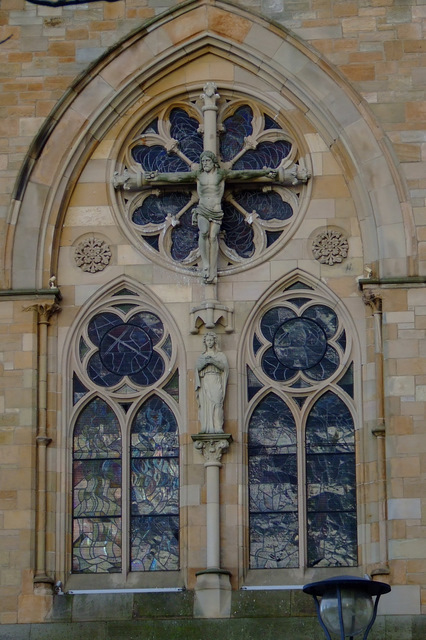
Front window

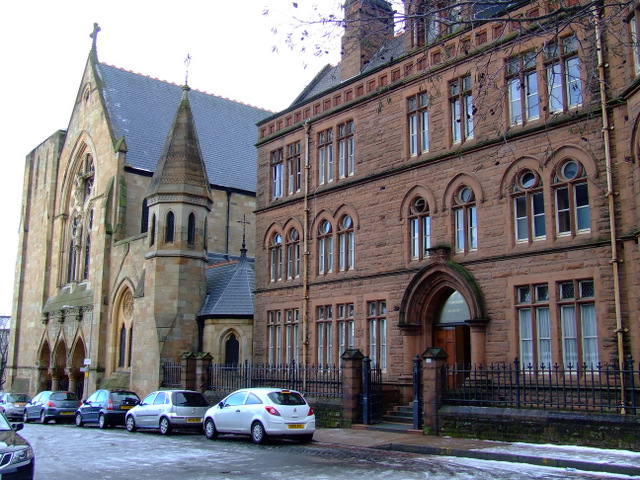
St Mungo's Retreat

== See also ==
- Roman Catholic Archdiocese of Glasgow
- Passionists
