= St Paul's Church, Hyde =

Church in Greater Manchester, England

Coordinates: 53.4562°N 2.0702°W

St Paul's Church
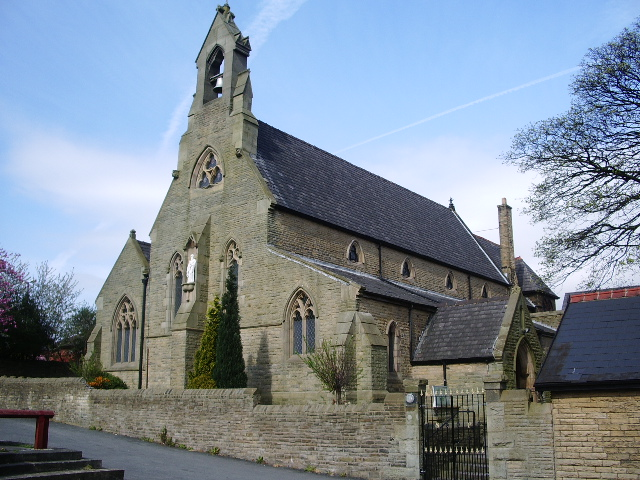
- St Paul's Church
- OS grid reference: SJ 95432 95491
- Location: Hyde
- Country: England
- Denomination: Roman Catholic
- Website: StMaryandStPaul.org

History
- Status: Active
- Founded: 1848
- Dedication: Paul the Apostle
- Consecrated: 1954

Architecture
- Functional status: Parish church
- Heritage designation: Grade II listed
- Designated: 21 August 2013
- Architect(s): Hadfield, Weightman & Goldie
- Style: Gothic Revival
- Groundbreaking: 20 May 1853
- Completed: 21 June 1854
- Construction cost: £1,560

Administration
- Province: Birmingham
- Diocese: Shrewsbury
- Deanery: Stockport & Tameside
- Parish: St Mary and St Paul

St Paul's Church is a Catholic parish church in Hyde, Tameside, Greater Manchester, England. It was built from 1853 to 1854 and designed by Matthew Ellison Hadfield, John Grey Weightman and George Goldie. Architecturally, it is in the Gothic Revival style. It is located on Newman Street, close to the west of Newton for Hyde railway station. In 2013, it was designated a Grade II listed building.

== History ==
=== Foundation ===
In 1822, a mission was started in nearby Dukinfield. Catholics in Hyde had to travel there for Mass. In 1825, a chapel, in the Greek Revival style was built on Astley Street. It was designed by John Palmer. In 1847, that church was demolished because of mining subsistence, and replaced by the current St Mary's Church in Dukinfield in 1856, designed by Matthew Ellison Hadfield. Priests would travel from that church to the surrounding area and founded further missions and chapels. They would go on to found other churches such as St Peter's Church in Stalybridge in 1838, St Ann's Church in Ashton-under-Lyne, and the mission in Hyde in 1848. That year, in Hyde, a place of worship was created over a blacksmith's shop. A Fr John Quealy would come from Ashton-under-Lyne to celebrate Mass there.

=== Construction ===
Land for the church was given by a local Unitarian, Robert Ashton, who owned Hyde Print Works. On 20 May 1853, the foundation stone of St Paul's Church was laid. The architects were from the firm of Weightman, Hadfield & Goldie, consisting of Matthew Ellison Hadfield, John Grey Weightman and George Goldie. Construction was done by the building firm Messrs F. Robinson & Son. The church was built in the Gothic Revival style. In total, the cost of building the church came to £1,560. On 21 June 1854, the church was opened.

=== Developments ===
Various additions were made to the church over the decades after its construction. The chancel and lady chapel were added before 1899. The priest at the time was a Fr Hennelly. The two additions were designed by Edmund Kirby and the combined cost of both of them came to just over £1,000. In 1925, the high altar was installed. In 1926, the reredos was added. The priest was a Canon Marrs, and again both features were designed by Kirby. In 1954, the centenary of the church was celebrated and the church was consecrated. Around that time, a new later was installed in the lay chapel, it was designed by Adrian Gilbert Scott. In 1979, while Canon Turnbull was the priest, there was reordering work done in the church.

== Parish ==
St Mary's Church in Dukinfield and St Paul's Church in Hyde are now part of the same parish. There are three schools in the parish: St Mary's Catholic Primary School in Dukinfield, St Paul's Catholic Primary School in Hyde and All Saints Catholic College, Dukinfield. St Paul's Church has its Sunday Mass at 9:00 am, with an additional vigil Mass at 6:00 pm Saturday, and St Mary's Church in Dukinfield has Sunday Mass at 11:00 am on Sunday.

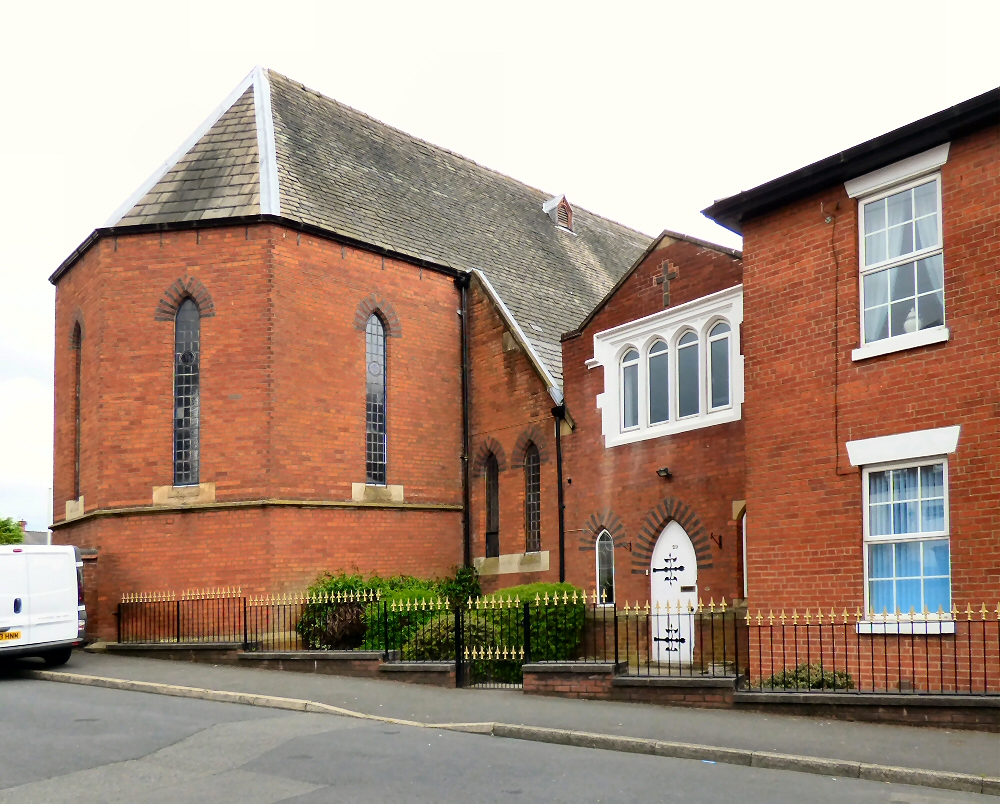
St Mary's Church in Dukinfield, in the same parish as St Paul's

== See also ==
- Diocese of Shrewsbury
