= Nicholas Rigby =

British priest

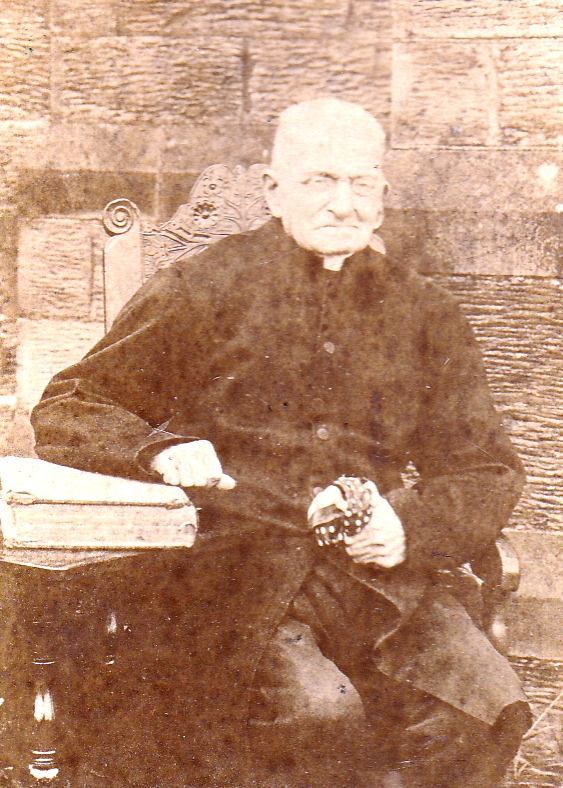
Nicholas Rigby sitting outside St Anne's church, Ugthorpe

Nicholas Rigby (1800 – 7 September 1886), was an English Roman Catholic priest.

== Biography ==
Rigby was born in Walton-le-Dale near Preston, Lancashire. At the age of twelve he went to Ushaw College, where he was for a time professor of elocution.

Ordained priest in September, 1826, Rigby was sent to St. Mary's, Wycliffe, for six months, and was then given the united missions of Egton Bridge and Ugthorpe. After seven years the two missions were again separated, and he took up his residence at Ugthorpe. There he built a church (opened in 1855), started a new cemetery, and founded a middle-class college.

About 1884, Rigby resigned the mission work to his curate, E. J. Hickey. He died at Ugthorpe. His obituary notice, in the Catholic Times of 17 September 1886, gives a sketch of his life.

== Publications ==
- The Real Doctrine of the Church on Scripture, to which is added an account of the conversion of the Duke of Brunswick (Anton Ulrich, 1710)
- Father Ignatius Spencer (1830), (York, 1834), dedicated to Benedict Rayment.
- Other works, chiefly treatises on primary truths, or sermons of a controversial character, are described in Joseph Gillow, Bibl. Dict. Eng. Cath.
