= Ugthorpe =

Village and civil parish in North Yorkshire, England

Coordinates: 54°29′22″N 0°46′12″W

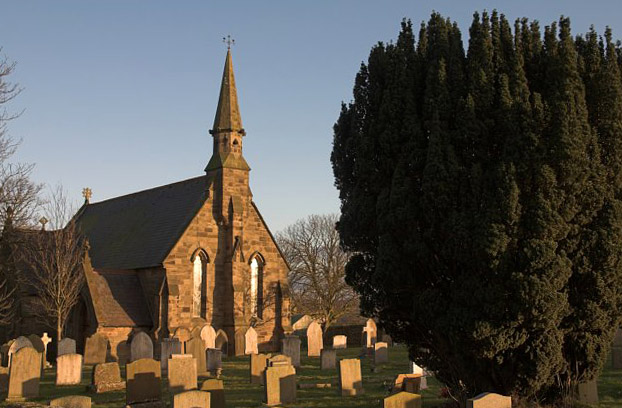
- Christ Church, Ugthorpe

- Location within North Yorkshire
- Population: 225 (Including Hutton Mulgrave. 2011 census)
- OS grid reference: NZ798111
- Unitary authority: North Yorkshire
- Ceremonial county: North Yorkshire
- Region: Yorkshire and the Humber
- Country: England
- Sovereign state: United Kingdom
- Post town: WHITBY
- Postcode district: YO21
- Police: North Yorkshire
- Fire: North Yorkshire
- Ambulance: Yorkshire
- UK Parliament: Scarborough and Whitby

Ugthorpe is a village and civil parish situated near Whitby, North Yorkshire, England. According to the 2011 UK census, Ugthorpe parish had a population of 225, an increase on the 2001 UK census figure of 201.

From 1974 to 2023 it was part of the Borough of Scarborough, it is now administered by the unitary North Yorkshire Council.

== History ==
The name Ugthorpe derives from the Old Norse Uggiþorp meaning 'Uggi's secondary settlement'.

Ugthorpe was an ancient demesne of the Crown, and is styled in the Domesday Book as Ughetorp. The Mauleys became lords here at an early period, and from them the manor and estate descended by marriage to the Bigods, and afterwards to the Ratcliffes, by whom the whole estate was sold in parcels. The village is situated in the western part of the parish, north of the road between Whitby and Guisborough.

=== Catholic Recusant history ===
==== Blessed Nicholas Postgate ====
In 1596, Blessed Nicholas Postgate, a Catholic priest and martyr, was born and lived in a humble home, now called The Hermitage, at Ugthorpe. He studied at Douay College, France, becoming a priest in 1628. He worked secretly as a priest in a wide area of Yorkshire, finally settling back to Ugthorpe in the 1660s. He is one of the 85 English Catholic Martyrs of England and Wales beatified by Pope John Paul II in November 1987.

Although anti-Catholic feeling had subsided a good deal, it flared up again due to the fake Popish Plot of 1678; this followed a false testimony from Titus Oates in which he claimed there was a conspiracy to instal a Catholic king, and he managed to foment a renewed and fierce persecution of English Catholics. It was to be the last time that Catholics were put to death in England for their faith; one of the last victims – but not the very last – was Nicholas Postgate.

During the panic engineered by Oates, a prominent Protestant magistrate in London, Sir Edmund Berry Godfrey, was murdered and Oates loudly blamed the Catholics; Sir Edmund's manservant, John Reeves, set out to get his revenge. For reasons which are not clear, he decided to base his actions in the Whitby area, possibly because he knew that priests arrived there from France.

Nicholas Postgate was arrested at Redbarns Farm, Ugglebarnby, near Whitby, where he was to carry out a baptism. Reeves, with a colleague called William Cockerill, raided the house during the ceremony and caught the priest, then aged 82. He was tried for treason in York and then hanged, disembowelled and quartered.

Every year since 1974 an open-air service has been held – alternately in Egton Bridge and Ugthorpe – in honour of Fr Postgate.

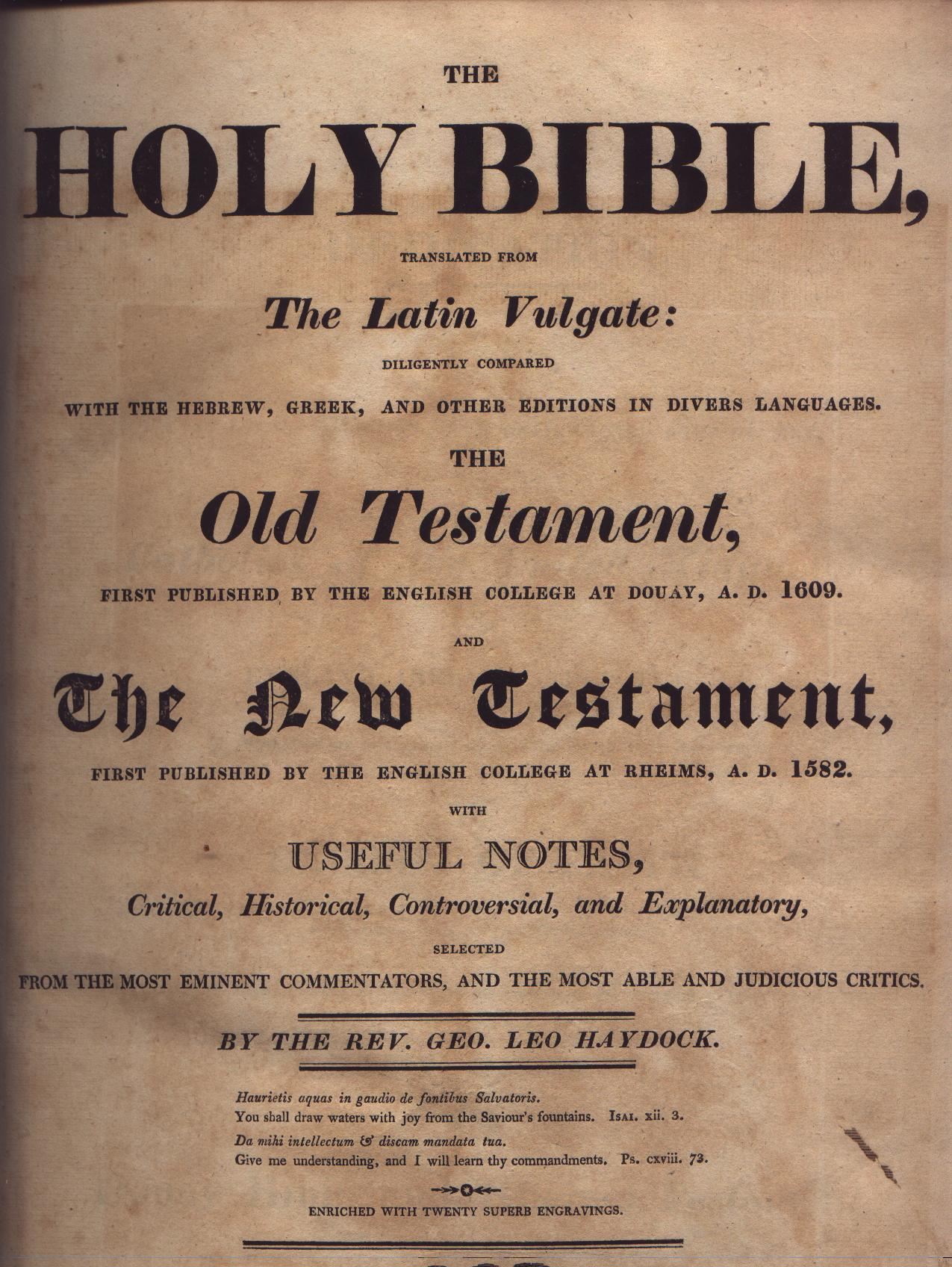
Title page to the first edition of the Haydock Bible, published by Thomas Haydock, Manchester, 1811

==== Father George Haydock ====
Early in the 19th century, while the anti-Catholic Penal Laws were still in effect, Ugthorpe was the location of a mission for Catholic Recusants. From 1803 to 1827, it was presided over by Father George Leo Haydock (1774–1849). While serving there, he completed an extensive body of annotations to his edition of the Douay Bible, which became known as The Haydock Bible, published by his brother, Thomas, in 1811, and remaining in print to this day.

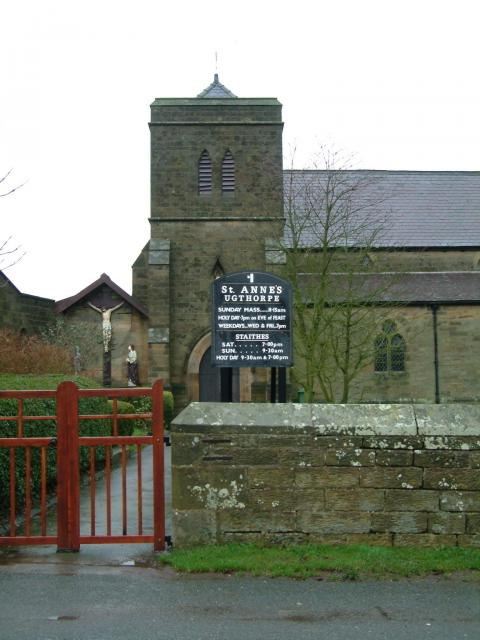
St Annes Catholic Church, Ugthorpe

==== St Anne's Catholic Church ====
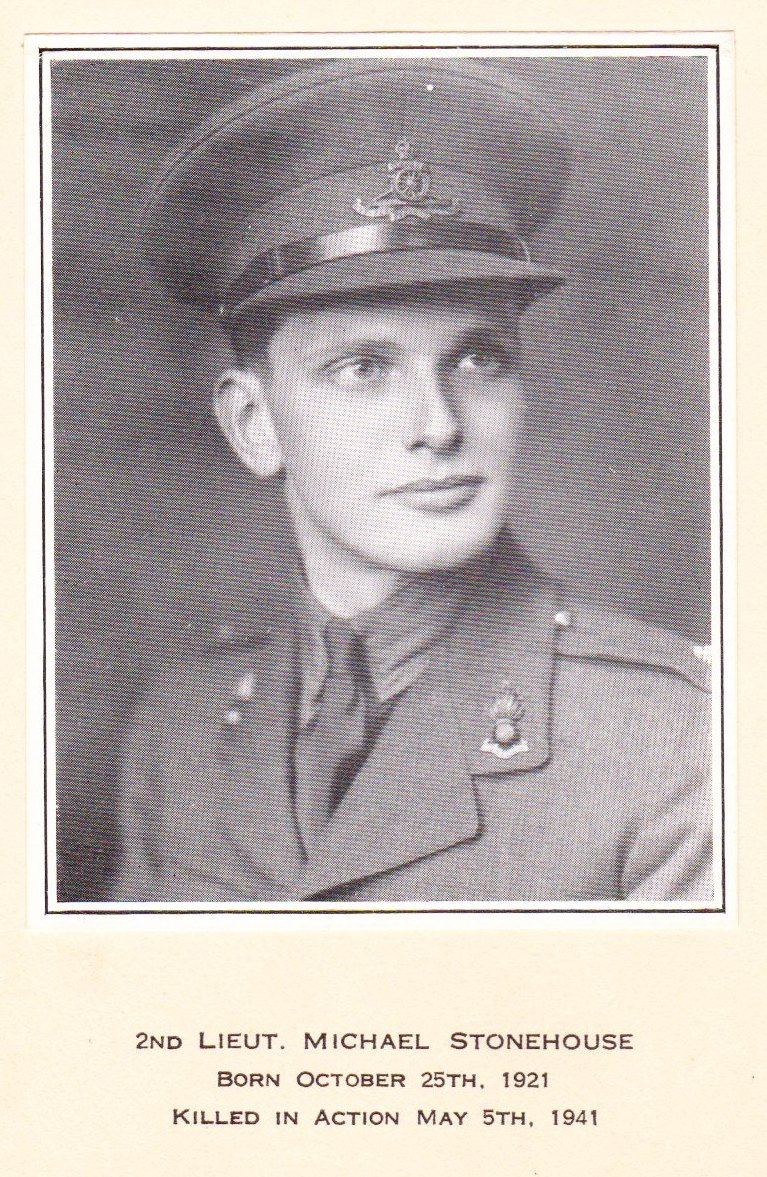
2nd Lieut. Michael Stonehouse (bn 25 October 1921). Lived at Ugthorpe House, Ugthorpe before joining the RAF. He was killed in action on 5 May 1941. There is a memorial to him within the grounds of Christ Church.

The Catholic St Anne's Church, Ugthorpe is situated in the centre of the village. This church was built by Haydock's successor, Rev Nicholas Rigby (1800 – 7 September 1886) and opened in 1855, it is still in regular use. Fr. Rigby established a new cemetery and founded a college which later became the church hall. About 1884 Rev Rigby handed over the priestly duties to his curate, the Rev. E. J. Hickey.

There was an earlier Catholic church here, built around 1812.

=== Other facts ===
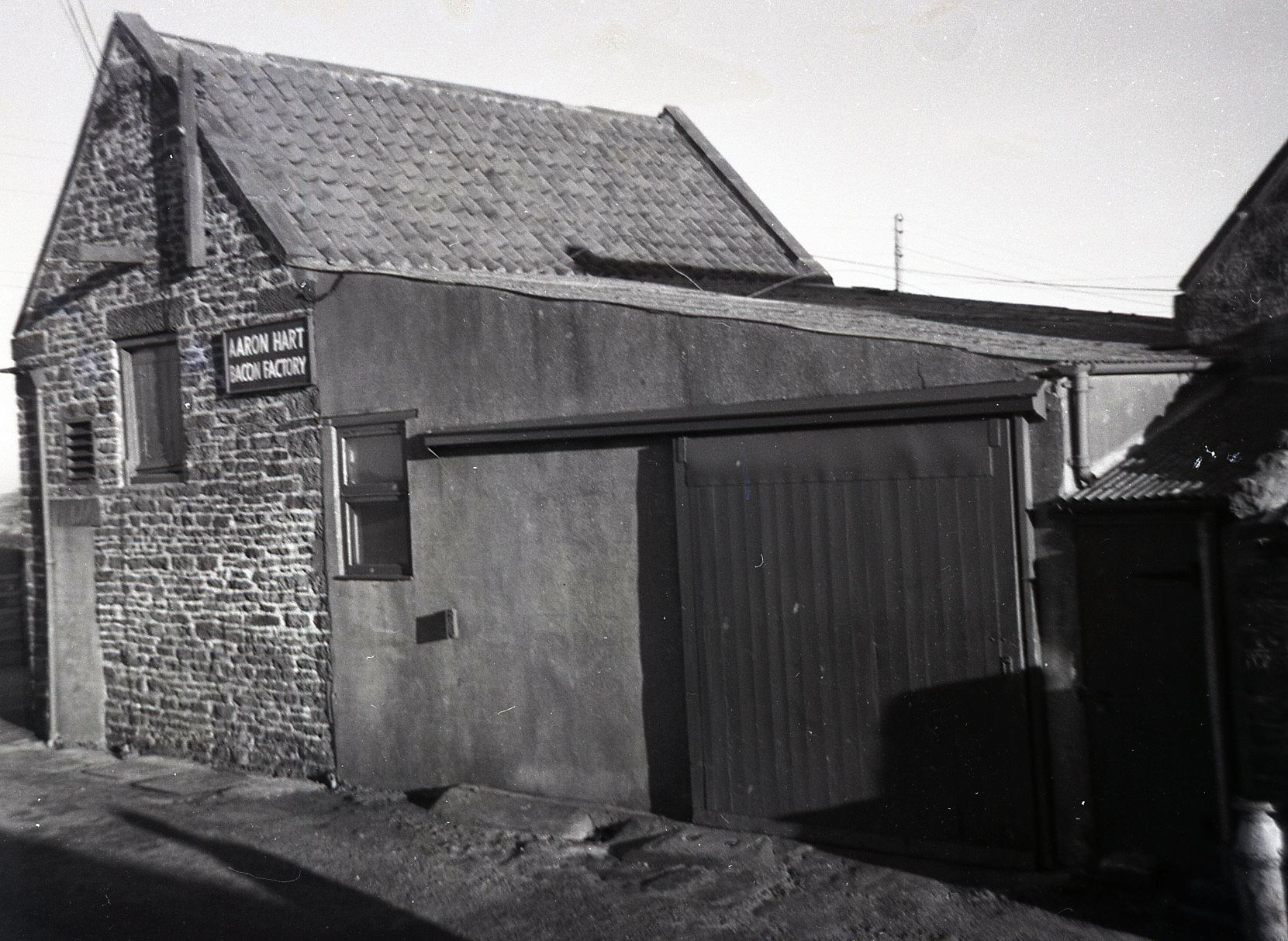
Aaron Hart's Bacon Factory in 1973

The village windmill has long been converted into a residence and no longer grinds corn. In the 1930s, Ugthorpe had two cobblers, a watchmaker, a joiner and a bacon factory with its own slaughterhouse. The slaughterhouse operated until the mid-1970s and was owned and run by Alice and Dinis Hart; the business was continued by their son and after that their grandson, both called Aaron Hart. Originally the slaughterhouse and factory were at White House, later moving to a site near the Black Bull Inn. Pigs were slaughtered each Tuesday and their meat was prepared and sold from the premises, at Whitby, and around the neighbouring villages. The building is still often referred to as the Bacon House but has now been converted into a house.

William Fawkes (1930–2023) was a teacher of the deaf who did pioneering work in teaching music to deaf children on a large scale basis. William lived in Ugthorpe from 1988 to 2018.

Dorothy Fawkes (1935–2012) who was born in the village, was the daughter of Aaron Hart and the wife of William Fawkes. She was previously the Deputy Principal of Norland Nursery Training College at Hungerford in Berkshire.

== See also ==
- Listed buildings in Ugthorpe
