= St Ninian's Catholic Church, Wooler =

Church in Wooler, Northumberland, England

Coordinates: 55.547705°N 2.018506°W

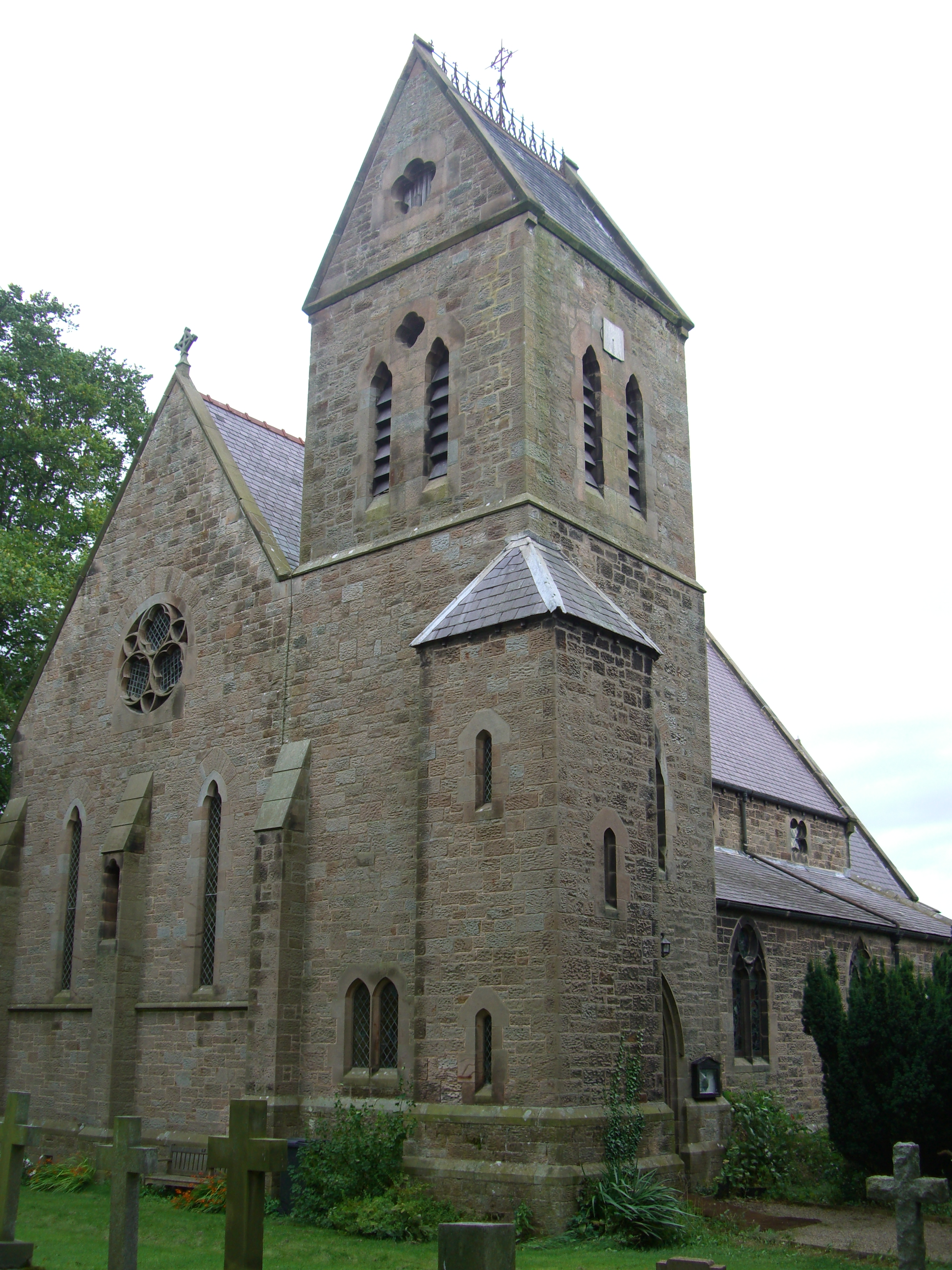

St Ninian’s church is a Catholic place of worship situated on Burnhouse Road in the town of Wooler in Northumberland, England. It is a Grade II listed building and is within the Catholic Diocese of Hexham and Newcastle.

== History ==
=== Early Catholic mission ===
Post-Reformation Catholic worship in Wooler dates from 1792 when a Catholic mission was founded by Mrs Jane Silvertop in a chapel on the top floor of her house she had renamed St Ninian‘s. A priest lived within the house, which stands on present day Ryecroft Way. After the death of Mrs Silvertop it became the presbytery for the town of Wooler until 1850 when Bishop William Hogarth converted it into a Diocesan Mission Centre in one of his first acts as the newly installed Catholic Bishop of Hexham and Newcastle. The mission was badly damaged by fire in 1856 and the building reverted to being the presbytery for the new church which was being built just a few yards to the west. The presbytery was used as a hospital store in World War II and was sold by the church in 1974 to become the Loreto Guest House, in May 1986 it was designated as a Grade II listed building.

=== New church is built ===
The church was built in the Late Geometric style at a cost of £1305 by the architect George Goldie of the firm Weightman and Hadfield of Sheffield. The church was opened by Bishop Hogarth on 24 June 1856, it was described at the time by the Catholic publication “The Tablet” as ‘a severely simple building in harmony with the wild scenery around it’. Changes to the church over the years have included a reordering of the Sanctuary by Father Timney in 1974 and the glazing of the wooden tracery screen below the west gallery in 2012.

=== Architecture ===
The church is built from snecked stone (courses of stonework with smaller stones, or snecks, inserted at regular intervals) with a slate roof. The south west tower has a multi moulded pointed arch doorway with paired lancet windows at bell level, topped off by a steeply sloping roof with quatrefoils in the gables. The interior includes a very tall chancel arch. The multi sided Lady chapel stands at the end of the south aisle. The east window and the glass in the south aisle is by William Wailes and includes one dedicated to the architect George Goldie and his wife Madeleine de Kersadier and another which depicts Saint Ninian. The bell tower was designed for eight bells but has only ever had one, which has not been rung for many years.
