= George Goldie (architect) =

English architect

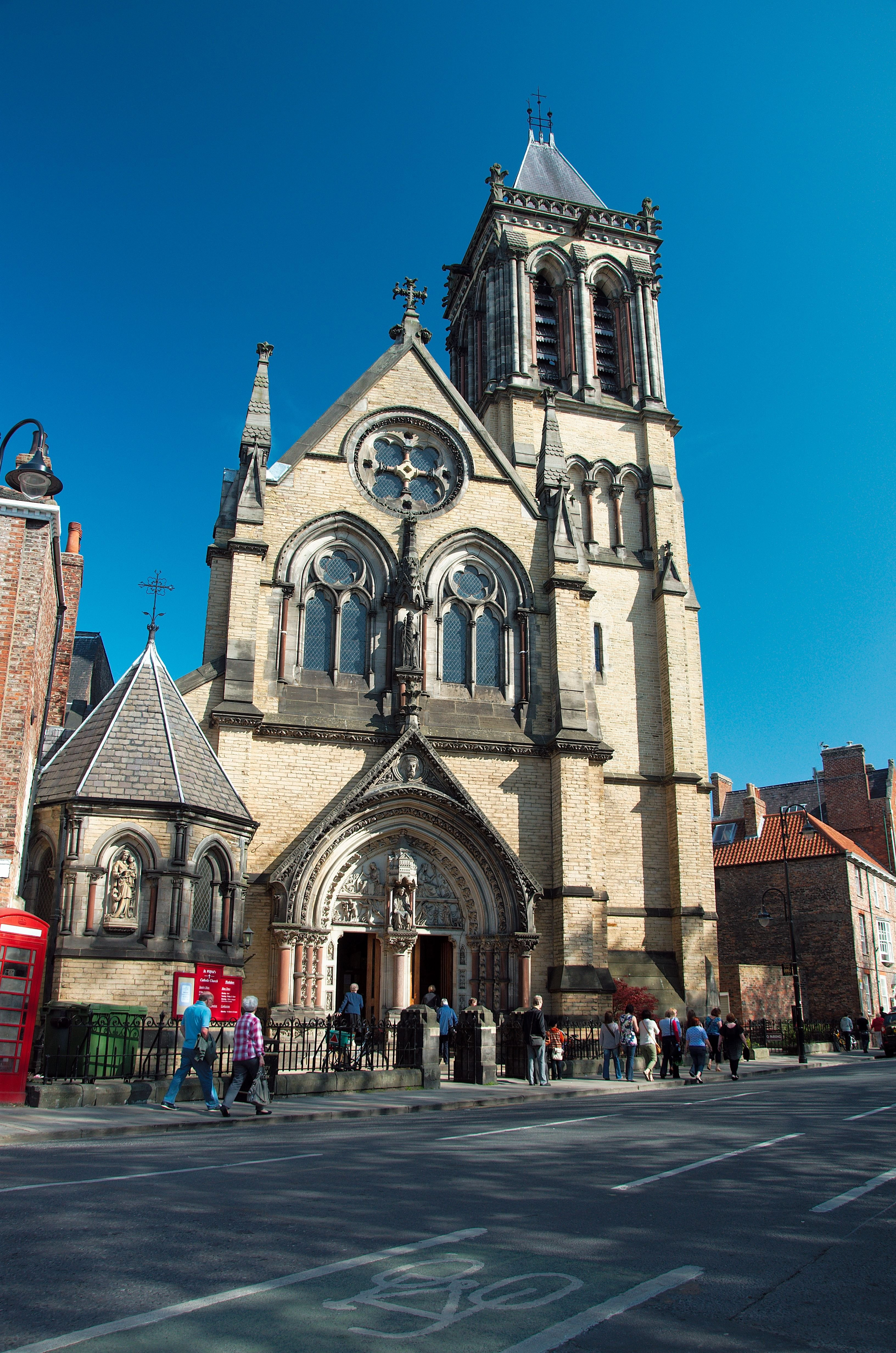
York Oratory

George Goldie (9 June 1828 – 1 March 1887) was an English ecclesiastical architect who specialised in Roman Catholic churches.

== Life ==
Goldie was born in York, the maternal grandson of the architect Joseph Bonomi the Elder. His paternal grandparents were George Sharpe Goldie and Sophia McDougall Osborne. After the death of her husband, Sophie went to Rouen and converted to Catholicism.

His father, also named George, became a medical doctor and was active in the Catholic Emancipation movement. In 1828, Dr. Goldie married Mary Anne Bonomi, daughter of Joseph Bonomi. Bonomi had a son, Ignatius, who would also become an architect. Dr. and Mrs. Goldie had nine children, three of whom died at a young age. George had five siblings: Francis, an artist, Very Rev. Mgr. Edward Canon Goldie, Rev. Fr. Francis Goldie, S.J. and Mary, nun who resided at St. Mary's Convent, York, as Mother Mary Walburga and Catherine who also became a nun in the same convent and adopted the name Mary but died at the age of twenty-eight.

Goldie was educated at St Cuthbert's College, Ushaw, County Durham. He was a student there when Augustus Pugin was working on the Chapel of St. Cuthbert. Goldie took such an interest that the two became friends, and it was Pugin who advised Goldie to study with Weightman and Hadfield.

From 1845 to 1850, he trained as an architect with John Grey Weightman and Matthew Ellison Hadfield of Sheffield, and thereafter worked in partnership with them. After Weightman left the partnership in 1858, Hadfield and Goldie remained partners for a further two years as "Hadfield & Goldie", practicing in Sheffield and London. From 1861 to 1867 Goldie was a solo practitioner in London when Charles Edwin Child (1843–1911) joined him in partnership as "Goldie & Child".

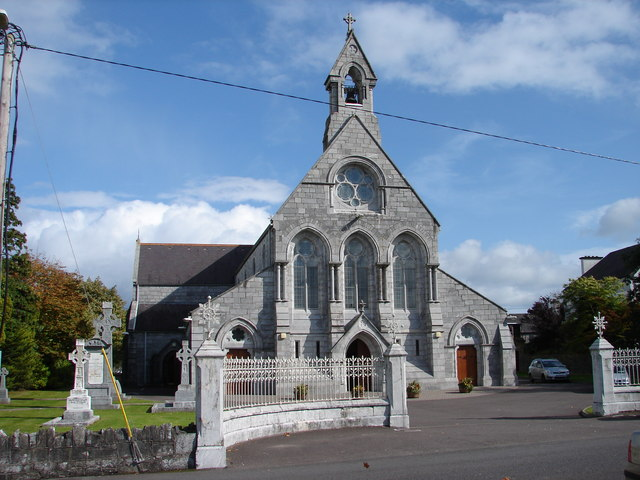
SS Mary and John church, Ballincollig, Ireland

Goldie was a native of York, where his father had been a prominent physician. He himself had been christened in St. Wilfrid's Chapel. When it came time to build a church, he designed it in Gothic Revival style. The arch over the main door has the most detailed Victorian carving in the city. It was considered to be "one of the most perfectly finished Catholic Churches in England, rich in sculpture, stained glass and fittings". St. Wilfrid's served as the pro-Cathedral of the Diocese of Beverley until 1878 when Beverley was split into dioceses of Leeds and Middlesbrough.

In 1880 Goldie's son Edward (1856–1921) entered the partnership, having first been apprenticed in 1875. The firm was then known as "Goldie Child & Goldie. Edward Goldie's work includes Hawkesyard Priory in Armitage, Staffordshire, built for the Dominican Order 1896–1914, and the church of Our Most Holy Redeemer and St Thomas More, Chelsea, built in 1895.

Goldie contributed articles on architectural subjects to The Month. In 1877, Pope Pius IX awarded George Goldie the Cross and Order of St. Sylvester for his work "as a Catholic architect." Around 1796 Joseph Bonomi designed the original Catholic chapel on the corner of Spanish Place and Charles Street. His Great-grandson, Edward, won the competition for its replacement, the present St James's, Spanish Place, which opened on Michaelmas Day, 1890.

Goldie married Mdlle de Kersabiec. They had a number of children. He retired, for health reasons, to Saint-Servan, Brittany, where he died after a brief illness. He was buried at Saint-Jouan-des-Guérets.

== Work ==
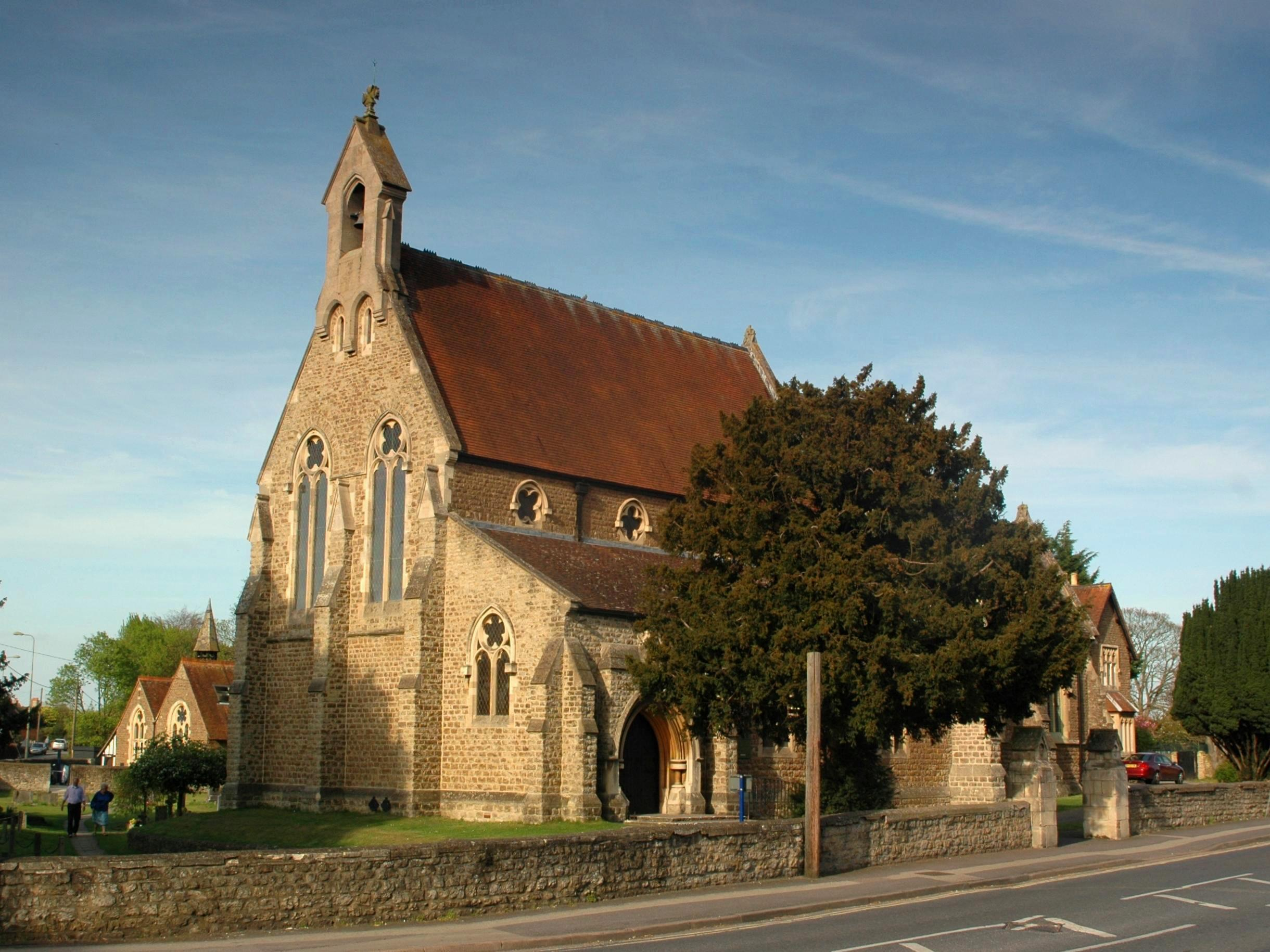
Our Lady and St Edmund Church, Abingdon-on-Thames

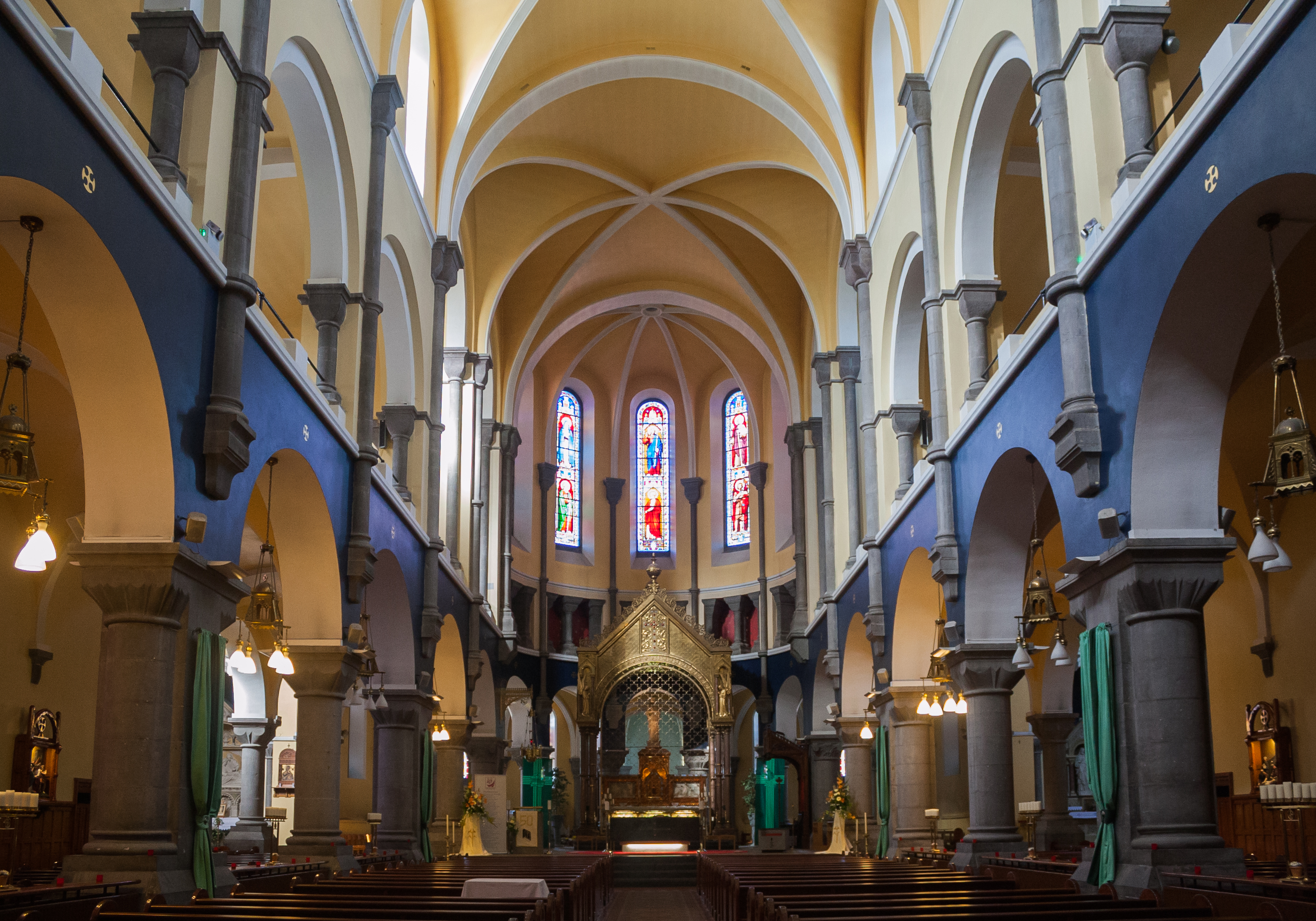
Interior of the Cathedral of the Immaculate Conception, Sligo

- Our Lady of Victories, Kensington (at the time of building, the Pro-Cathedral for the Archdiocese of Westminster)
- Reliquary at Bar Convent, York, where his two sisters were nuns
- Chapel of Carmel House, Nunnery Lane, Darlington, County Durham, 1848–54
- St Patrick's Church, Bradford, 1853
- St Paul's Church, Hyde, 1853-54
- Interior furnishings of St John's Cathedral, Salford including the reredos of 1853–55, together with the adjoining buildings, called "Cathedral House"
- Interior, Saint Mary's Dominican Church, Pope's Quay, Cork, Ireland, 1868-71

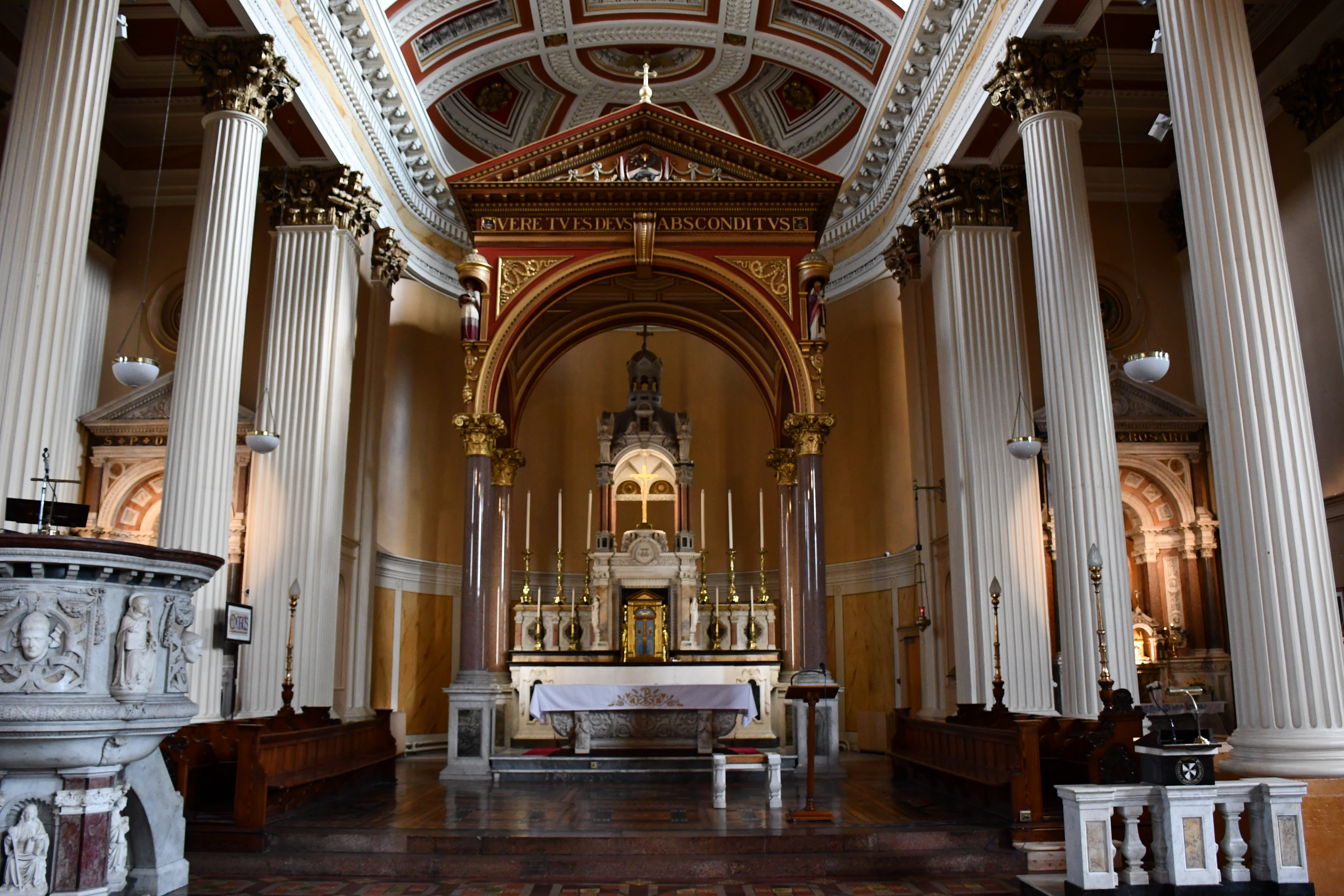
Interior, St. Mary's Roman Catholic Church, Pope's Quay, Cork Ireland. Designs: George Goldie, Architect.

- St Vincent's Church, Sheffield, 1856
- St Ninian's Church, Wooler, Northumberland, 1856
- Our Lady and St Edmund Church, Abingdon-on-Thames, 1857
- Convent of the Sisters of Mercy, Mount Vernon Street, Liverpool, 1857
- St Peter's Church, Scarborough, 1858
- Our Lady of the Garioch & St John the Evangelist, Fetternear, Aberdeenshire, 1859
- St Pancras Church, Ipswich, Suffolk, 1860 1861
- Ss Mary and Romuald, Yarm, North Yorkshire, 1860
- Additions and alterations to Pampisford Hall, Cambridgeshire, 1860
- York Oratory, 1862–64
- St. Scholastica's Abbey, Teignmouth, 1863
- St Mary and St Augustine, Stamford, Lincolnshire, 1864–65
- St. Ignatius Church, Wishaw, Lanarkshire, 1865
- Tower of St Edward King and Confessor Catholic Church, Clifford, Leeds, 1859–66
- Church of St Mary and St John, Ballincollig, County Cork, 1865–66
- St. Patrick's Church, Bandon, Co. Cork, Ireland, 1856-61.
- St John the Evangelist Catholic Church, Castle Douglas, Kirkcudbrightshire, Scotland, 1867.
- St. John's College, Waterford, 1868
- St Mary's Church, Stockton-on-Tees, chancel and aisle, 1870
- St Joseph's Church, Stokesley, North Yorkshire, 1873
- St. Robert's Church, Harrogate, 1873
- Cathedral of the Immaculate Conception, Sligo, 1874
- Chapel of the Convent of the Assumption, Kensington Square, London, 1875
- St Mungo's Church, Townhead, Glasgow, 1841 and 1877
- St Mary and St Joseph's Church, Bedale, 1878
- Sacred Heart Church, Liverpool, 1886
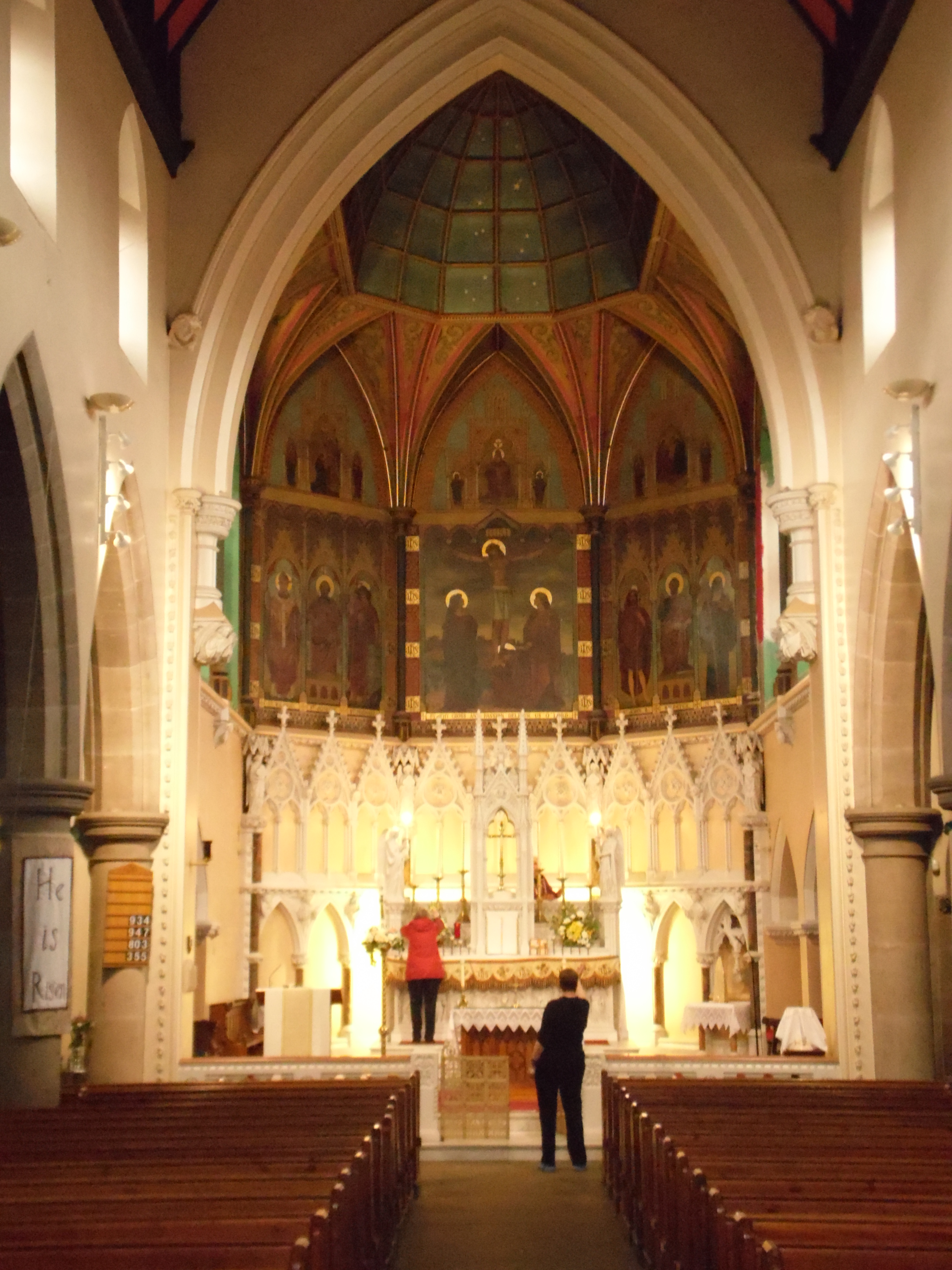
St Peter Catholic church Scarborough interior

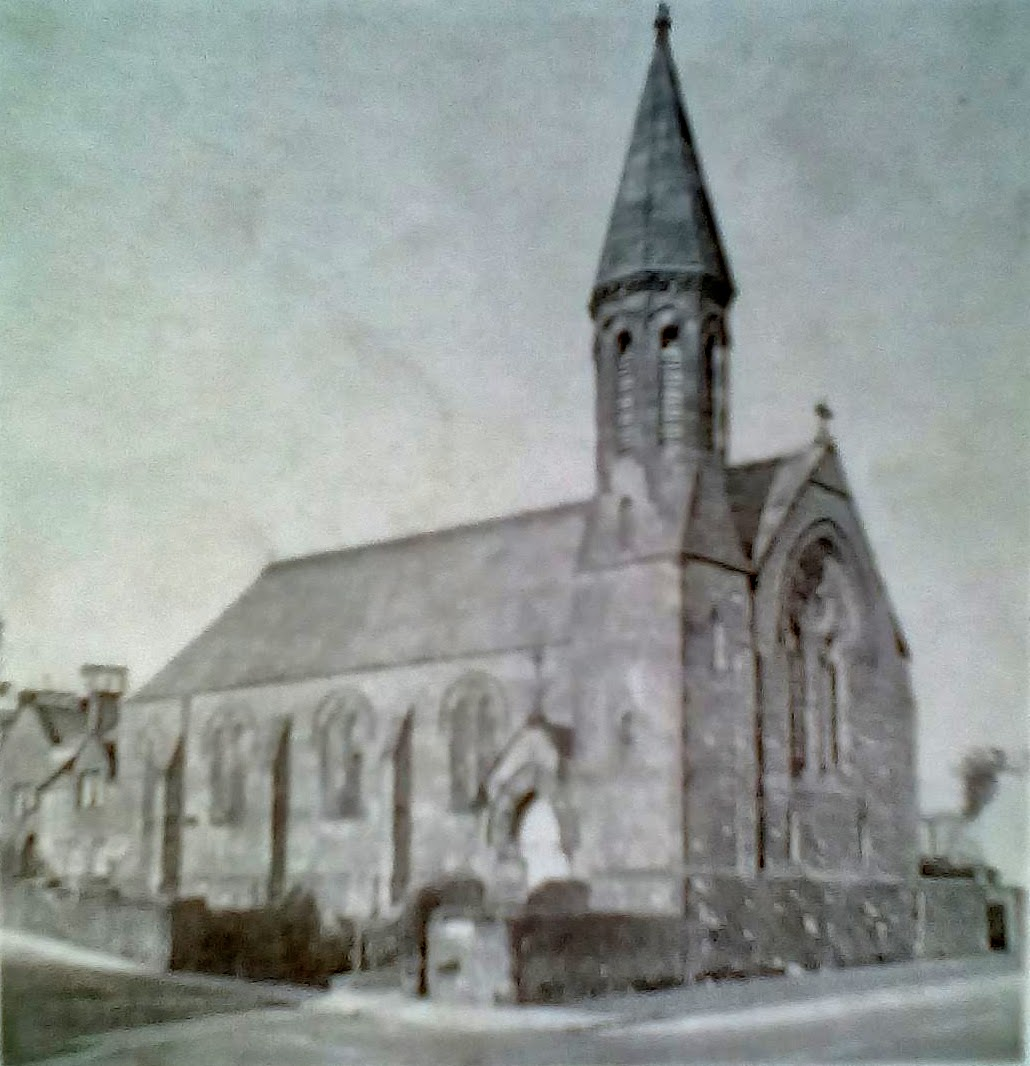
St John the Evangelist Catholic Church, Castle Douglas

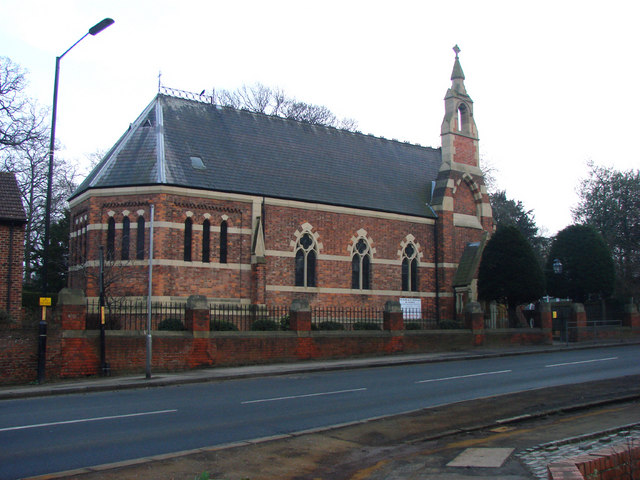
St Mary St Romuald Roman Catholic Church, Yarm

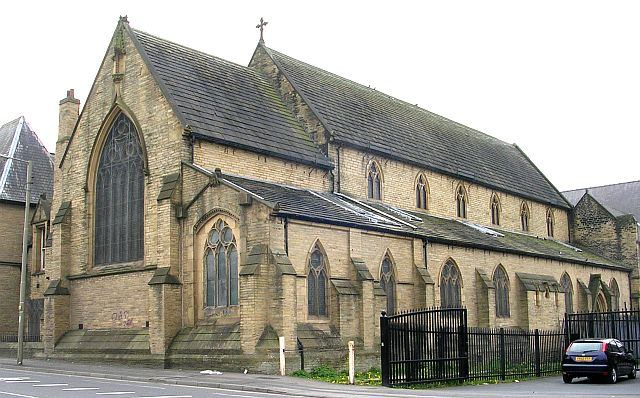
St Patrick's Catholic Church, Bradford

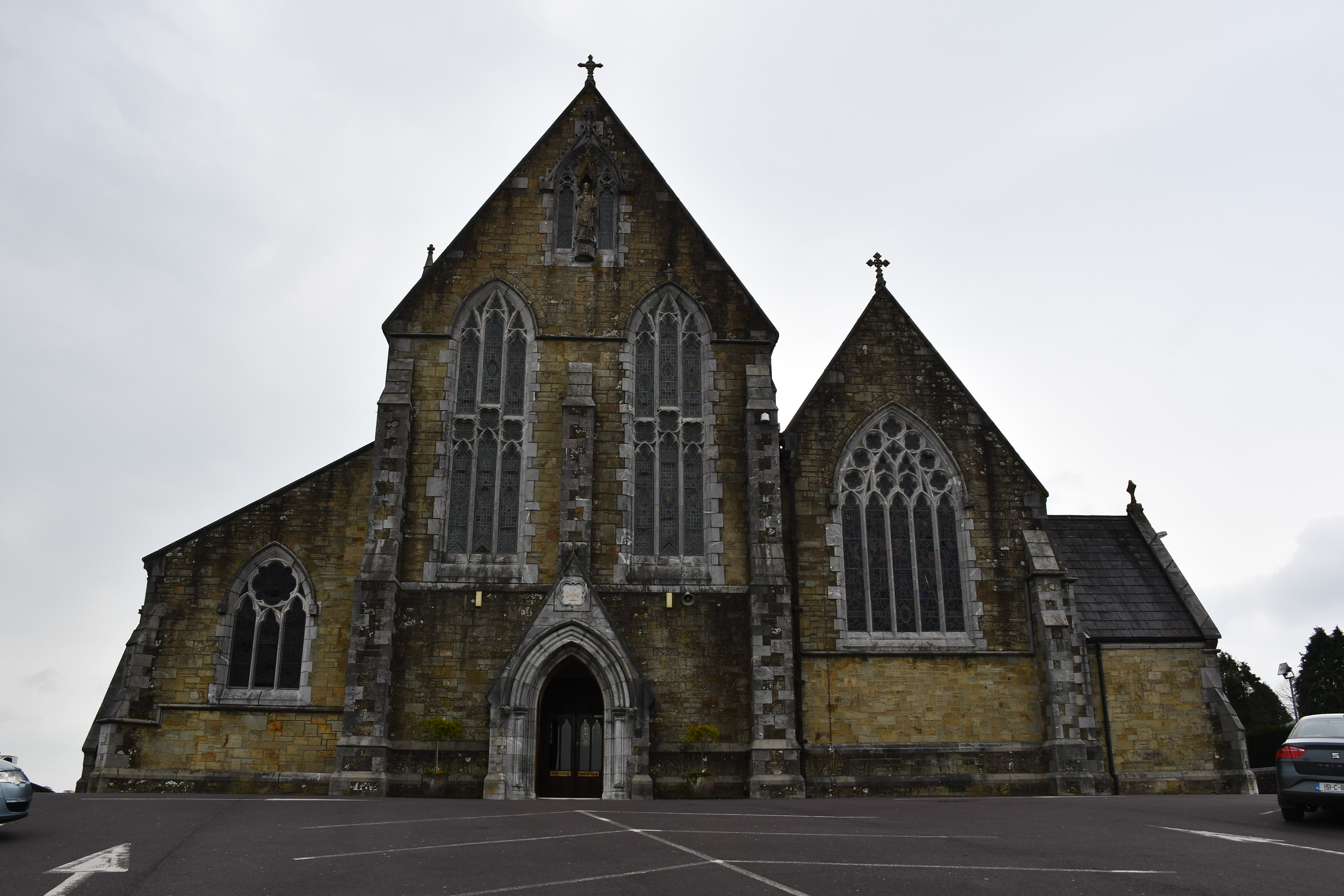
St. Patrick's Roman Catholic Church, Bandon, Co. Cork, Ireland

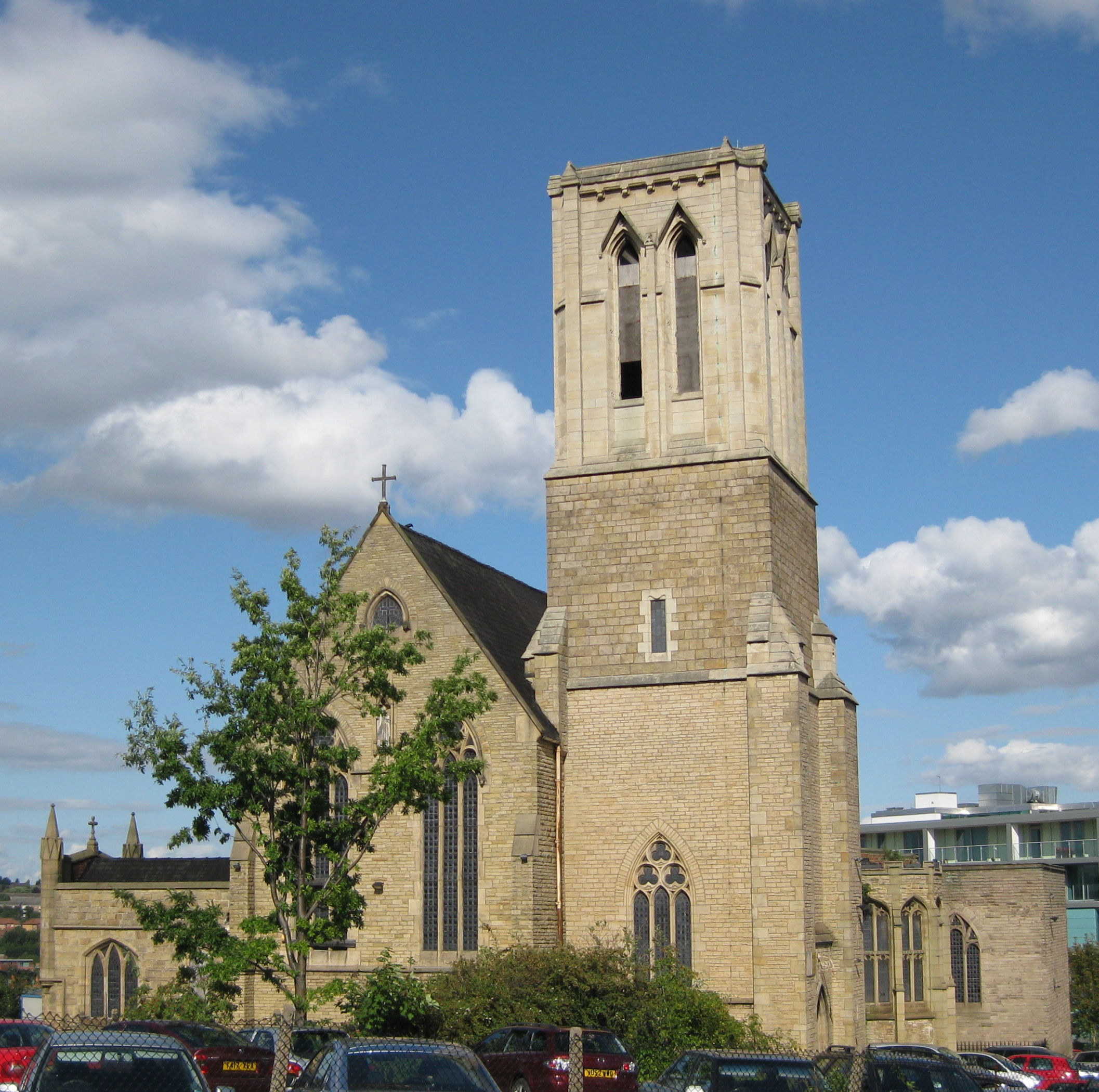
StVincent's, Sheffield

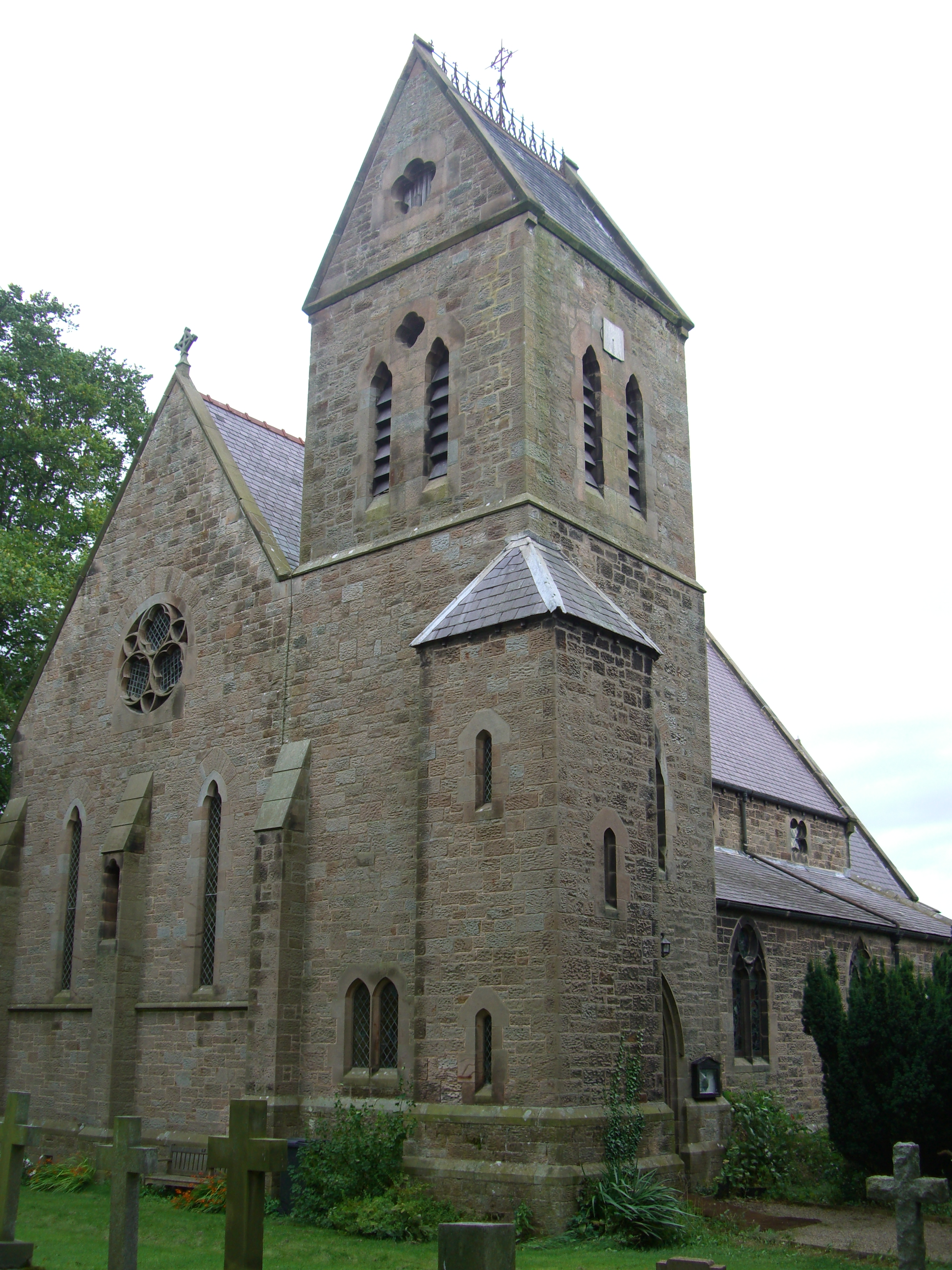
St. Ninian's Wooler
